= Egyptian Revival architecture in the British Isles =

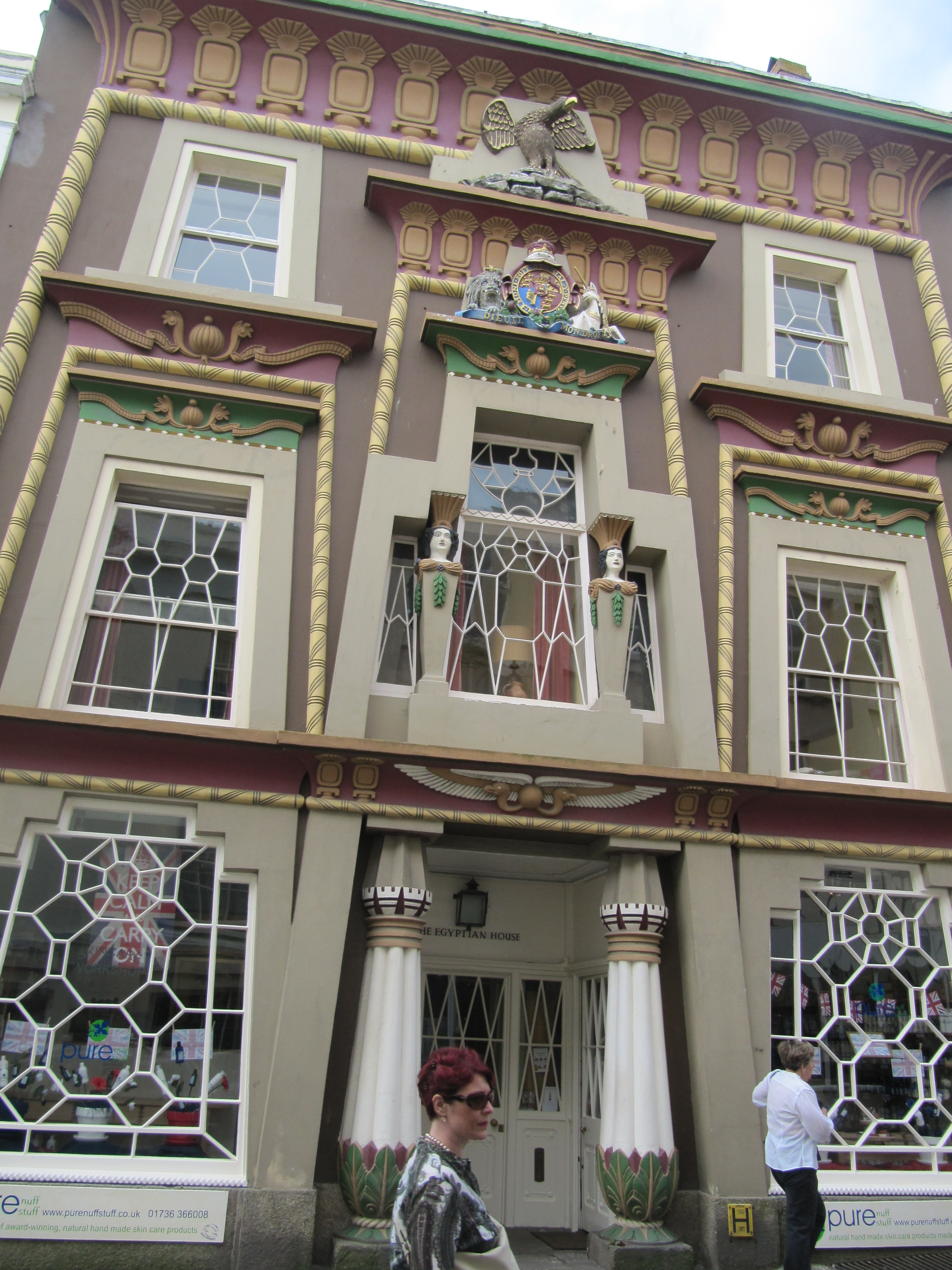
Egyptian House, Penzance

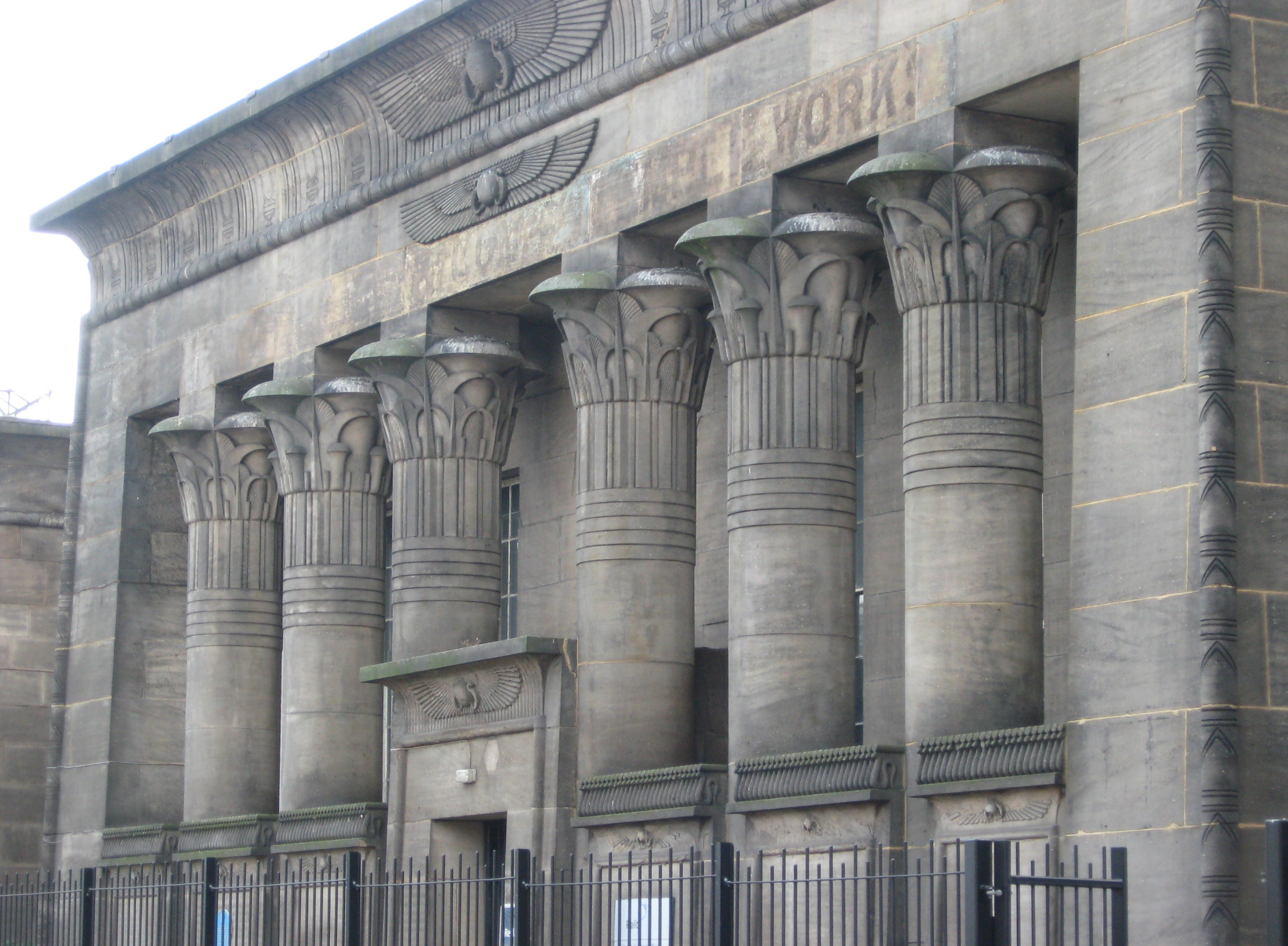
Temple Works, Holbeck, Leeds

Egyptian Revival architecture in the British Isles is a survey of motifs derived from Ancient Egyptian sources occurring as an architectural style. Egyptian Revival architecture is comparatively rare in the British Isles. Obelisks start appearing in the 17th century, mainly as decorative features on buildings, and by the 18th century, they started to be used in some numbers as funerary or commemorative monuments. In the later 18th century, mausoleums started to be built based on pyramids, and sphinxes were used as decorative features associated with monuments or mounted on gate piers. The pylon, a doorway feature with spreading jambs which support a lintel, also started to be used and became popular with architects.

As a result of the Napoleonic conquest of Egypt in 1798, more accurate records became available to architects, and Egyptian Revival became a recognised architectural style. As the 19th century progressed Egyptian features were, on occasions, used for industrial buildings and particularly for suspension bridges, and after 1830 the Egyptian Revival style was often used for cemetery buildings and monuments in cemeteries. Some examples of churches and synagogues exist in this style.

By the end of the 19th century, the style had very nearly disappeared, but in 1922, with Howard Carter's discovery of Tutankhamun's tomb the style underwent a dramatic revival. It was used particularly for cinema architecture and sometimes for factory buildings. The angular shapes of Egyptian architecture could be mixed with those of Art Deco, leading to a hybrid Art Deco style which appeared in the 1930s. Subsequently, there have been very few buildings in the Egyptian Revival style.

== Sources for the style ==
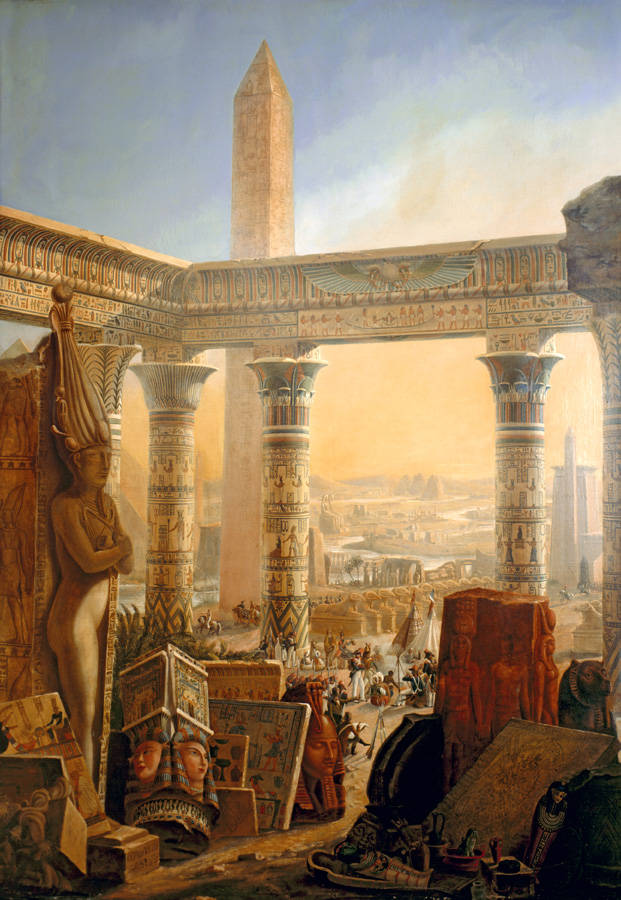
Frontispiece to Description de l'Égypte

The first illustration of a pyramid was published by John Greaves, Professor of Mathematics at Oxford University, in 1646, to record and draw on site, the external and internal measurements of the Giza pyramids and to confirm that they were tombs. Detailed renderings of various temples on the Nile, the Pyramids, and the Sphinx had been accumulating for connoisseurs and designers in works such as Bernard de Montfaucon's, ten-volume L'Antiquité expliquée et representée en figures (1719–1724), which reproduces, methodically grouped, all the ancient monuments. In 1735 Benoît de Maillet's Description de l'Égypte (1735) appeared and was followed by Comte de Caylus Recueil d'antiquités égyptiennes, étrusques, grècques, romaines et gauloises of 1752–55. This was followed by Frederic Louis Norden's Voyage d'Egypte et de Nubie (1755). Norden had travelled widely in Egypt and provided much detailed information about the standing monuments.

Also of importance were the engravings of Giambattista Piranesi (1720–1778), which included, in his defence of Roman forms, a place for Egypt as a primary source. In his engravings and especially in his Diversi maniere d'adornare i cam mini of 1769. Piranesi promoted Egyptian ornament, and advanced the theme of the Sublime, esteeming the monumentality of Egypt's austere and stereometric architectural forms to be the major influence on the emerging Neoclassicism and its Egyptian Revival. Travellers from Britain, such as Richard Pococke, who published in 1743 A Description of the East and Some Other Countries were also a source for popularising Egyptian architecture.

The invasion of Egypt by Napoleon Bonaparte in 1798 was to provide a major stimulus to the study of Egypt's past and encouragement of Egyptian Revival architecture. It was the informed and accurate literature which then appeared, which for the first time produced detailed surveys of the country's major buildings. The first publication was Vivant Denon's (1747–1825) partly inspired by the success of the Egyptian Room in Thomas Hope's house in Duchess Street, which was open to the public and had been well illustrated in Hope's Household Furniture and Interior Decoration (London, 1807).

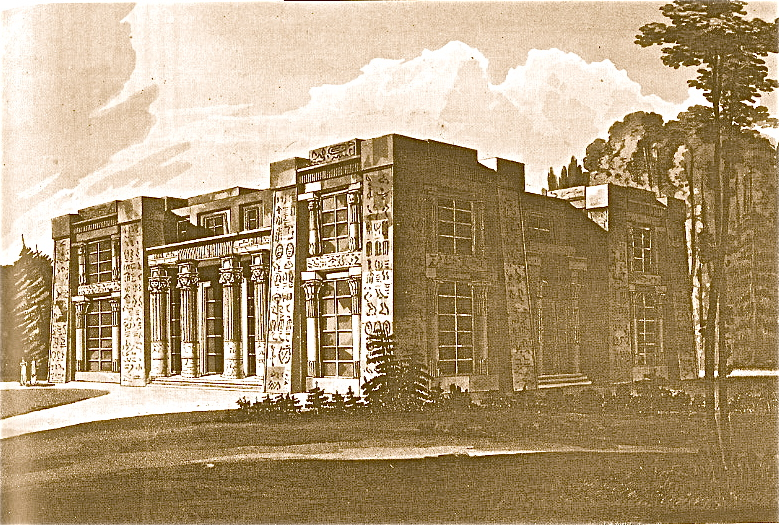
Egyptian Mansion designed by John Randall, 1806

At this point architects started producing examples of Egyptian buildings that they hoped their clients would wish to have built. An example of this is a Perspective view of a Mansion in the Egyptian style by James Marshall in 1806. Designs for shopfronts were also being produced and probably executed at this time by architects in London.

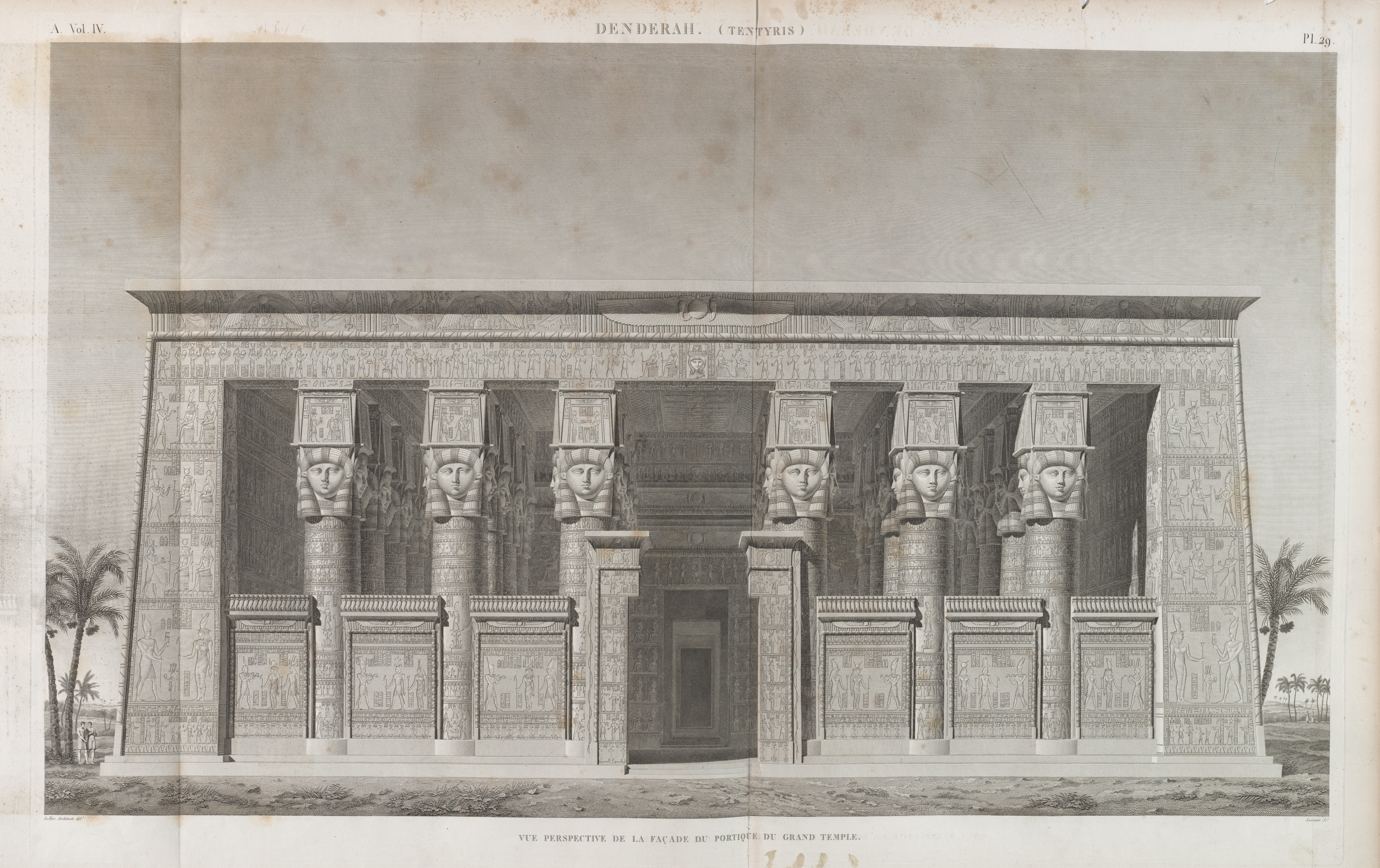
Portico of the Grande Temple at Dendera from the Description de l'Égypte

The full publication of Napoleon's scientific expedition was published as the Description de l'Égypte in 23 or 29 volumes between 1809 and 1828. This was to provide a major resource for the architects and their clients if they were considering introducing Egyptian elements in their buildings. In particular the illustrations of the facade of the Grande Temple at Dendera were a popular source.

The Egyptian Hall in Piccadilly, London, commissioned by William Bullock as a museum to house his collection of curiosities was completed in 1812. The plans for the hall were drawn up by architect Peter Frederick Robinson. The museum was variously referred to as the London Museum, the Egyptian Hall or Museum, or Bullock's Museum. Later the Hall was used to display the discoveries made by Giovanni Battista Belzoni who had returned to England In 1819 and published an account of his travels and discoveries entitled a Narrative of the Operations and Recent Discoveries within the Pyramids, Temples, Tombs and Excavations in Egypt and Nubia, &c the following year. During 1820 and 1821 Belzoni also exhibited facsimiles of the tomb of Seti I. The exhibition was held at the Egyptian Hall, Piccadilly, London. This was a further stimulus to public interest in Egyptian art and architecture and coincided with the use by civil engineers in using pylons for suspension bridges, chain piers and the furnaces at Lord Bute's Ironworks at Rhymney in south Wales.

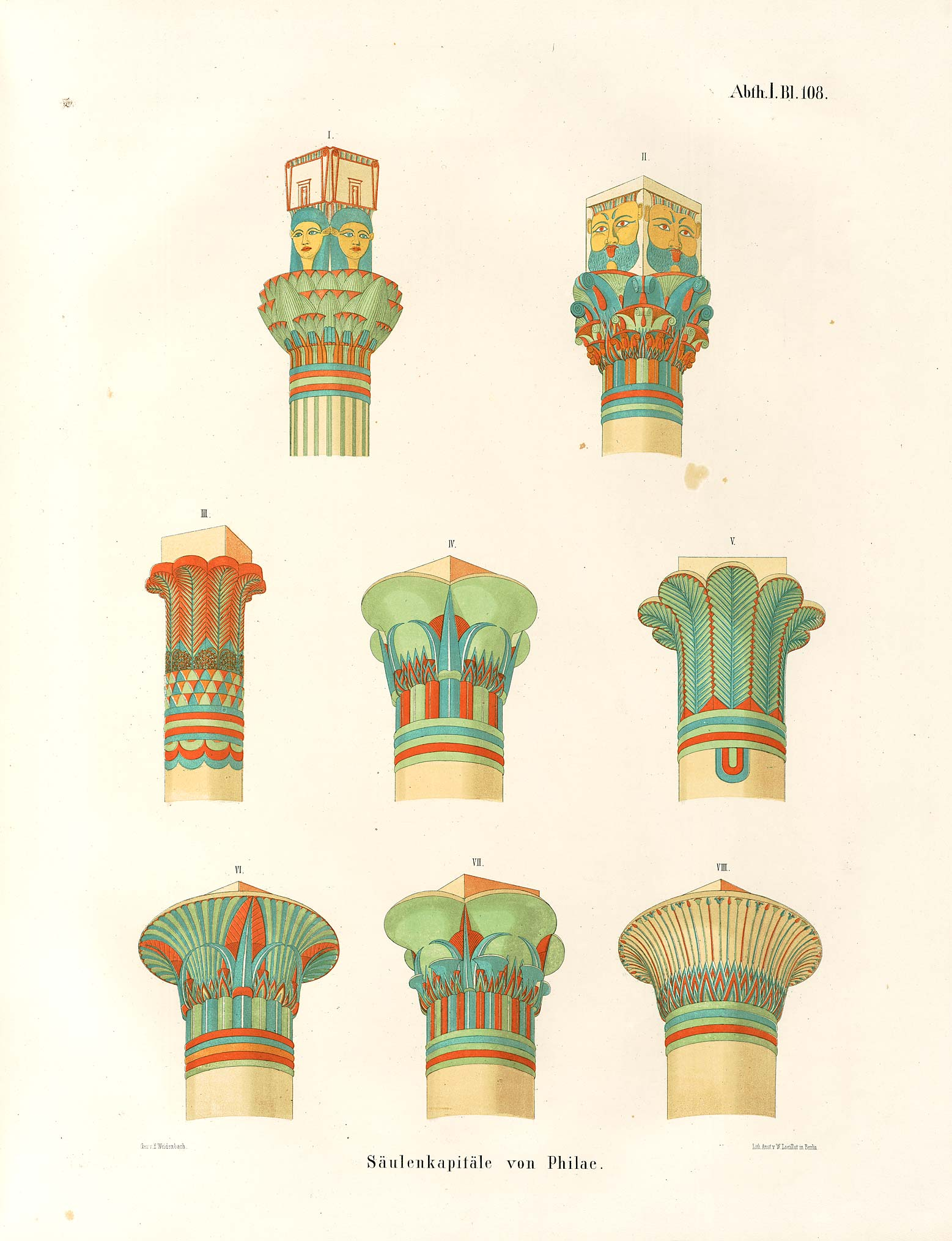
Drawings of all types of architectural capitals from the Ancient Egyptian civilisation from the Lepsuis expedition 1842–1845

The English architect and egyptologist Joseph Bonomi the Younger joined an expedition to Egypt led by the Scotsman Robert Hay (Egyptologist). Hay and Bonomi stayed in Egypt from November 1824 until 1828, and 1829 to 1834, recording monuments and inscriptions, and making a large number of architectural plans. Their manuscripts are now primarily in the British Library, and many of his plaster casts in the British Museum. In Cairo (1827–1828), In 1828 Bonomi worked in Cairo on the illustrations for James Burton's Excerpta hieroglyphica – Burton was the elder brother of the architect Decimus Burton. This was followed by the artist David Roberts. He is especially known for a prolific series of detailed lithograph prints of Egypt and the Near East that he produced from sketches he made during long tours of the region between 1838 and 1840.

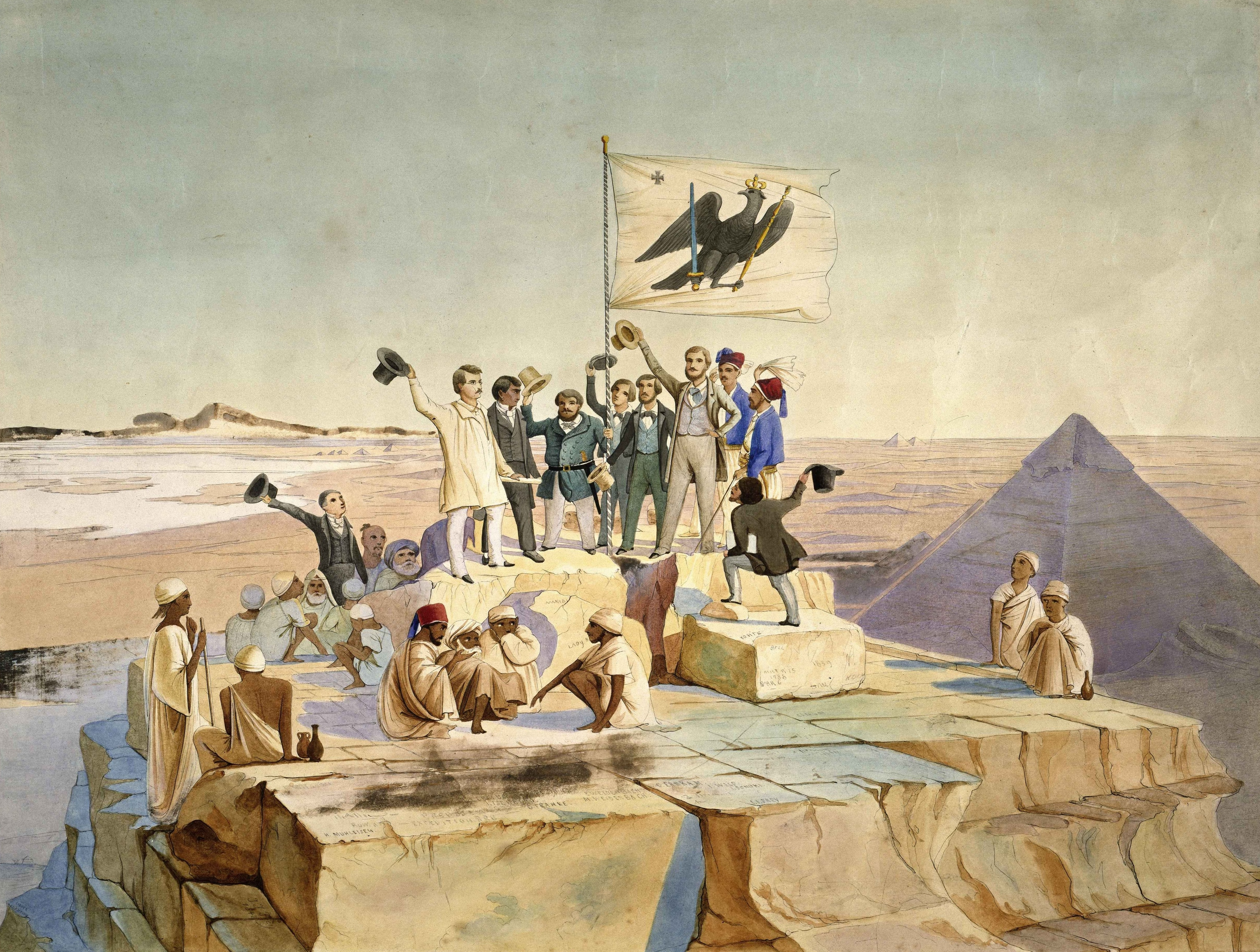
Lepsius Expedition at the Cheops Pyramid, showing Joseph Bonomi and James William Wild

Belzoni travels in Egypt were followed by Bononi David Hay Expedition.

Finally the Prussian expedition under Karl Richard Lepsius should be mentioned. This was modelled after the earlier Napoléonic mission, and consisted of surveyors, draftsmen, and other specialists. The mission reached Giza in November 1842 and spent six months making some of the first scientific studies of the pyramids of Giza, Abusir, Saqqara, and Dahshur. They discovered 67 pyramids, recorded in the pioneering Lepsius list of pyramids, and more than 130 tombs. The chief result of this expedition was the publication of Denkmäler aus Ägypten und Äthiopien (Monuments from Egypt and Ethiopia), a massive twelve-volume compendia of nearly 900 plates of ancient Egyptian inscriptions, as well as accompanying commentary and descriptions published in 1849. This expedition was accompanied by Joseph Bonomi and another English architect James William Wild.

== Forms and motifs ==
Cleopatra's Needle was re-erected in London in 1878, see Cleopatra's Needle, London.

=== Obelisks ===
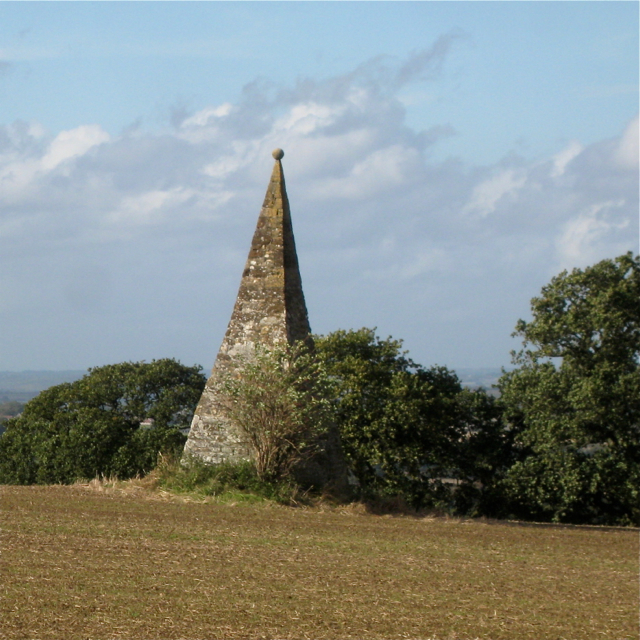
Compton Pike, sixteenth-century pyramidal stone beacon

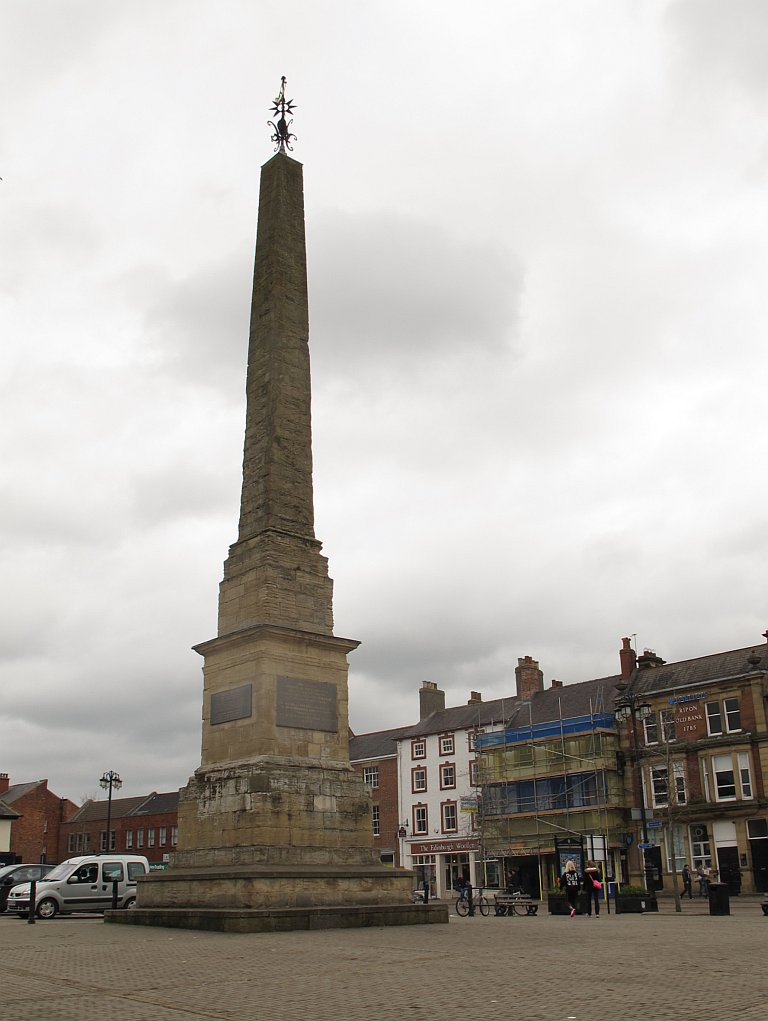
Ripon Obelisk, Ripon market place.

The first obelisks may start to appear in the later 16th century and it is suggested that the obelisk on Compton Pike is Elizabethan in date. More securely dated is a series of obelisks which start to appear in the 18th century. The first of these was the Wakeman obelisk of 1702 by Nicholas Hawksmoor, which is set in the square at Richmond, Yorkshire. Probably several hundred obelisks exist in the British Isles dating from 18th and early 19th centuries. Most of these obelisks, which are often landmarks commemorate famous people and their achievements. At Stowe in Buckinghamshire an obelisk was erected in memory of Wolfe's victory at Quebec in 1752, while at the death of the Duke of Cumberland in 1765 was noted by an obelisk at Englefield Green in Surrey. Thomas Coke, Earl of Leicester, Coke of Norfolk the farming pioneer has a particularly fine obelisk, set up in the park he created at Holkham in Norfolk. Sometimes an obelisk was used to mark the site of a battle such as the obelisk on the site of English Civil War battlefield at Naseby in Leicestershire. Occasionally obelisks are used as mile markers, as on the Great North Road at a mile from Westminster. In Lincoln an elaborate obelisk was set up on the High Bridge in 1762–63 as a conduit for dispensing water, while Anthony Salvin used obelisks as water fountains on the Belton House estates in Lincolnshire.

In Ireland an early obelisk was constructed as a family funeral memorial by Sir Edward Lovatt Pierce for the Allen family at Stillorgan in Ireland in 1717, called the Stillorgan Obelisk, one of several Egyptian obelisks erected in Ireland during the early 18th century. Others may be found at Belan, County Kildare; and Dangan, County Meath. The Casteltown Folly in County Kildare is probably the best known, albeit the least Egyptian-styled.

==== Jubilee Tower, Moel Famau, Flintshire ====
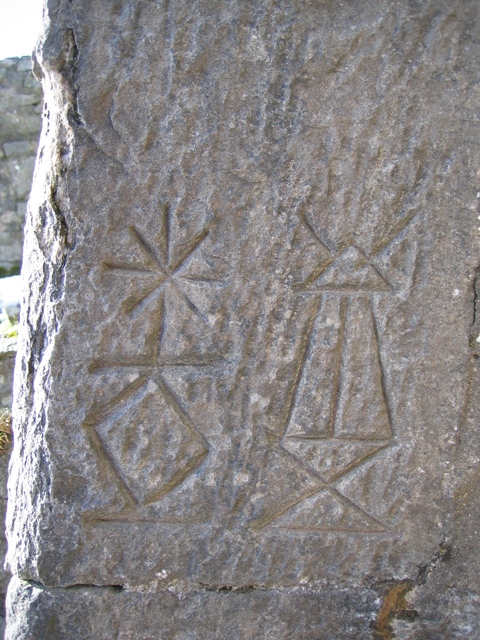
Moel Famau Jubilee Tower Hieroglyphs

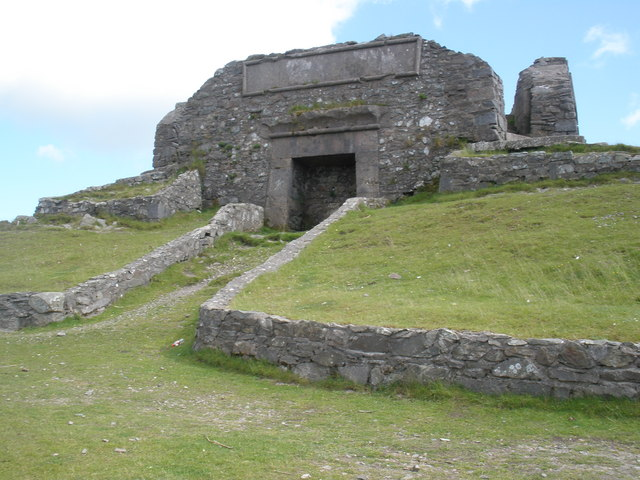
The remains of Jubilee Tower, on Moel Famau

A particularly ambitious example of an obelisk type monument was the tower, built to commemorate the Golden Jubilee of George III in 1810. It stands on the summit of Moel Famau in northeast Wales and was designed by Thomas Harrison of Chester. It takes its inspiration from an Egyptian obelisk with three tiers. Although the foundation stone was laid in 1810 by George Kenyon, 2nd Baron Kenyon, the tower was never completed due to a lack of funds. In 1862, a major storm brought down the incomplete tower. The remaining upper part of the structure was demolished for safety reasons leaving just the base. Egyptian features can still be discerned in the ruins of the monument with the Pylon doors and the Hieroglyphic characters on the stonework.

==== Obelisk Gallery ====
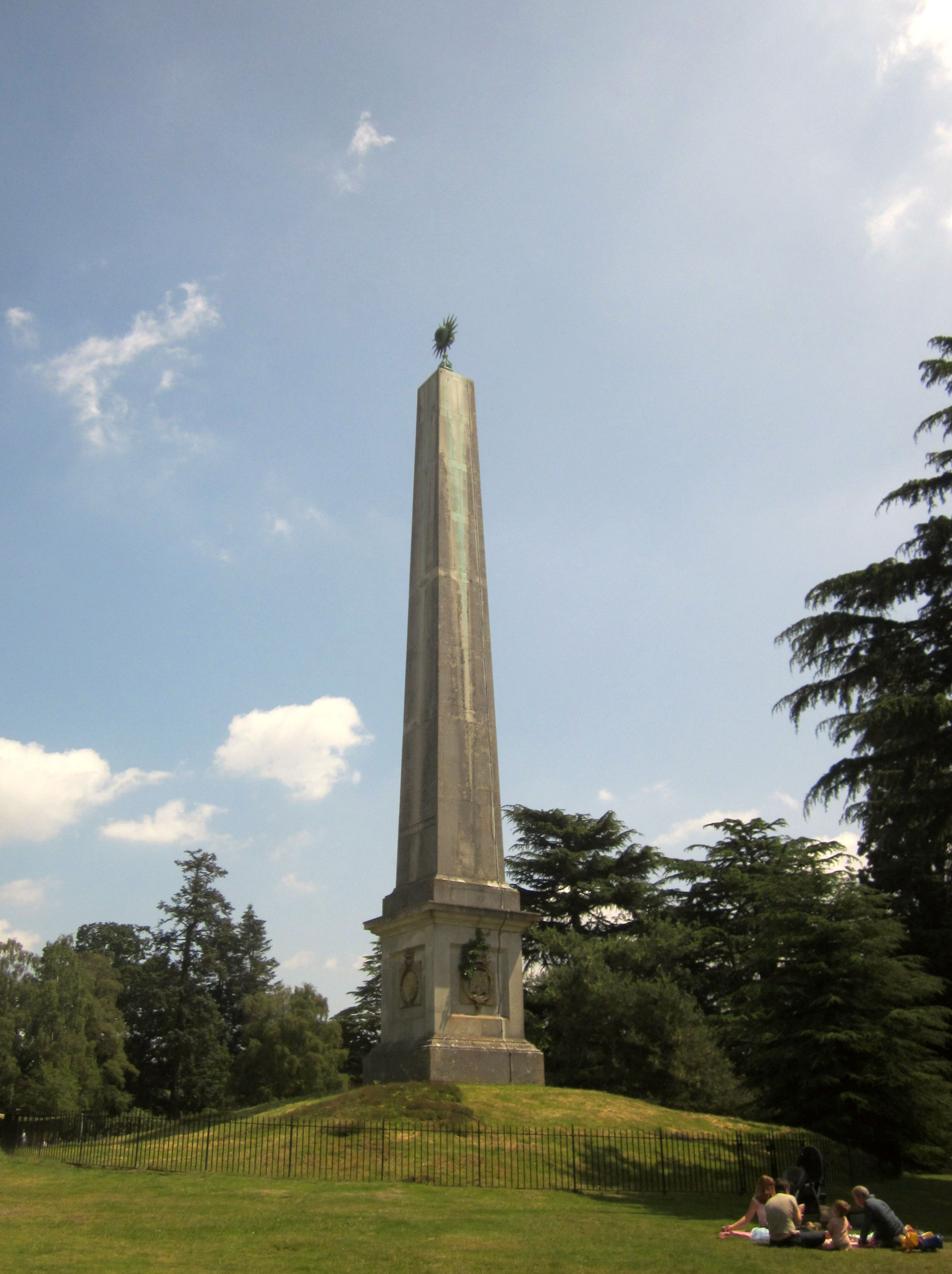
Duke Cumberland Obelisk 1765

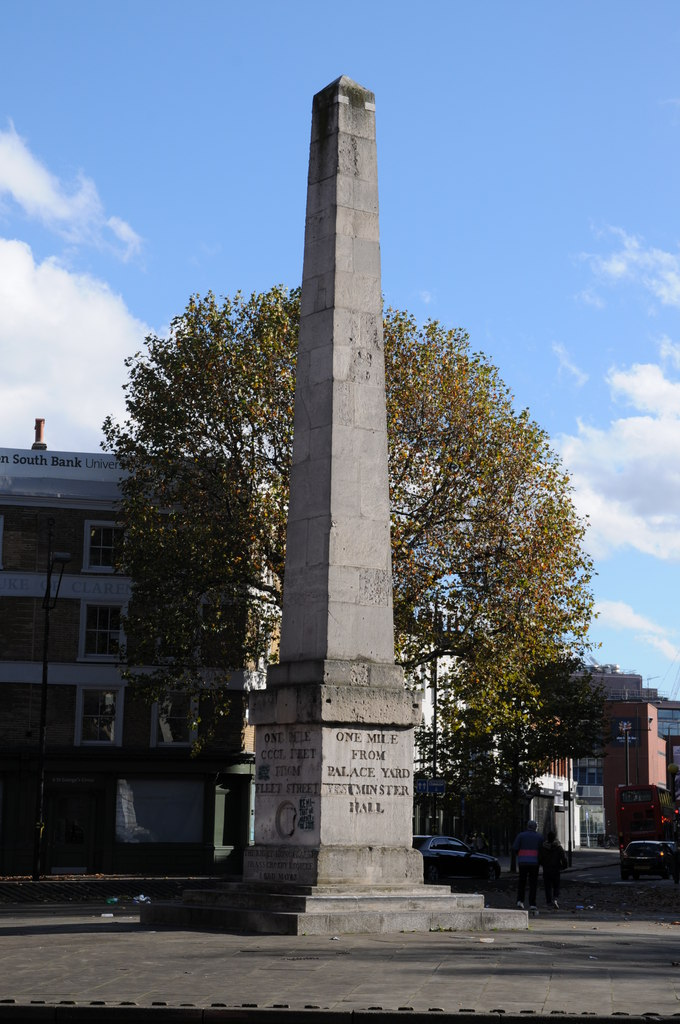
Obelisk on St Georges Circus

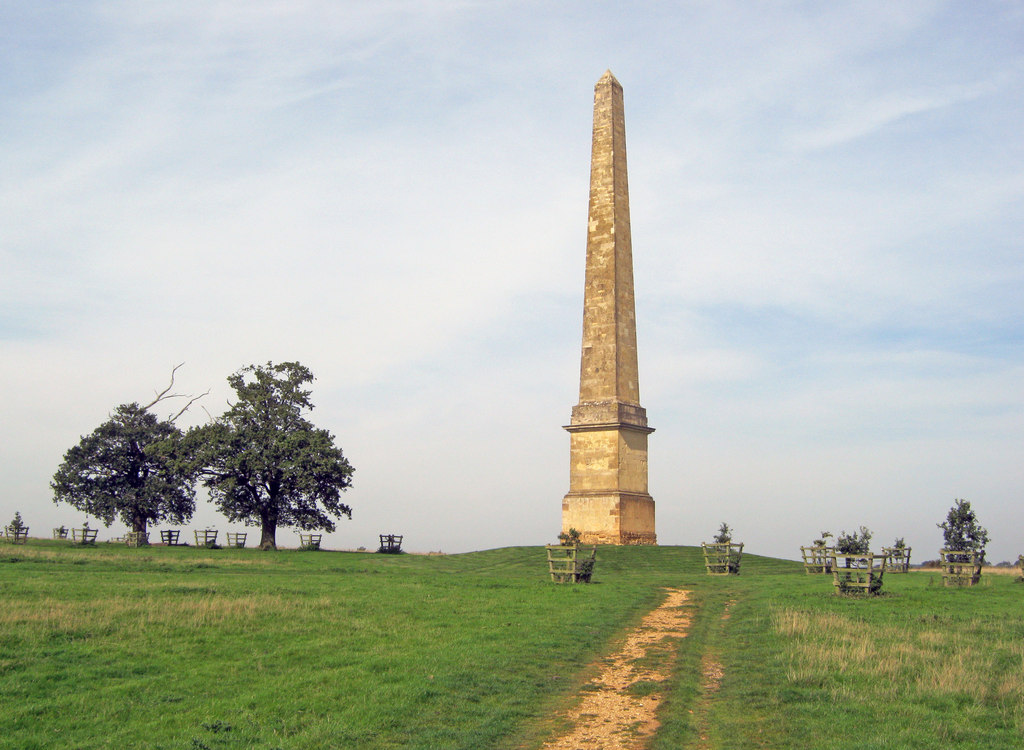
General Wolfe's Obelisk Stowe, Buckinghamshire post 1759

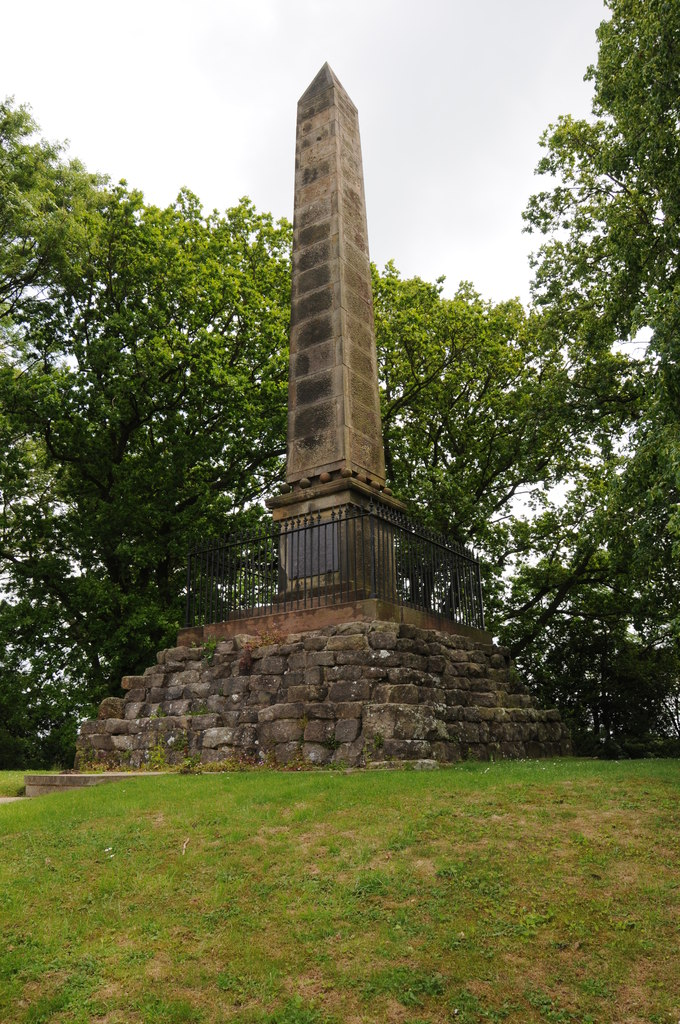
Naseby Obelisk

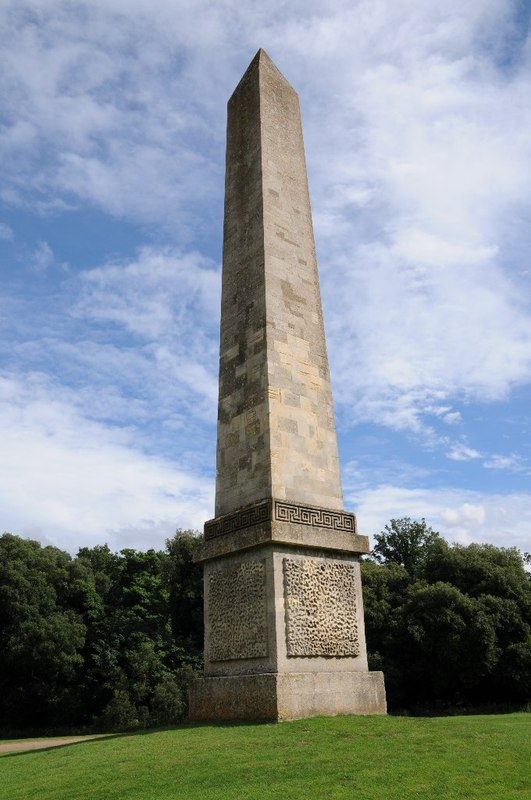
Obelisk in Holkham Park

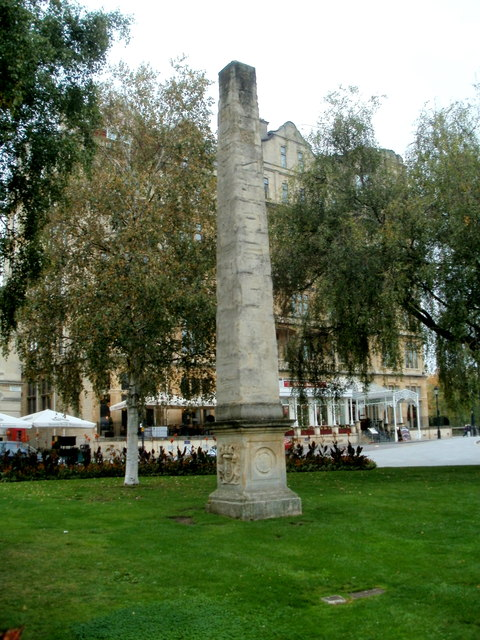
Prince of Orange obelisk, Bath 1734

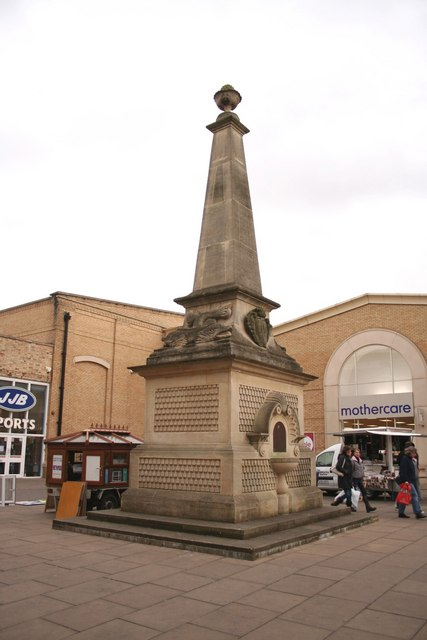
Lincoln High Bridge obelisk originally a water conduit

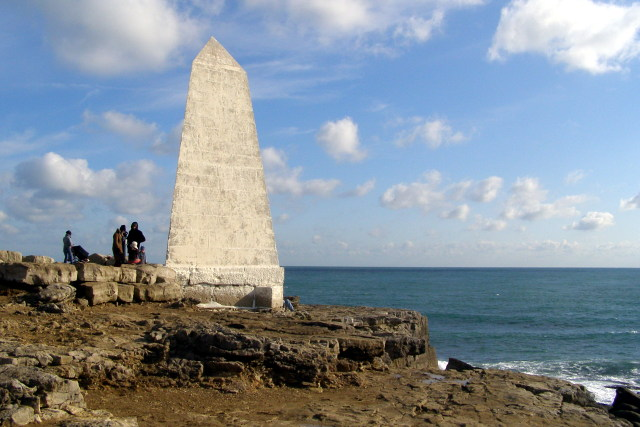
Trinity House obelisk, Portland Bill 1844

General Sir David Baird's obelisk, near Crieff, erected 1832

=== Pyramids ===
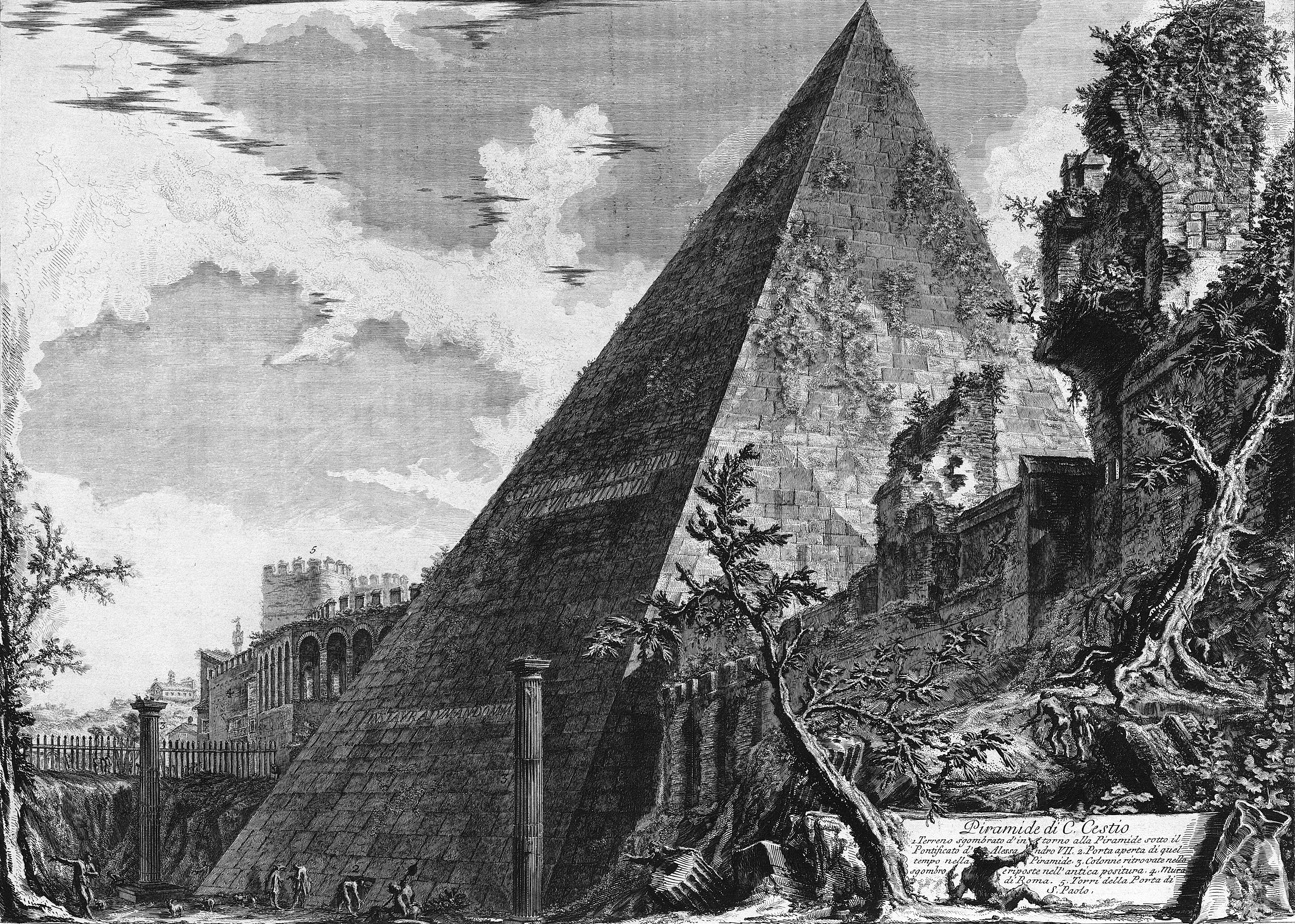
Piranesi. The Pyramid of Cestius in Rome

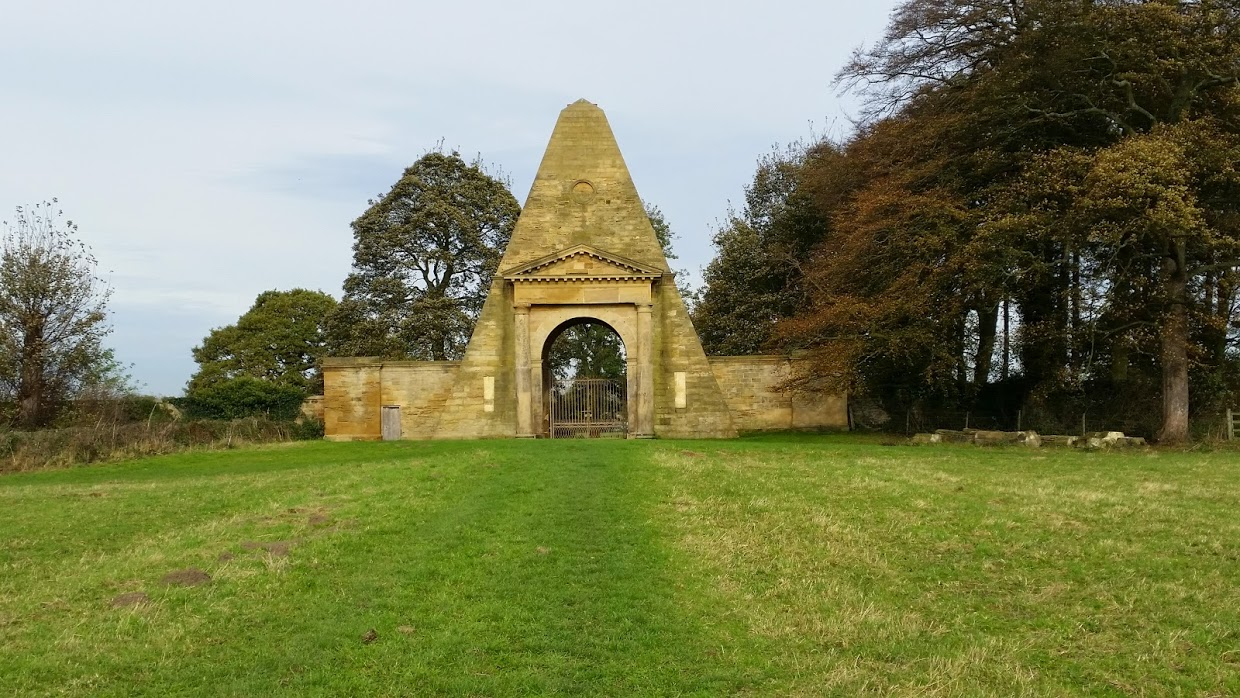
Pyramid Gatehouse, Nostell Priory

Stone pyramids were occasionally used as funerary Mausoleum from the late 17th century onwards. The inspiration is likely to have been a pyramid built in Rome, about 18–12 BC, as a tomb for Gaius Cestius, a magistrate and member of the Septemviri Epulonum. This was well known from the mid-18th century engraving of the pyramid by Piranesi's. The earliest example in the British Isles of a pyramid is the Clark Mausoleum at Peniciuk in Scotland of the late 17th century. In 1783 a pyramid was added to an otherwise classical mausoleum designed by James Wyatt for the Darnley family at Cobham Park in Kent. Then in 1794–96 a pyramid mausoleum by the Italian architect Joseph Bonomi for William Assheton Harbord in Blickling Park in Norfolk. Bonomi would have been familiar with the Pyramid of Cestius in Rome Other pyramidal mausoleums are Franics Douce's of 1760 at Nether Wallop and his cousin built the pyramid at Farley Mount in 1734 to commemorate a racehorse he owned, while another relative "Mad Jack" Fuller had a pyramidal mausoleum built at Brightling in Sussex in 1834.

Pyramids were sometime used for the gateways or gate lodges to stately homes, as at Nostell Priory in Yorkshire, and Robert Adam produced a design for a pyramid shaped temple to be placed in parkland.

==== Pyramid Gallery ====
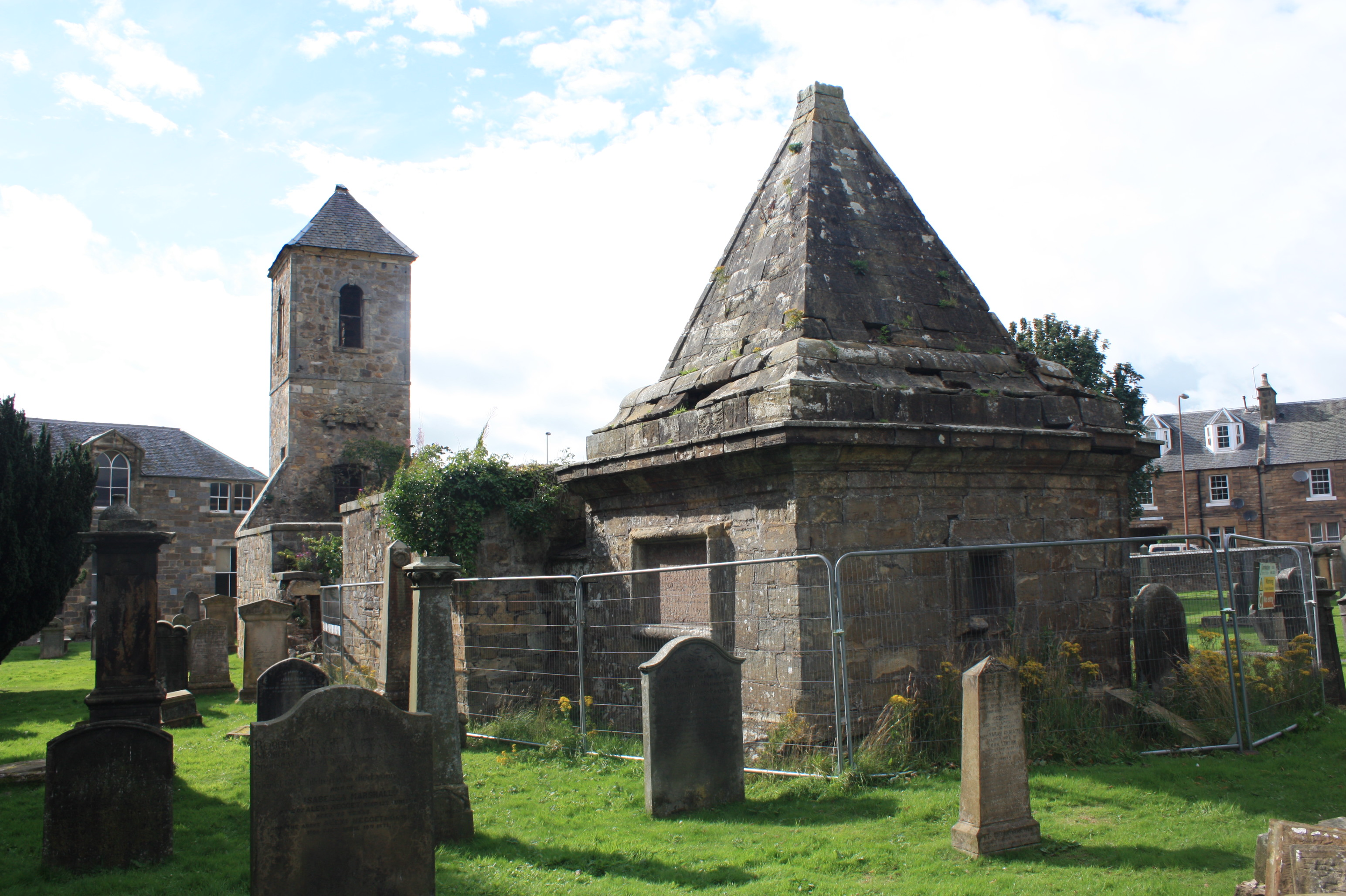
The Clerk mausoleum and old Kirk, Penicuik

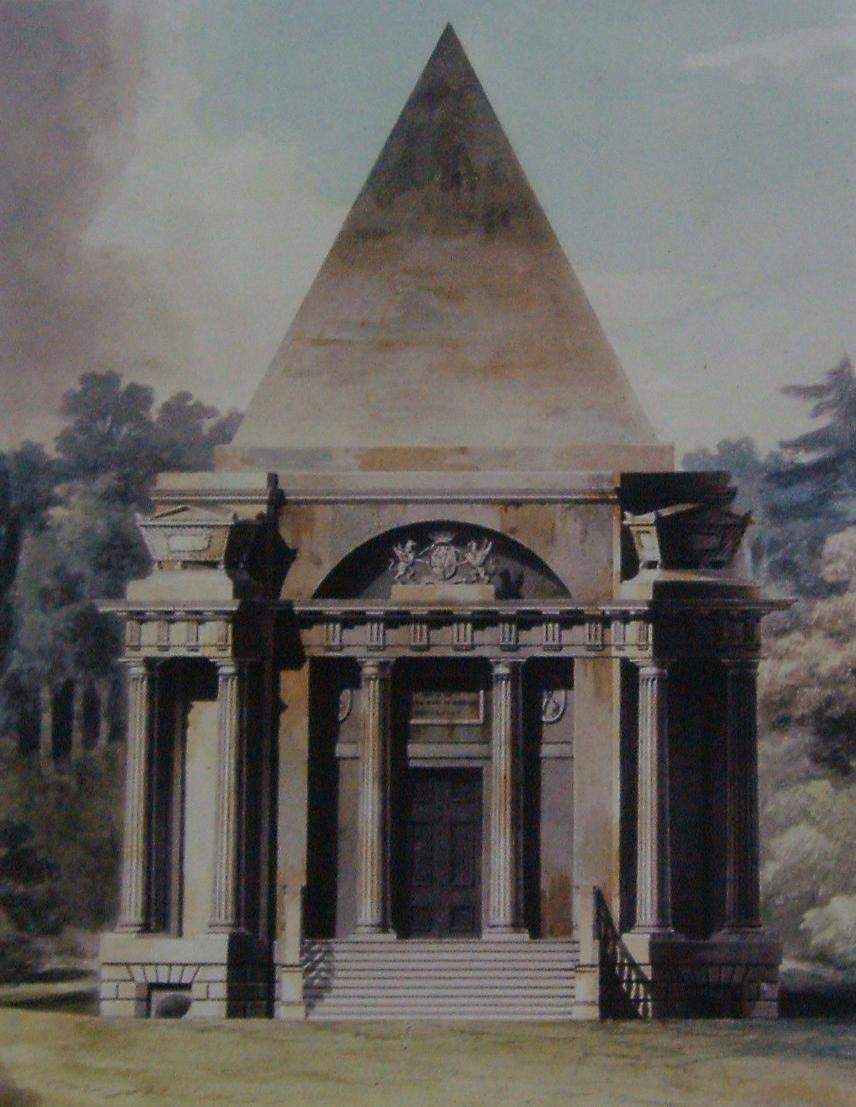
Darnley Mausoleum, Cobham Park 1783

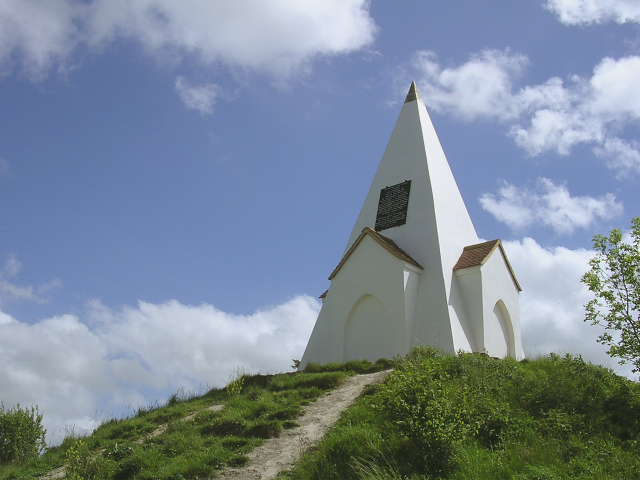
The monument to a racehorse, Farley Mount 1734

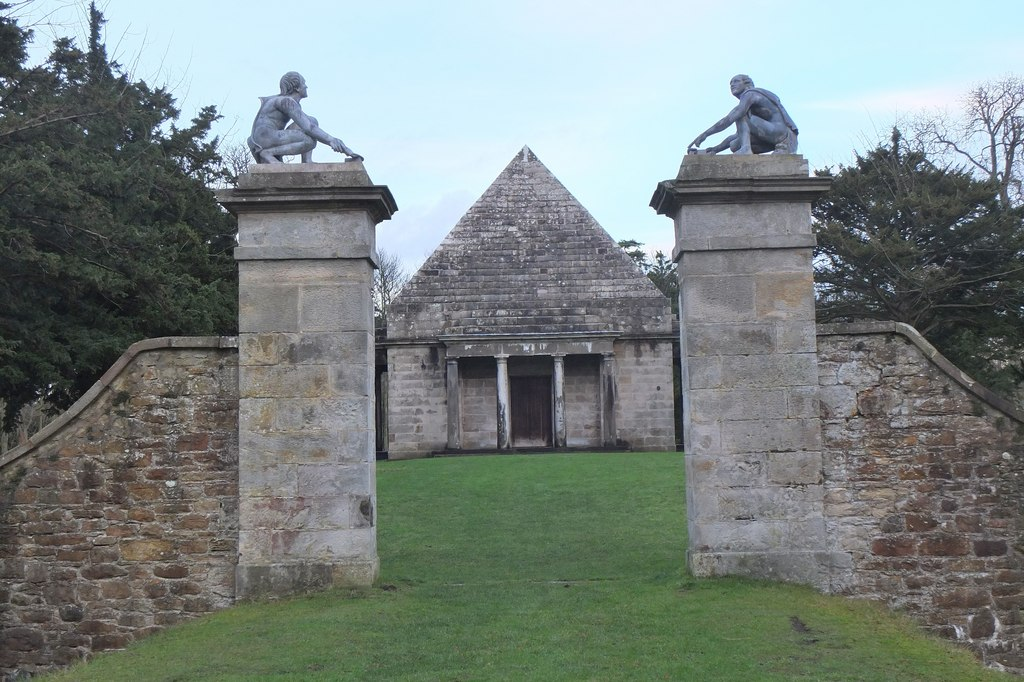
Mausoleum, Gosford Estate

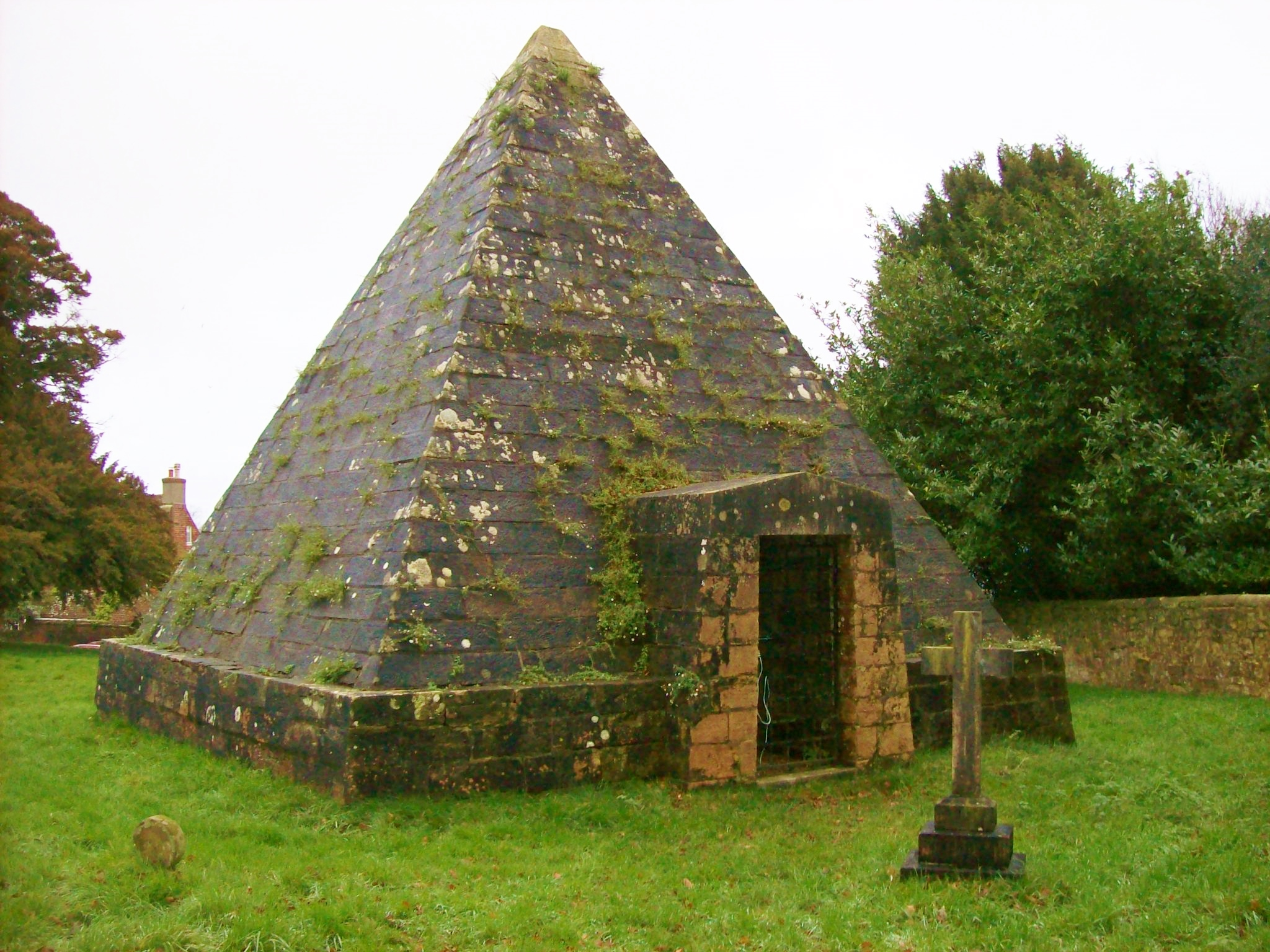
The pyramid, Brightling 1834

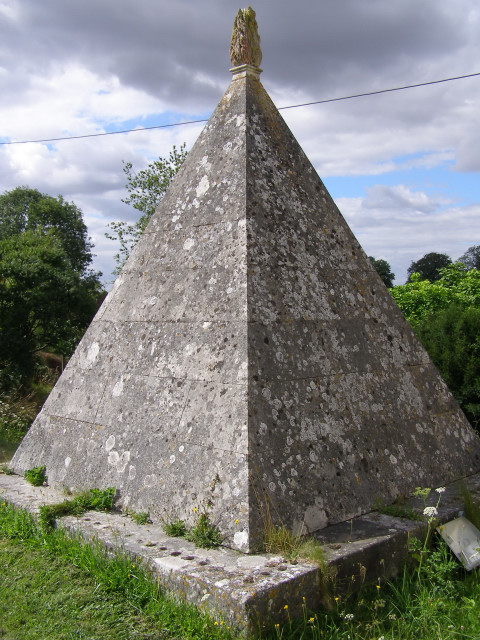
Francis Douce's mausoleum, Nether Wallop, Hampshire

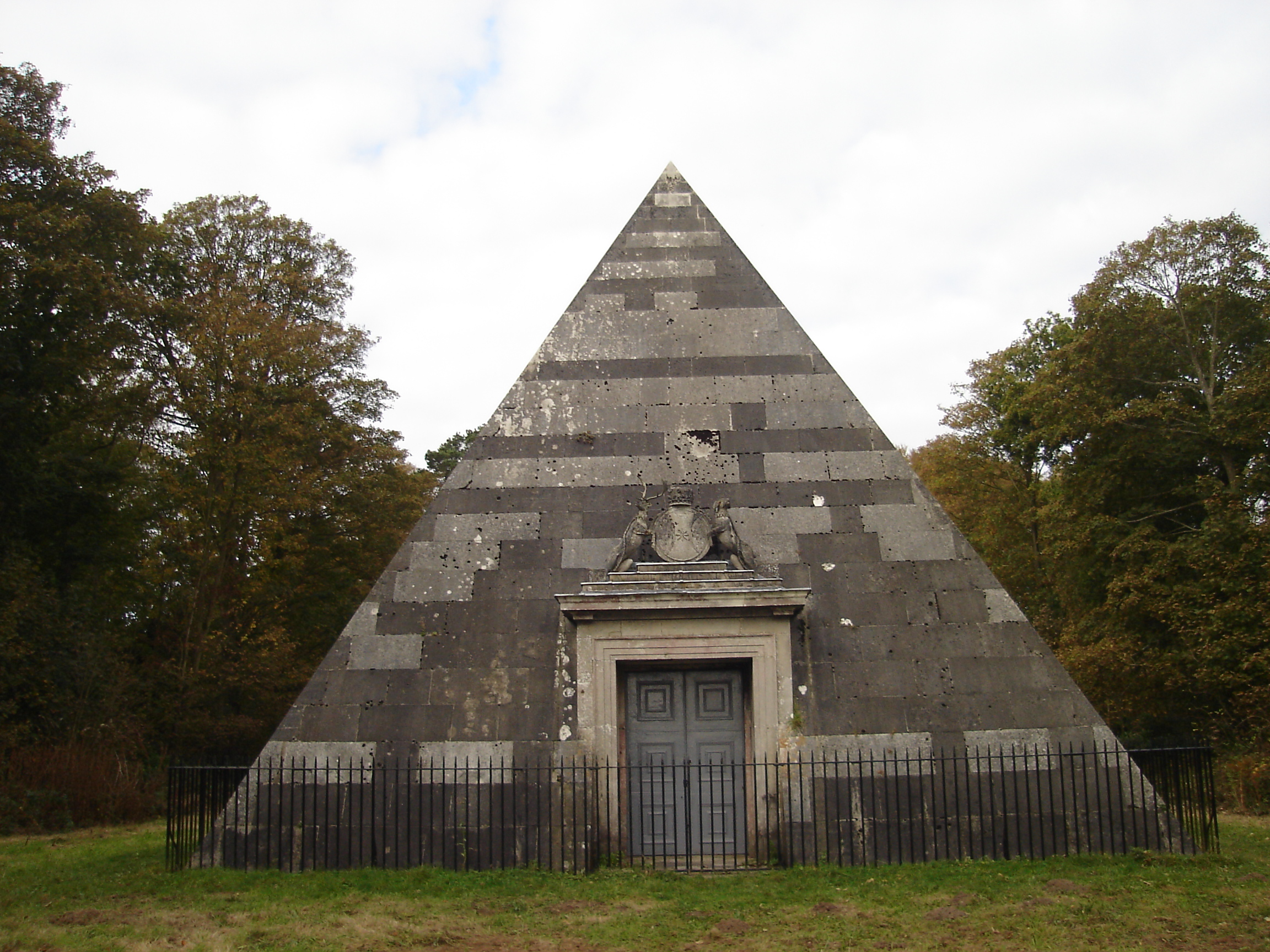
The Blickling Pyramid

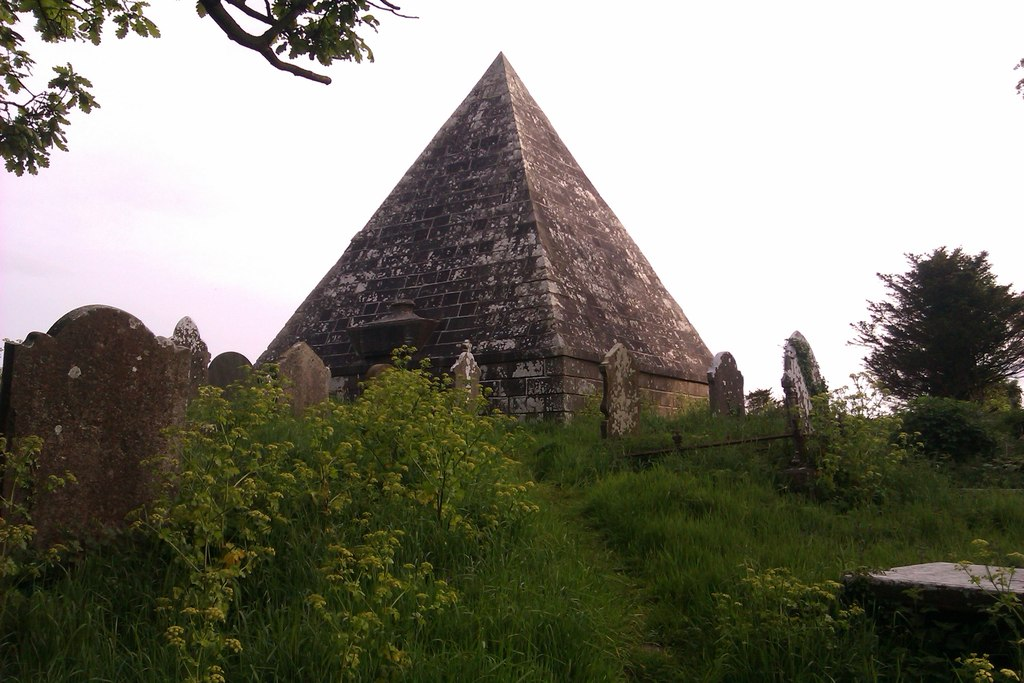
The Pyramid Tomb, Wicklow, Ireland

=== Sphinx ===
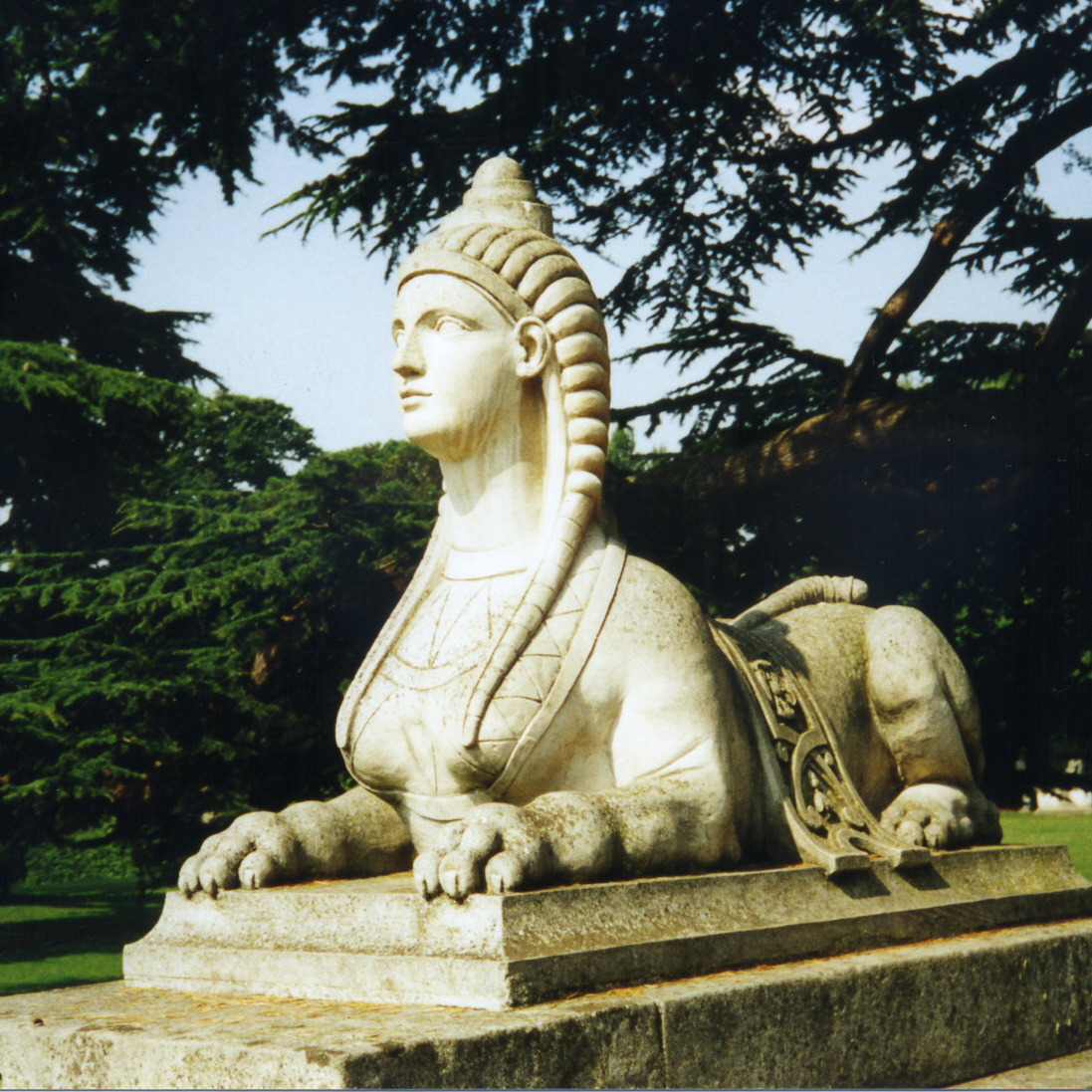
Chiswick House Sphinx on the lawn

Sphinx were used as decorative features, often on houses or surmounting gate piers from the 18th. century onwards. Possibly the earliest use of the Sphinx as a motif is as a support for a 17th. century sundial in the grounds of Newbattle Abbey in Midlothian, Scotland. In the 1730s Lord Burlington and William Kent introduced sphinx and other Egyptian elements into the gardens at Chiswick House. This was followed by James Playfair who used them as decorative features on Cairneess House, A pair of Sphinx were also used by James Bateman in his Egyptian Garden, which he created at Biddulph Grange in the 1840s.

==== Sphinx Gallery ====
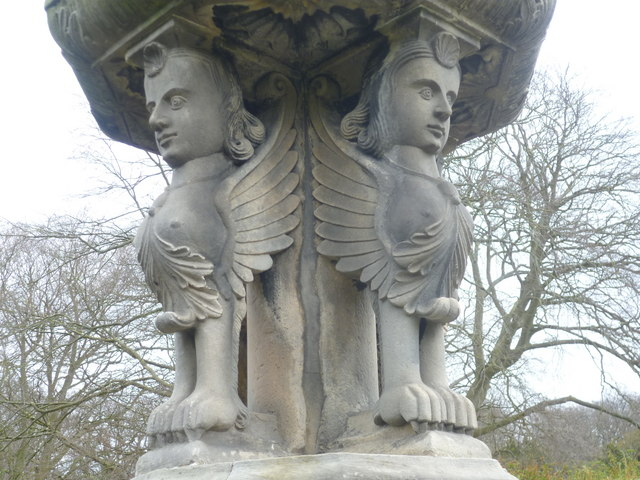
Sundial sphinxes, Newbattle Abbey, 17th century.

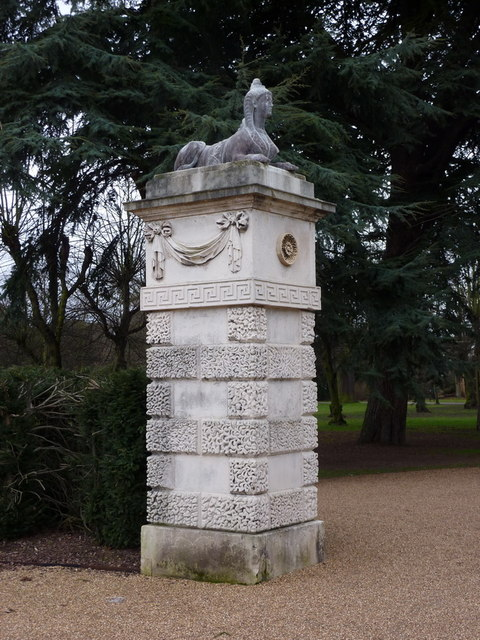
Chiswick House, Sphinx on gateway pillar

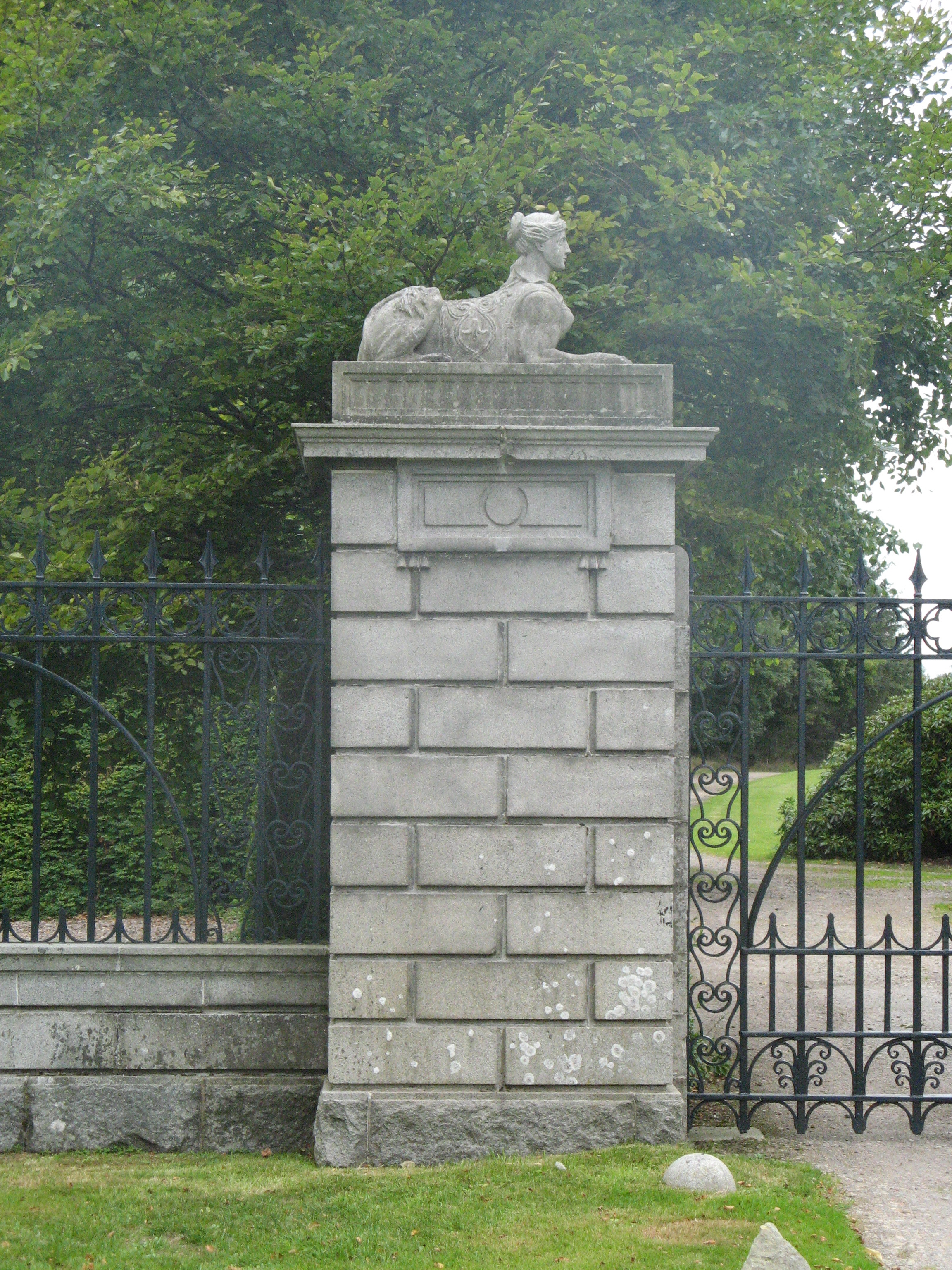
Cairness House, lodge gate pier

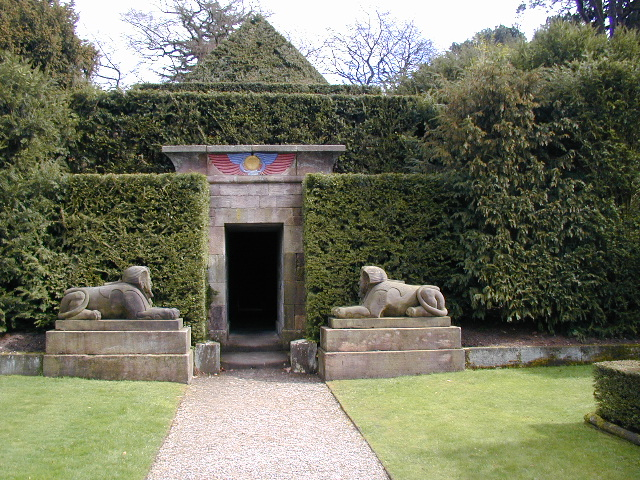
Sphinx in the Egyptian garden at Biddulph Grange c.1840

== Examples ==
=== Bullock's Museum or Egyptian Hall ===
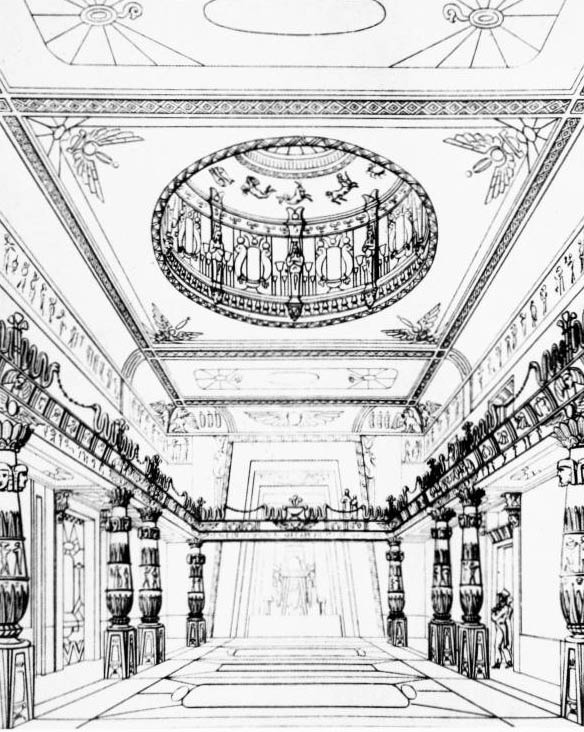
The Great Hall in the Egyptian Hall was redesigned by J. B. Papworth in 1819.

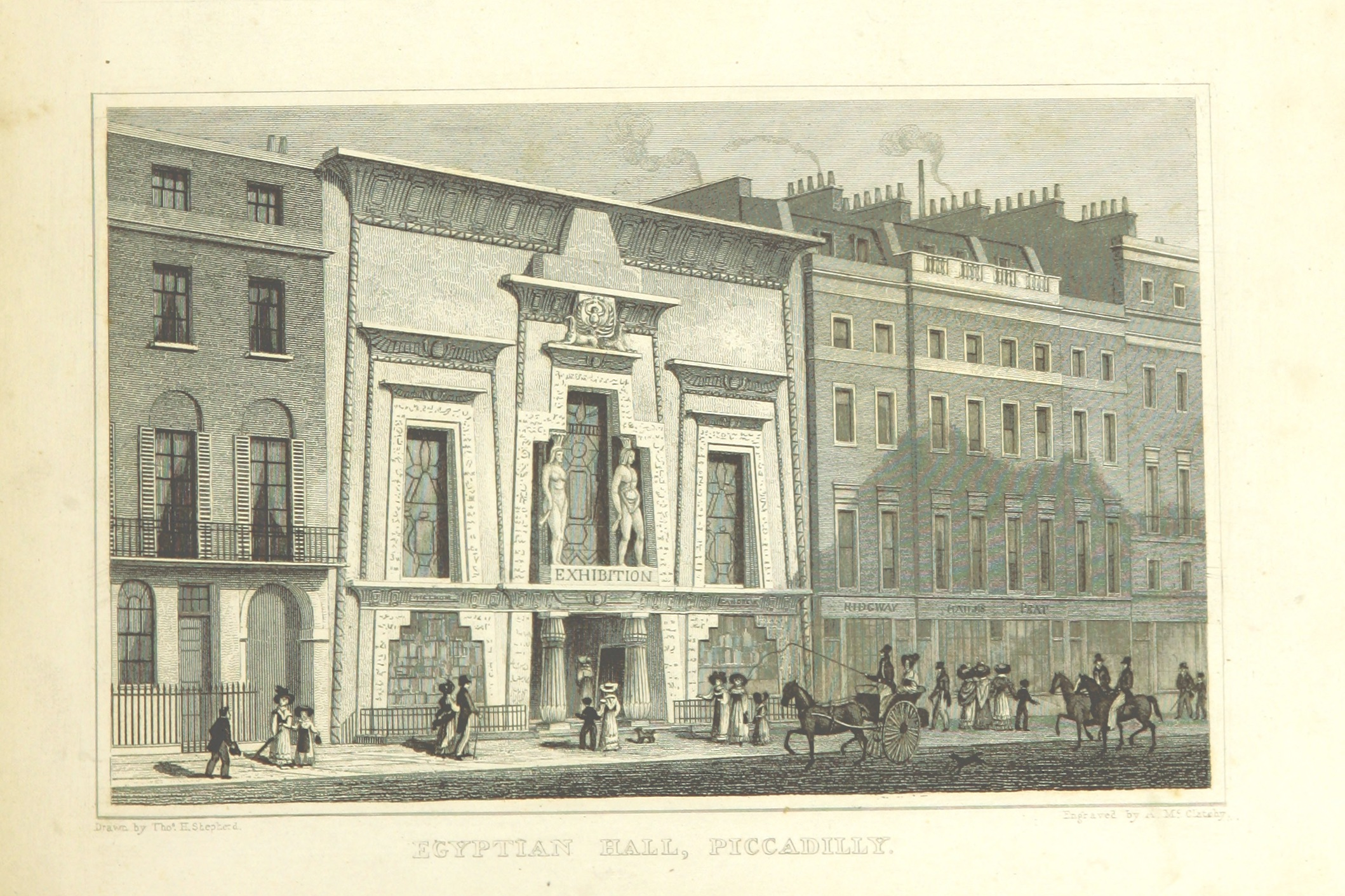
Egyptian Hall, Piccadilly - Shepherd, Metropolitan Improvements (1828), p. 295

The Egyptian Hall in Piccadilly, London, commissioned by William Bullock as a museum to house his collection of curiosities was completed in 1812 at a cost of £16,000. It was amongst the first buildings in England to be influenced by the Egyptian style, The building was demolished in 1905.

=== Egyptian Library, Devonport ===
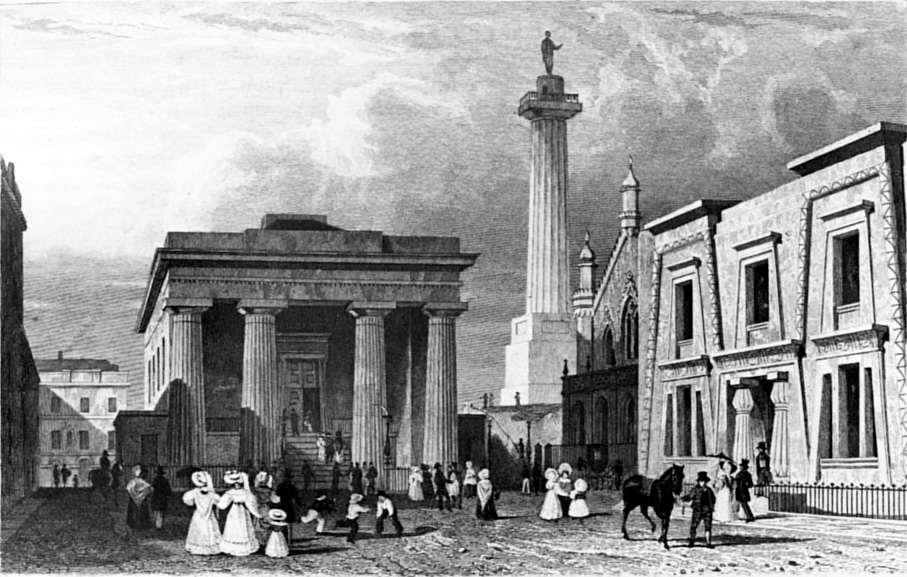
J Foulston's Town Hall, Column and Egyptian Library in Devonport

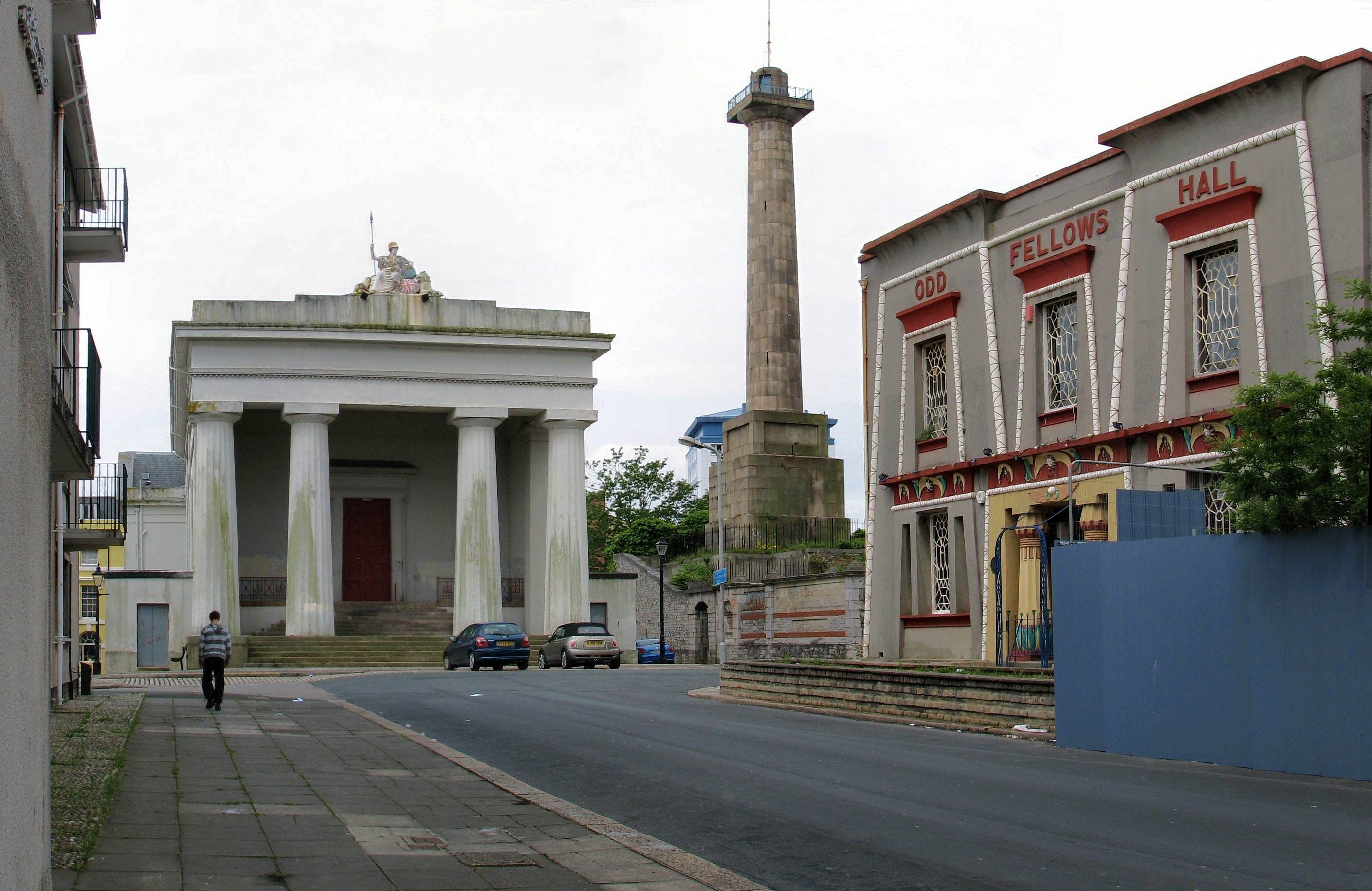
Same view in 2008

John Foulston (1772 – 30 December 1841) was a pupil of Thomas Hardwick and set up a practice in London in 1796. In 1810 he won a competition to design the Royal Hotel and Theatre group of buildings in Plymouth, Devon, and after relocating he remained Plymouth's leading architect for twenty-five years. Most of Foulston's work was in the Greek Revival style, but his best known project was the creation of a group of buildings in Ker Street, Devonport in 1821–24. This eclectic group consisted of a Greek Doric town hall and commemorative column; a terrace of houses in Roman Corinthian style and two houses in Greek Ionic; a "Hindoo" nonconformist chapel; and an "Egyptian" library. The Library became the Odd Fellows Hall, and today is a public House. Of these, all but the chapel and the houses survive, and are Grade I listed.

=== Egyptian House, Penzance, Cornwall ===
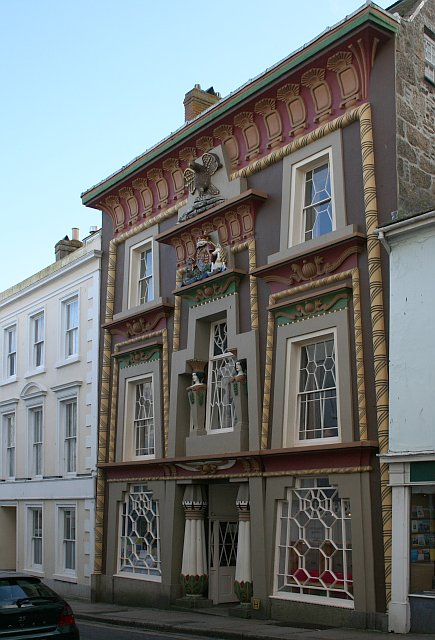
The Egyptian House, Chapel Street, Penzance

1835–37: Egyptian House, Penzance was built by local bookseller John Lavin as a museum. There is some dispute over the architect and the date of build. In his Guide to Penzance, published in 1845, J S Courtney describes the building as ... the astonishing gaudy and eccentric Egyptian House recently built by John Lavin, mineralogist and Egyptologist. On this basis the design has been attributed to John Lavin. Other possible architects might be John Foulston who designed the Egyptian library at Devonport or possibly Peter Robinson the architect of the Egyptian Hall in Piccadilly, London and who also rebuilt Trelissick the seat of Thomas Daniell in 1824–25. The restoration in 1973 by the Landmark Trust revealed the original gaudy paint colours, which had been painted onto Coade Stone mouldings.

=== Mechanics Institute or Camera Obscura House, Stamford, Lincolnshire ===
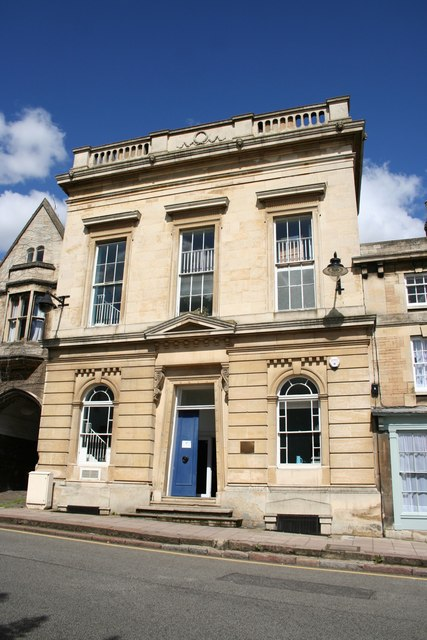
Camera Obscura House, Stamford, Lincolnshire

A handsome building by the Stamford architect Bryan Browning of 1842. This has an Egyptian style portal, but the remainder of the building is in a Grecian style of architecture.

=== Old Synagogue, King Street Canterbury ===
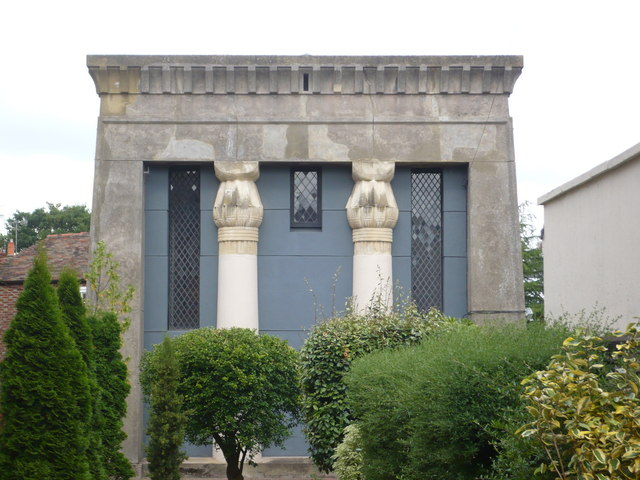
The Old Synagogue, King's Street - Canterbury 1848

1846–48: The Old Synagogue, King's Street Designed in the Egyptian style by Hezekiah Marshall and opened in 1848, it was acquired by King's School in 1982 and is now used for lessons and concerts.

=== Masonic Lodge, Boston, Lincolnshire ===
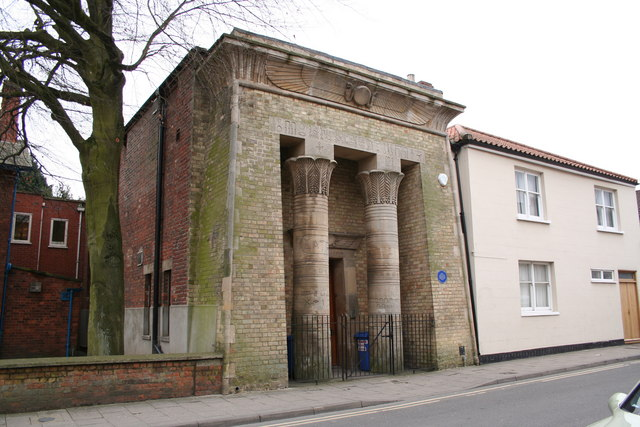
Masonic Lodge, Boston 1860–63

Freemasons' Hall, Main Ridge, Boston, Lincolnshire. Designed by G. Hackford and built 1860–63. The building is plain brick, but its portico is based on that of the Temple of Dandour in Nubia.

=== Churches ===
Egyptian Revival style was not popular as an architectural style with either the Anglican Church in England or the Presbyterian church in Scotland. The only Anglican examples appear to be St John the Evangelist's Church, Chichester, a most unusual octagonal church built, in 1812, Built in 1812 to the design of James Elmes as a proprietary chapel, the octagonal white-brick evangelical preaching house reflects the early 19th-century ideals of the Church of England's evangelical wing before High church movements such as the Cambridge Camden Society changed ideas on church design. The Diocese of Chichester declared it redundant in 1973. Although worship no longer takes place in the building, its theatre-like design has made it a popular venue for concerts and musical events. The church is a combination of styles, including Egyptian Revival, which can be seen most clearly in the capitals. In Glasgow the Anglican Scottish Episcopal Church dedicated to St Jude was built to designs by John Stephen in 1840. The church has a severe but impressive facade based on the pylon with a big monumental doorway. It is now the Malmaison Restaurant.

==== Church Gallery ====
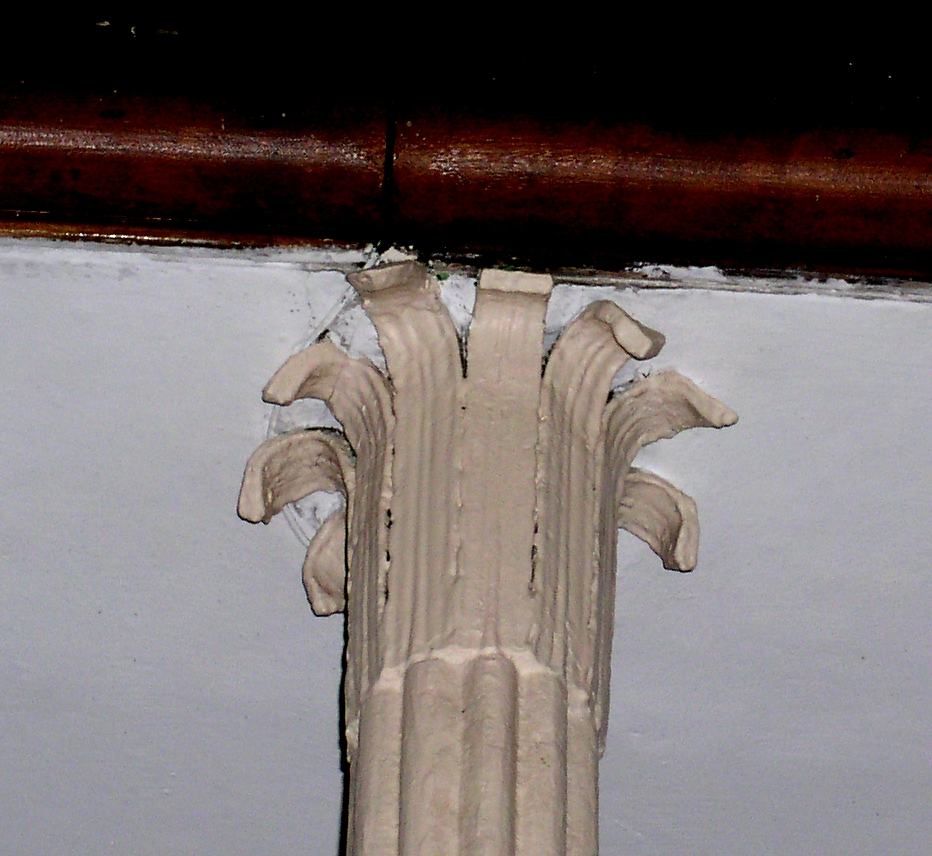
St John the Evangelist, Chichester – Egyptian Revival capital

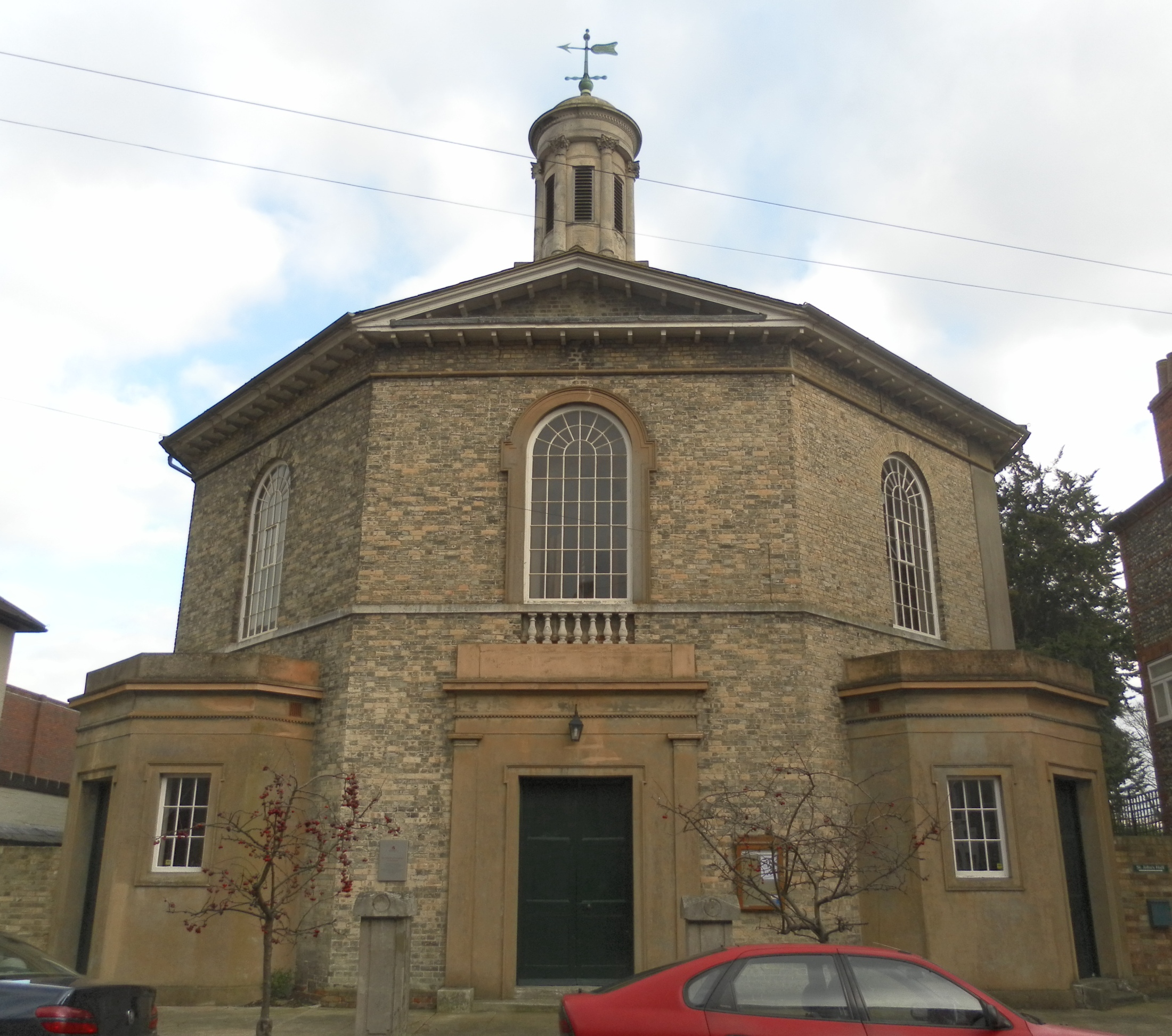
St John the Evangelist's Church, Chichester

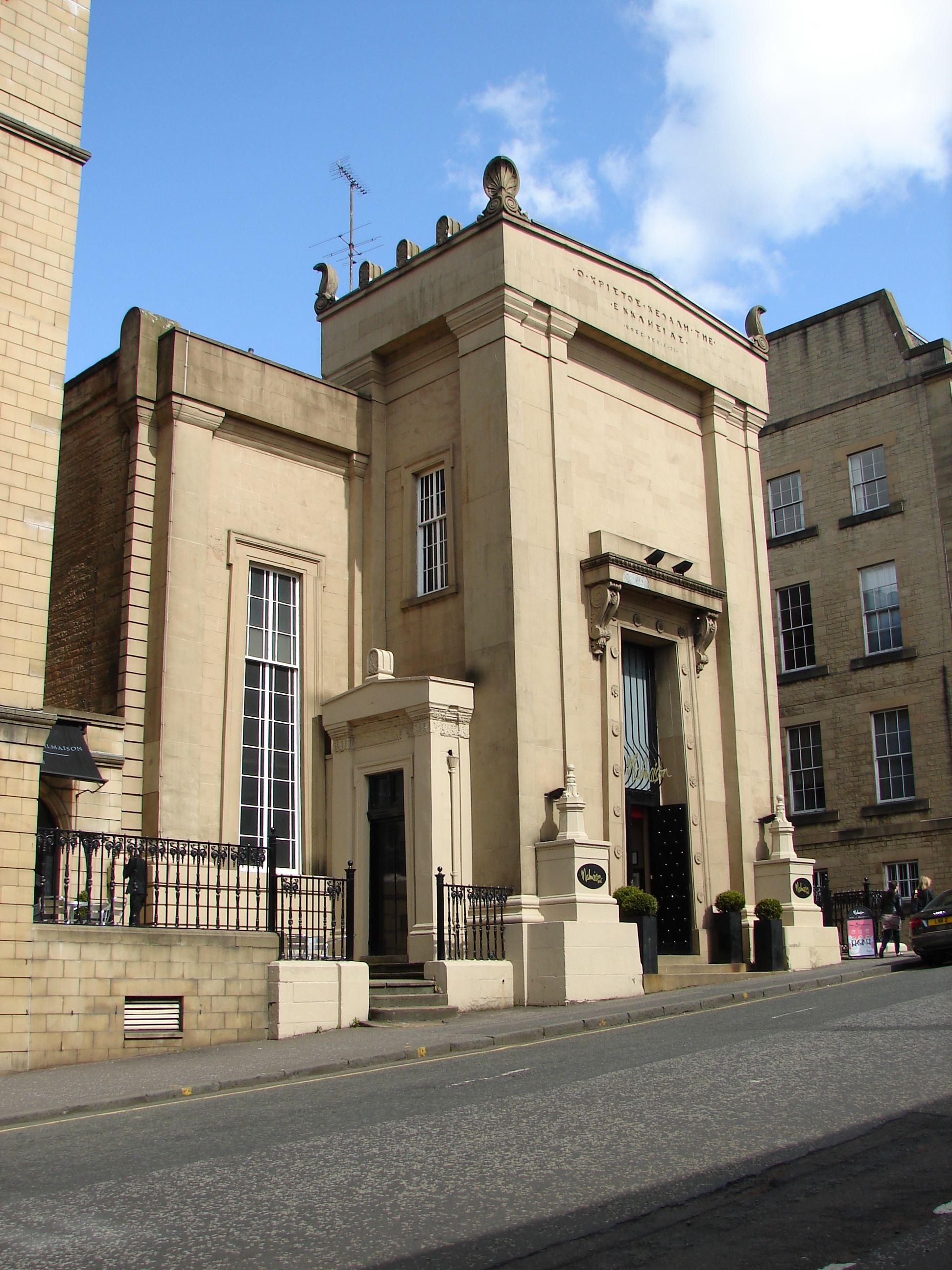
Malmaison Hotel (former St Judes Church)

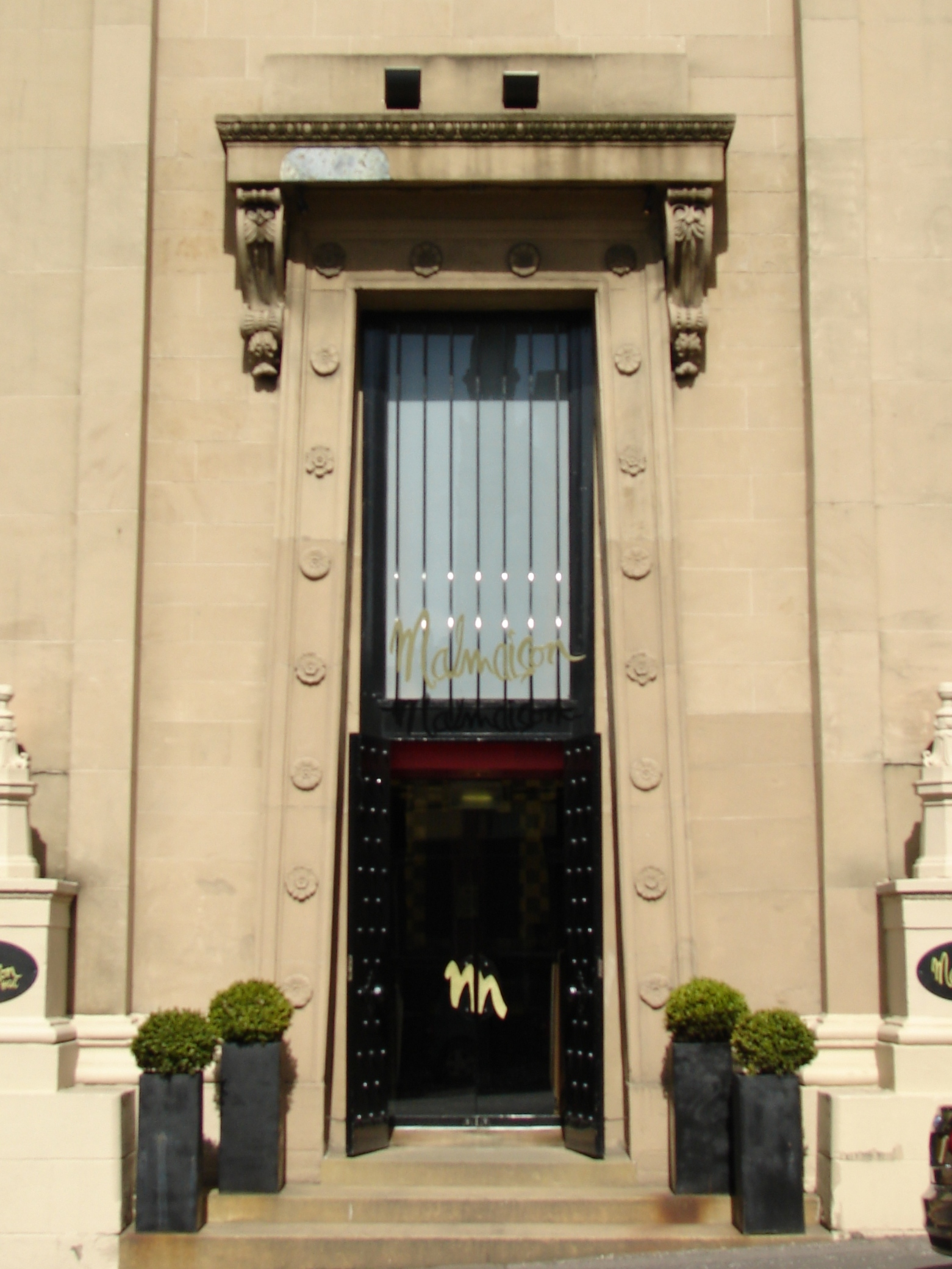
Malmaison Hotel, Glasgow entrance, Former St Jude's church 1840

==== Egyptian Halls, Glasgow ====
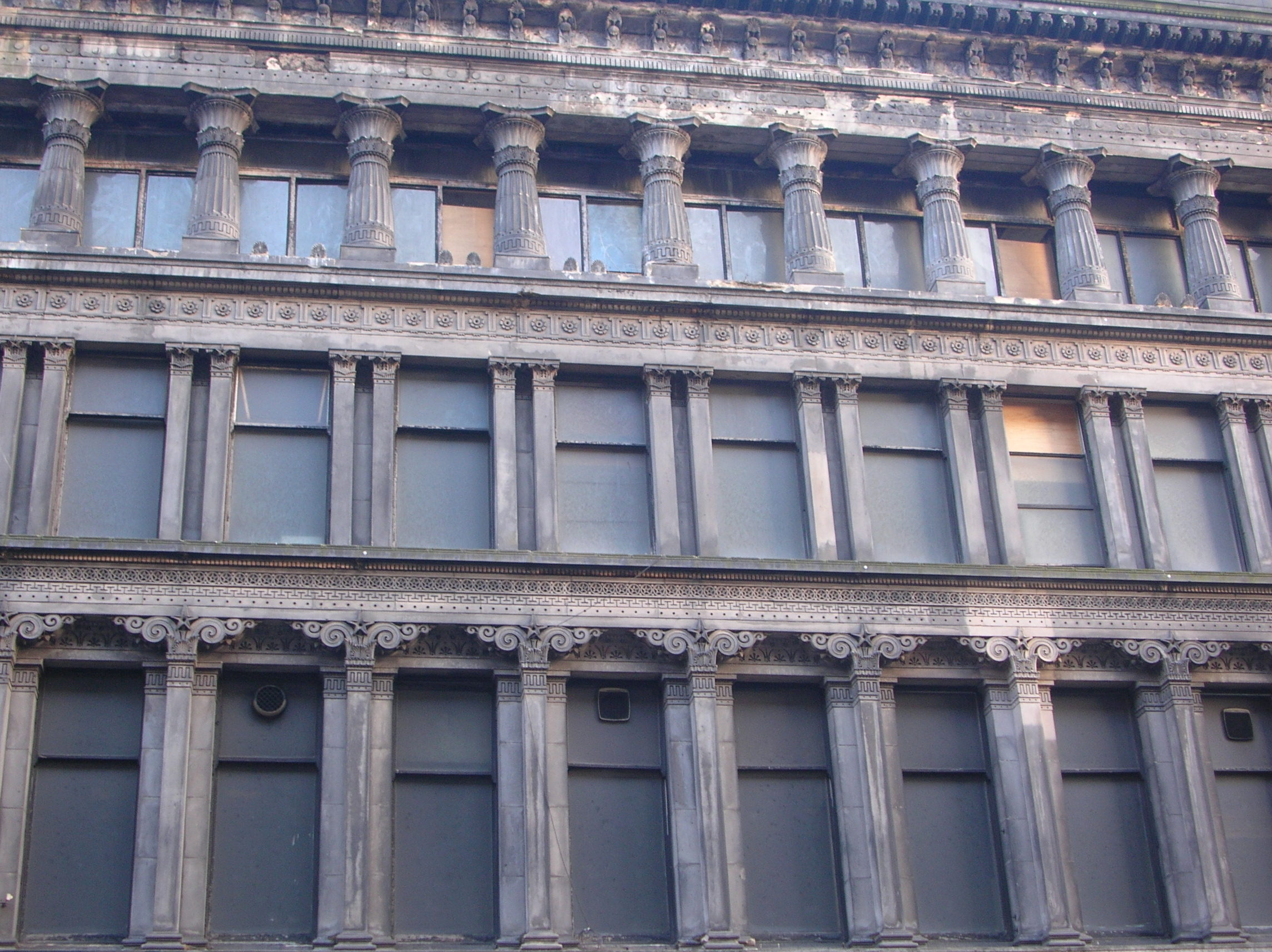
The Egyptian Halls frontage on Union Street

The Egyptian Halls is a category A listed building at 84–100 Union Street, Glasgow, Scotland. It was built in 1870–72 and designed by Alexander "Greek" Thomson. Strictly speaking the Egyptian Halls should be regarded as a Greco-Egyptian Revival building, as it has far stronger classical elements than Egyptian. Work started on the Egyptian Halls in March 1870 to provide new commercial premises for James Robertson, an iron manufacturer; and was completed in 1872. Built using cast iron and stone, the Egyptian Halls was one of the last major projects of Alexander Thomson. The building broke many of the rules of the time; thick stone columns normally found at ground level were on the top floor. The building is built on four storeys. The ground floor was occupied by shops with fully glazed wide bays. The first floor features eighteen window bays divided by square columns with a flowing scroll capital. On the second floor, shorter couple columns are positioned exactly above the first floor columns, again above these columns is a decorative entablature with a Roman-style decoration. Finally, on the third floor is a plinth with dwarf columns and pseudo-Egyptian lotus flower capitals. Behind these columns is a continuous glazed screen, which is not fixed to these columns. Topping these columns is another entablature with a cornice. This 'attic' room is lit by a series of sloping skylights.

== Cemeteries and mausolea ==
Egyptian Revival architecture was widely used both as for the design if building associated with cemeteries and for individual tombs and monuments. Following the Metropolitan General Cemetery Act 1832 (2 & 3 Will. 4. c. cx) seven cemeteries known as the Magnificent Seven cemeteries were developed on the outskirts of London. They were based on the idea of garden cemeteries and particularly the Père Lachaise Cemetery in Paris, which had been founded by Napoleon in 1802. A cemetery based on the garden cemeteries of France and was the Mount Auburn Cemetery near Boston in the United States which was started in 1831 and the Egyptian Revival style was adopted for the buildings and many of the monuments. The first of the Metropolitan cemetery was Kensal Green cemetery which was started in 1832 and includes some Egyptian style monuments, as does also the Glasgow Necropolis of the same year. Highgate Cemetery, was designed by Stephen Geary and in 1838–39 he laid out the Egyptian Avenue and inner circle of the Lebanon Circle which provided entrances to the catacombs.

=== Sheffield General Cemetery ===
In Sheffield the Sheffield General Cemetery which was opened in 1836 as a Nonconformist cemetery, was a response to the rapid growth of Sheffield and the relatively poor state of the town's churchyards. The cemetery, with its Greek Doric and Egyptian style buildings, were designed by Sheffield architect Samuel Worth (1779–1870) on the site of a former quarry. The main building in the cemetery showing Egyptian features are The Gatehouse (Grade II* listed) built directly over the Porter Brook in a Classical architectural style with Egyptian features. The Egyptian Gate (Grade II* listed) forms the entrance to the cemetery on Cemetery Road. It is richly ornamented and possesses gates bearing ouroboros, two coiled snakes holding their tails in their mouths. The Nonconformist chapel (Grade II* listed) is built in a classical style with Egyptian features. The sculpted panel above the door shows a dove, representing the Holy Ghost or the Holy Spirit. Stone steps lead down to a wall with catacomb-like entrances.

=== Abney Park Cemetery 1838–40, Hackney, London ===
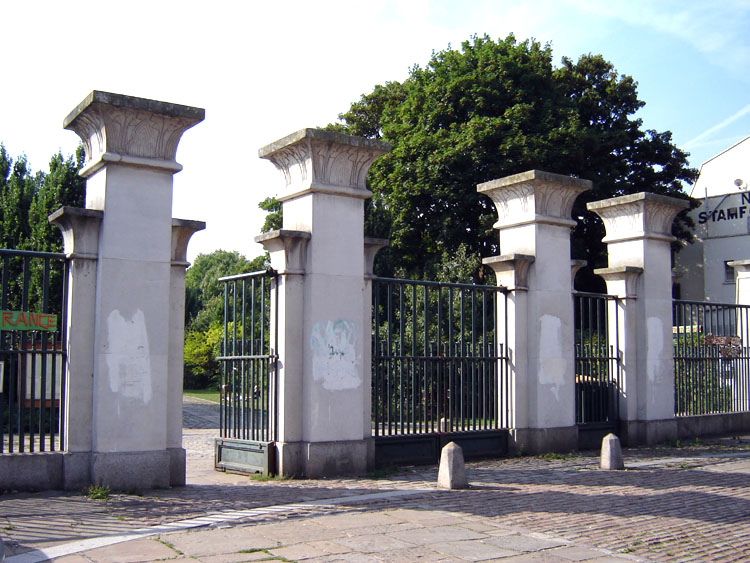
Abney Park east gate

The Abney Park cemetery was laid out in the landscaped grounds of Abney House in Stoke Newington, which had been the home of Lady Abney, a leading early 18th century Non-conformist. One of the "Magnificent Seven" parkland cemeteries created in the early Victorian period, albeit set out in an entirely different way to the others and with somewhat wider purposes, Abney Park features an entrance designed by William Hosking FSA in collaboration with Joseph Bonomi the Younger and the cemetery's founder George Collison II. This frontage was built by John Jay in the then increasingly popular Egyptian Revival style, with hieroglyphics signifying the "Abode of the Mortal Part of Man":

=== Tombs and buildings in cemeteries ===
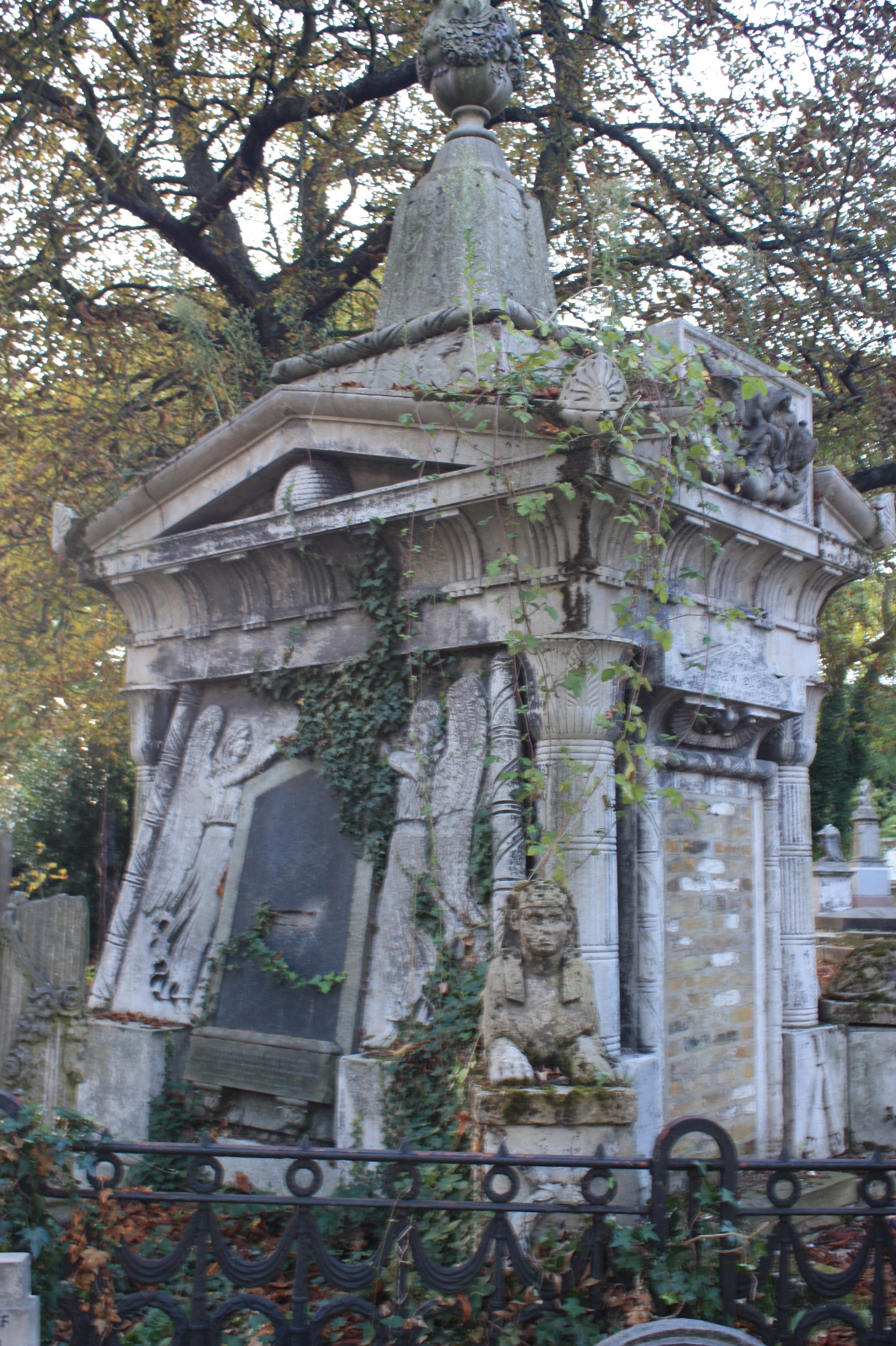
Andrew Ducrow's grave, Kensal Green Cemetery

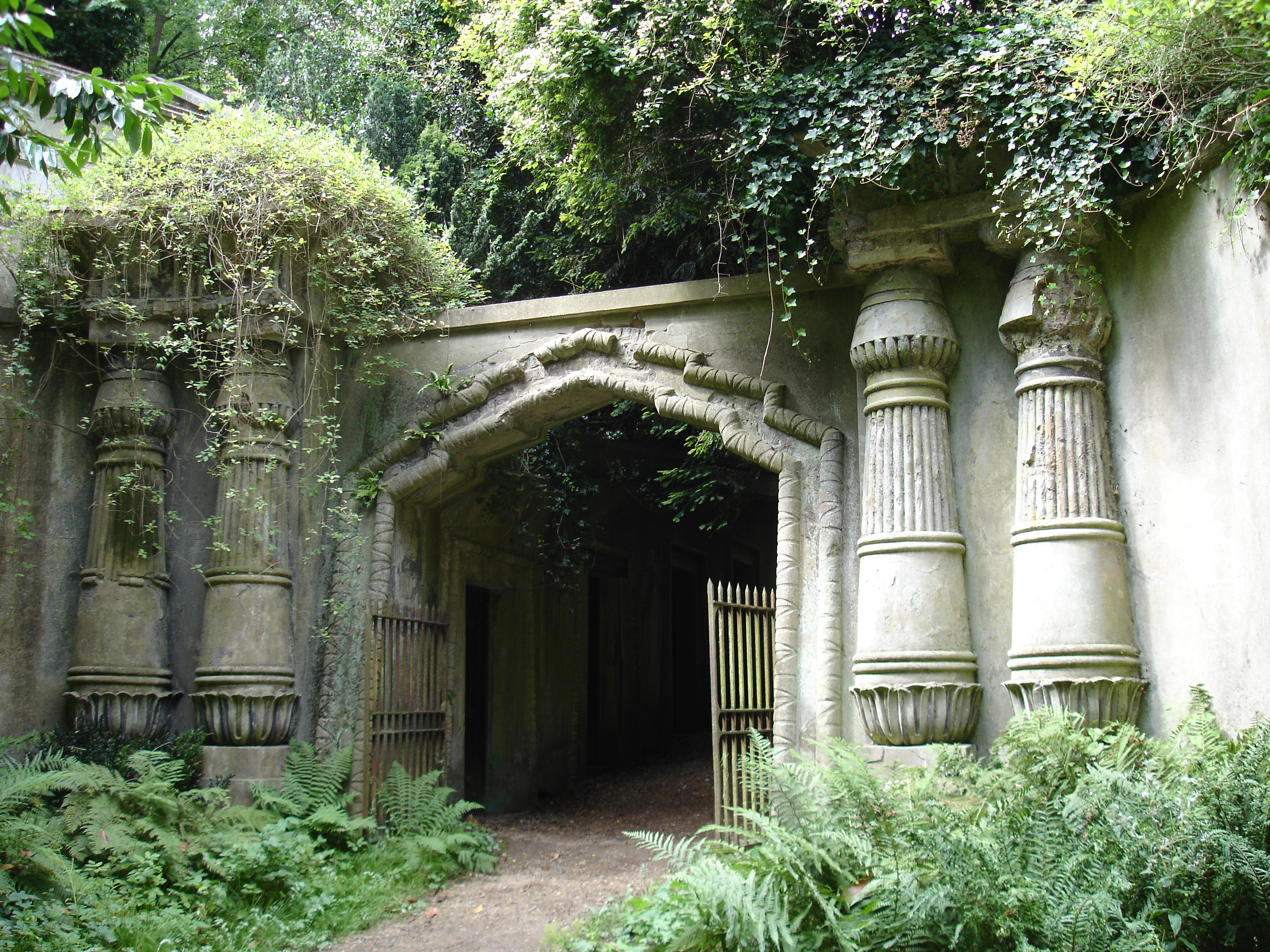
Egyptian Avenue Highgate Cemetery

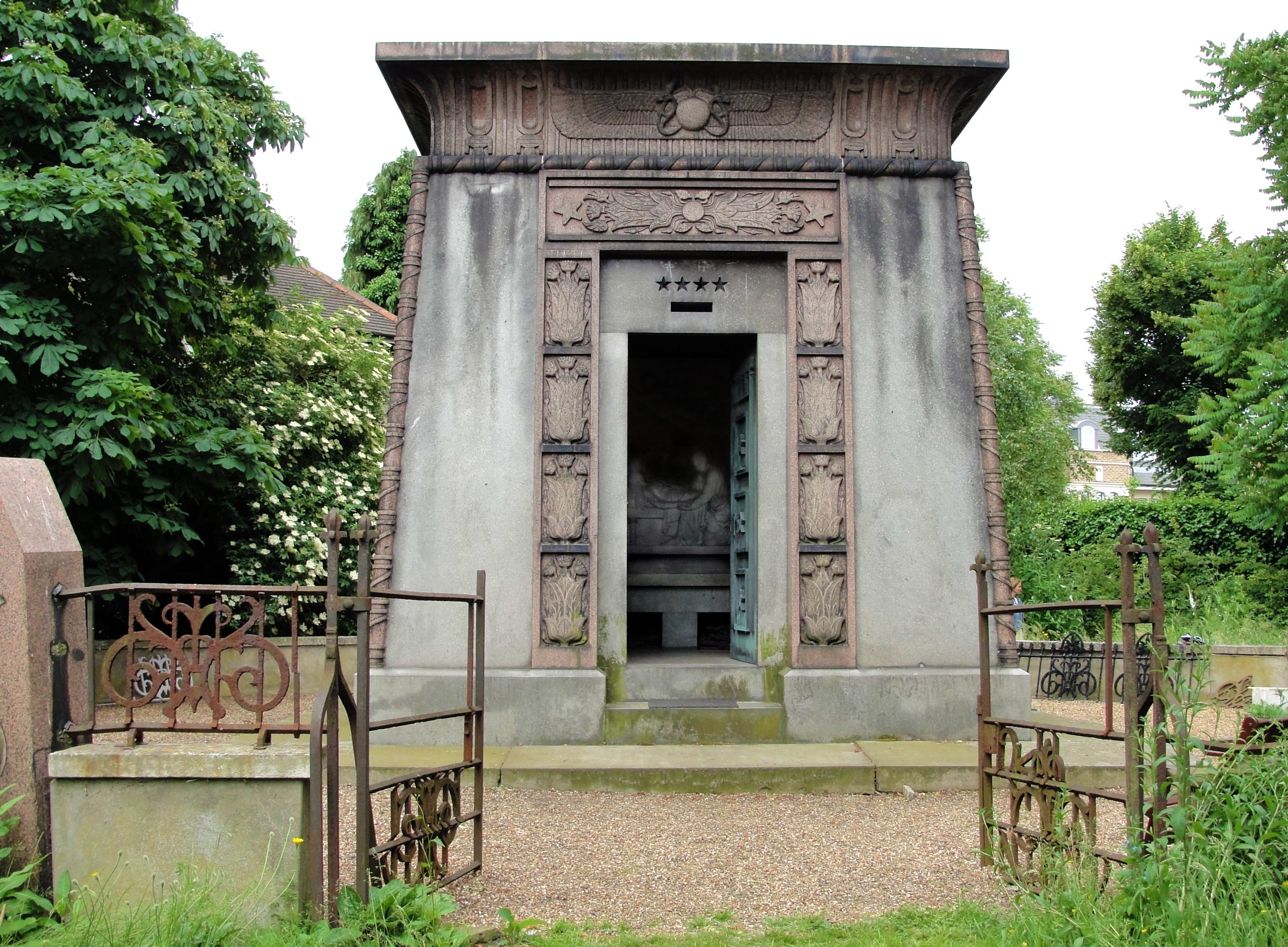
Entrance to The Kilmorey Mausoleum Richmond on Thames

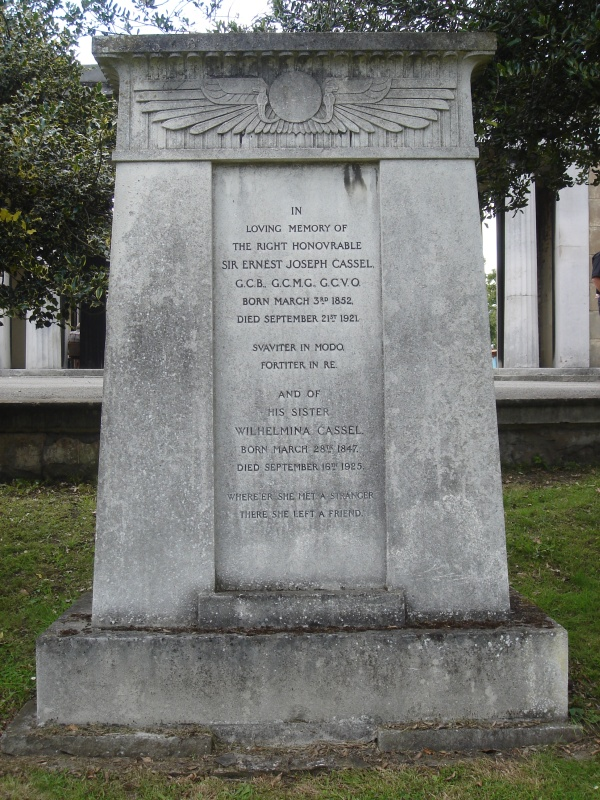
ErnestCassel, Kensal Green Cemetery, c. 1925

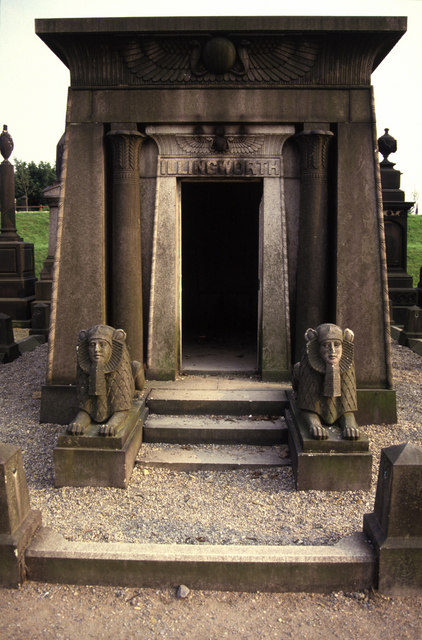
Illingworth tomb, Undercliffe Cemetery, Bradford

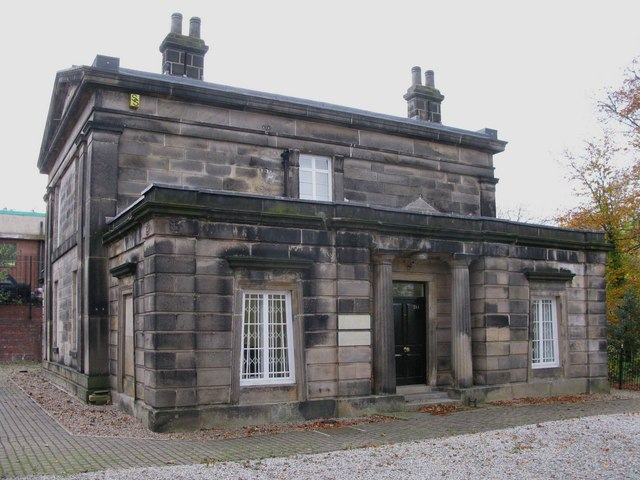
The Registrar's House, Sheffield General Cemetery

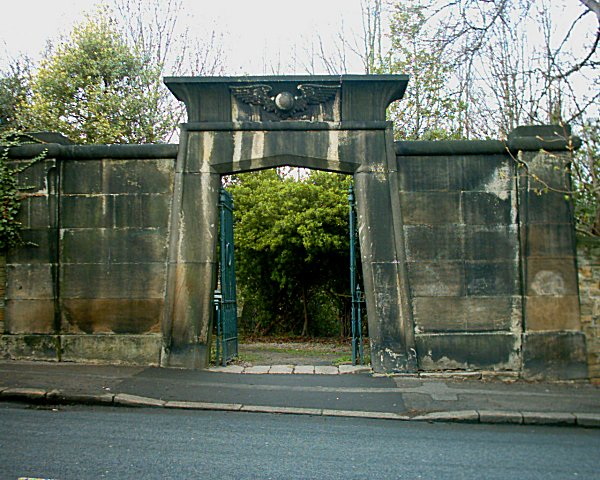
Sheffield General Cemetery - Egyptian Gate

== Industrial and transport examples ==
Whereas the use of Egyptian Revival architecture is rare for domestic buildings it was more often used by Victorian archits for industrial and for buildings such as waterworks and sewage plants. The concept of the pylon, was readily embraced by Civil Engineers as support structures such as bridges.

=== Gateway to the Sleaford Navigation Terminal ===
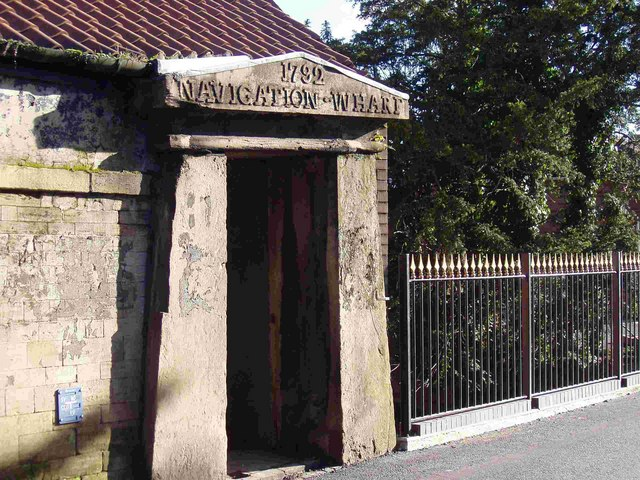
Navigation Wharf, Sleaford, Lincolnshire.

This was the gateway to the wharf of the Sleaford Navigation at Sleaford which opened in 1794. It appears to predate all other examples of Egyptian Revival architecture in England. It is likely that the design was the inspiration of Sir Joseph Banks, who was the leading promoter of the Navigation and is known to have had a strong interest in Egyptian antiquities. The design of the gateway is likely to be by William Jessop the engineer to the Navigation.

=== Lord Bute's Ironworks, Rhymney ===
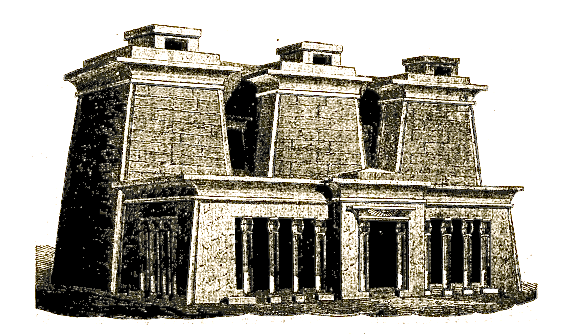
Iron furnaces at the Egyptian Ironworks in 1828

The Bute Ironworks were established by the Marquis of Bute in 1824 near Rhymney in Glamorganshire. It was managed initially by William Forman under the name of the South Wales Mining Company. The original plan was to build 24 furnaces in an Egyptian style. Six of these furnaces were built between 1824 and 1839. They were designed by John Macculloch and the decorative detail of the Bute Works were said to resemble the ruins of Dendera. Initially the economic circumstances of the time adversely effected their profitability. However, after amalgamation with the Rhymney ironworks they started to flourish. A view of the ironworks was probably painted by Penry Williams around 1844 is now in the National Library of Wales.

=== Temple Mill or Marshall's Mill, Leeds ===
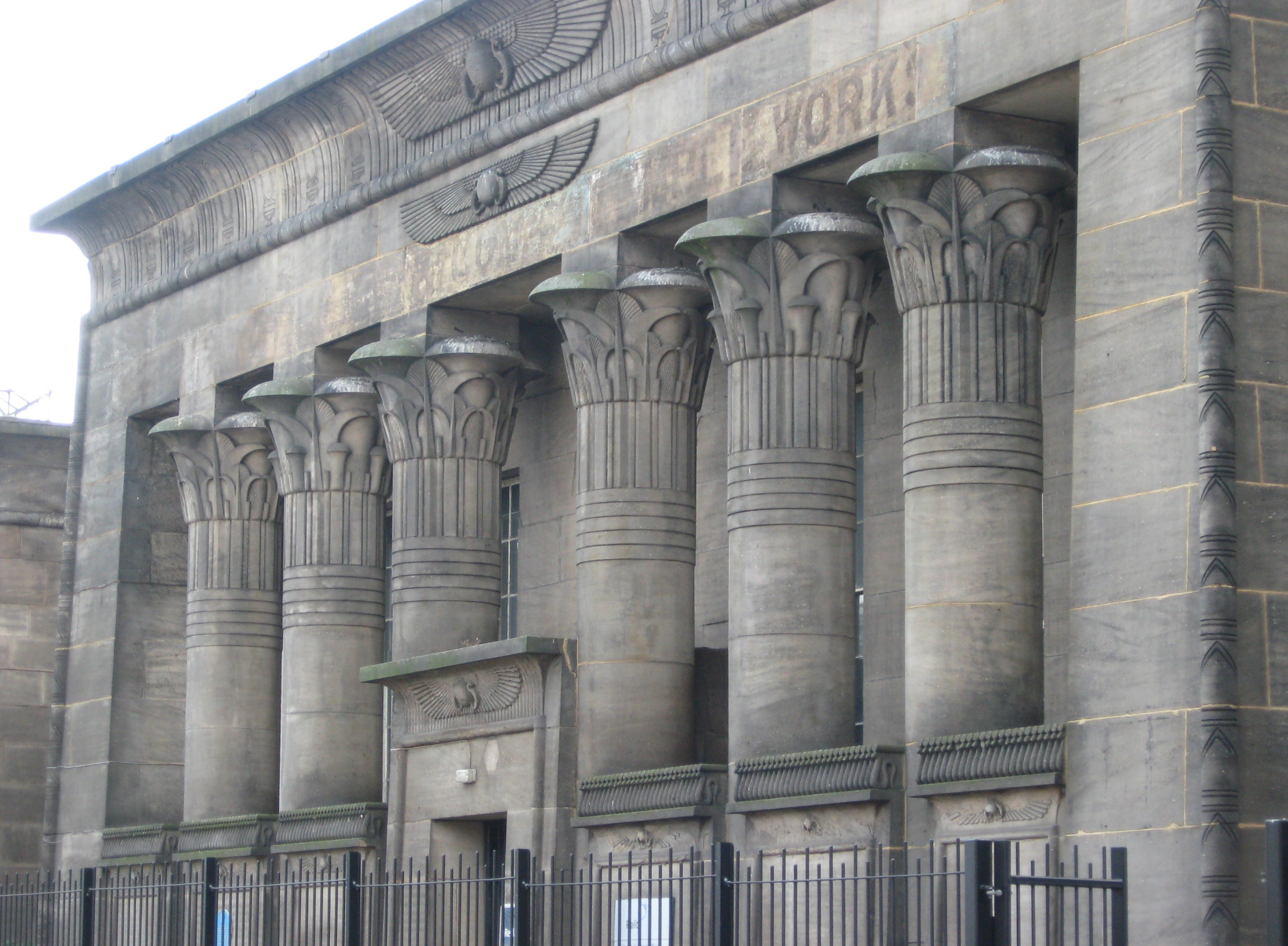
Temple Works

Marshall's Mill (also known as Temple Mill) was once a thriving flax mill, constructed as part of John Marshall's flax empire. Designed by James Bonomi, who worked for the Marshall family, the 396-foot-long and 216-foot-wide building was constructed with an ancient-Egyptian facade, as well as some interior decoration. Completed in around 1840, with offices added two years later, its vast single-storey weaving shed was described by some as the "single largest room in the world".

=== Former East Farleigh Waterworks ===
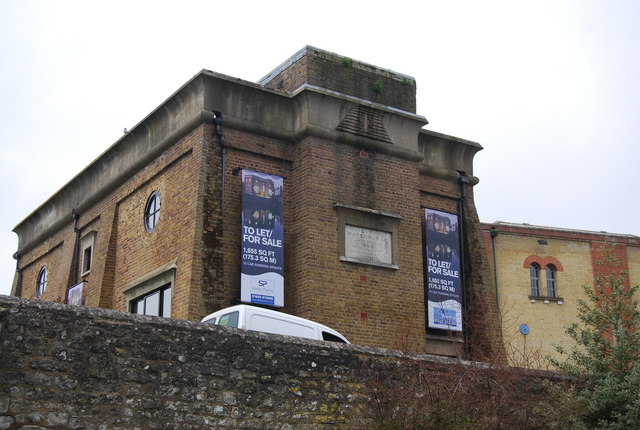
Maidstone Waterworks, East Farleigh 1860

The East Farleigh Waterworks are now converted into offices. Built in 1860, by James Pilbrow, in an Egyptian style. Gault brick in English bond. Rectangular with two storeys. Battered clasping buttress to each corner, and two set close together towards centre of each long side, all running into deep brick plat band under eaves. Rendered coved cornice with deep roll to base and chamfer to top. Low rendered parapet. Truncated projecting brick stack, formerly tall and tapering, filling most of east gable end, with cornice carried round it and bearing the initial "P". Single-storey section in a similar style adjoining north-west corner. Two doorways with rendered coved and splayed cornices flanking base of stack to east.

=== Scottish lighthouses and keepers cottages ===
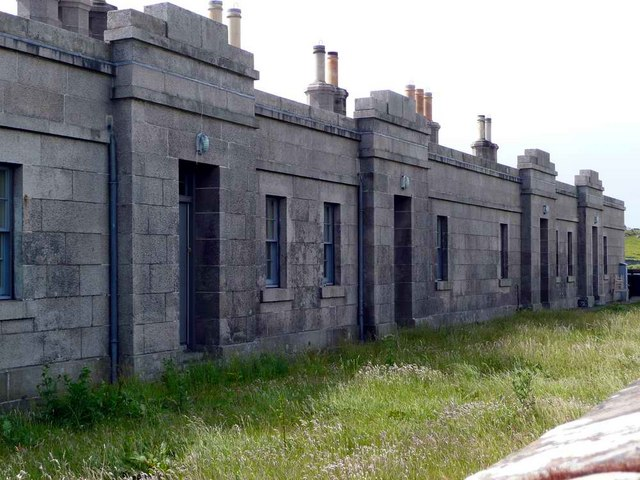
Lighthouse-keepers' housing at Hynish, Tiree

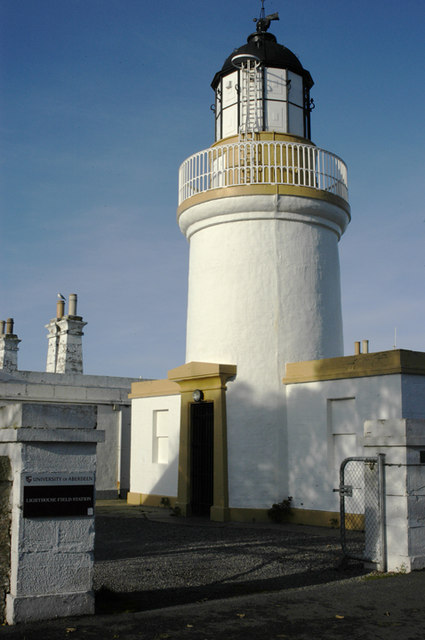
Cromarty Lighthouse

In Scotland 10 lighthouses were built for the Northern Lighthouse in the 1830s and 1840s by Robert Stevenson and his son Alan. At Hynish on Tiree in the Inner Hebrides, a barrack block was built for the lighthouse keepers which have massive pylon shaped doorways. These Keepers' cottages were to service the Skerryvore lighthouse on a remote reef that lies off the west coast of Scotland, 12 miles (19 kilometres) south-west of the island of Tiree. At lighthouses such as Cromarty, Alan Stevenson designed a massive entrance doorway with battered jambs.

== Suspension bridges with pylons ==
=== Menai Bridge ===
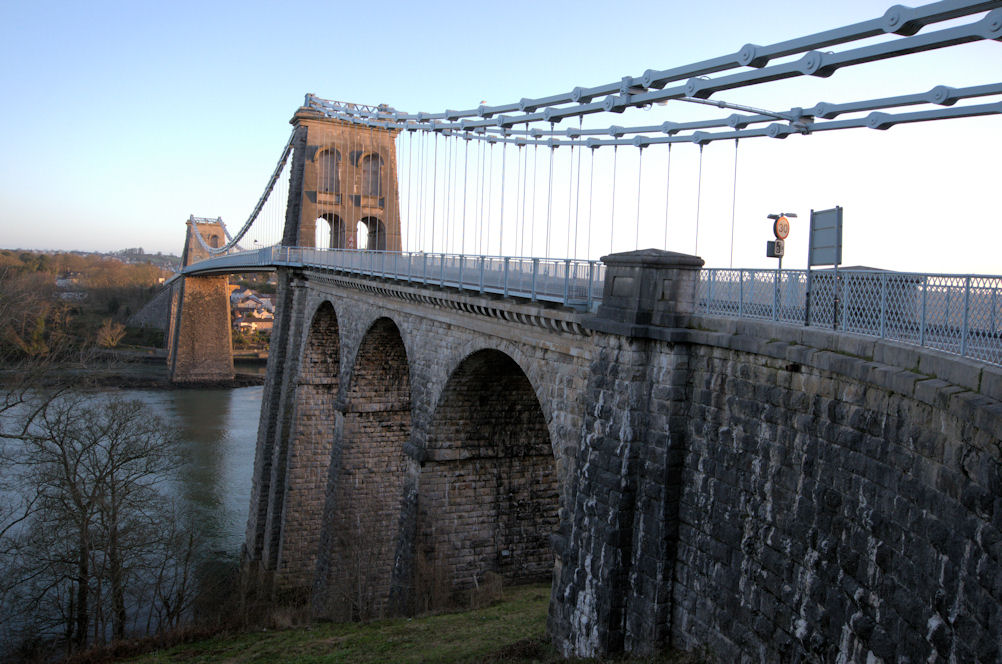
Menai Suspension Bridge

The idea to use Egyptian Pylons for the supports of a suspension appears first to have been applied by Thomas Telford for the Menai Bridge. This was started in 1819 and completed in 1826.

=== Clifton Suspension Bridge ===
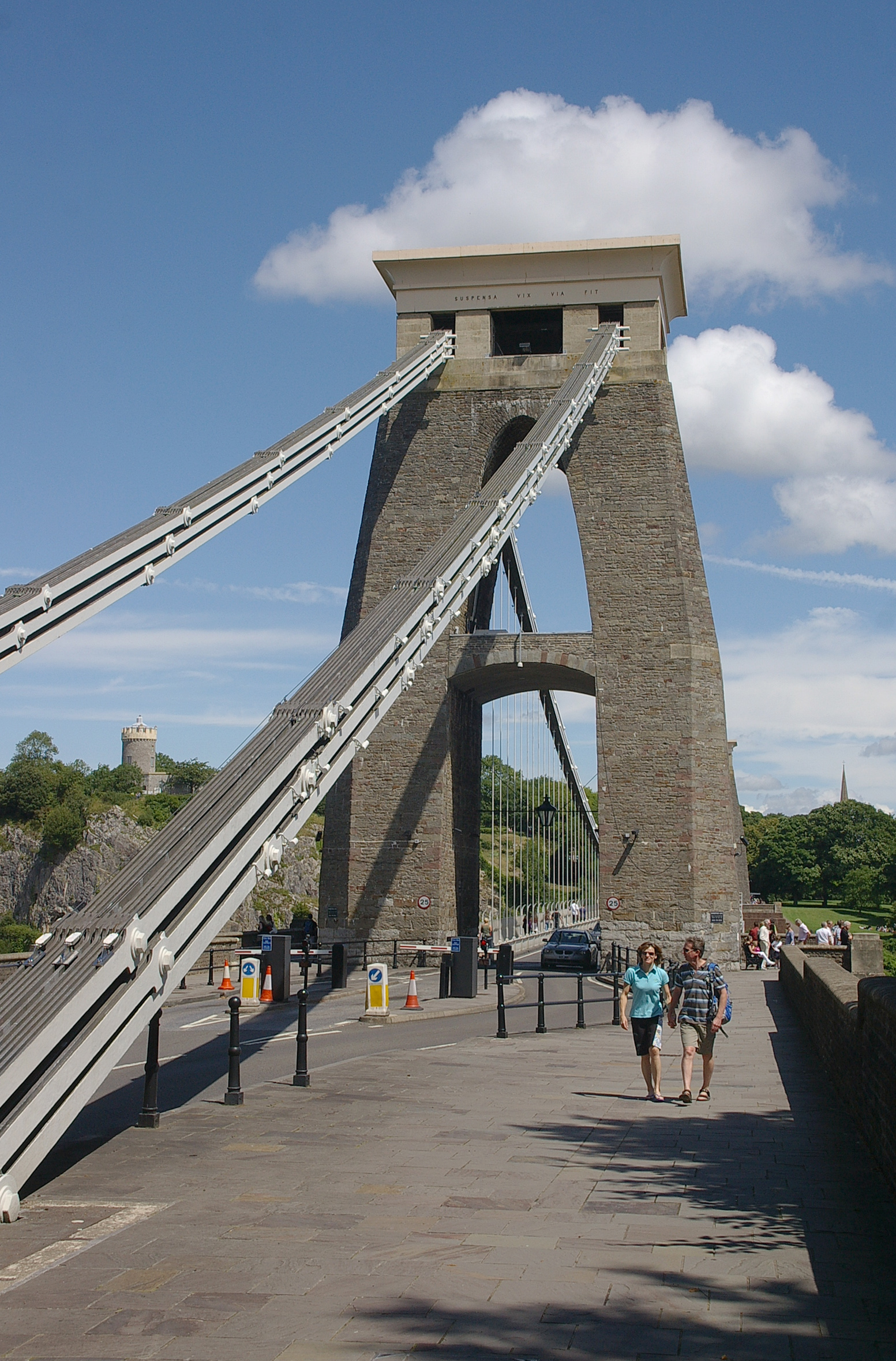
Clifton Suspension Bridge, Bristol

The Clifton Suspension Bridge opening in 1864, used Egyptian-influenced stone towers to support the suspension chains. The bridge was built to a design by William Henry Barlow and John Hawkshaw, based on an earlier design of 1831 by Isambard Kingdom Brunel.

== 20th-century revival ==
Egyptian Revival architecture made a re-appearance in the interwar years between 1919 and 1939 and was used mainly for the decoration of factory buildings and commercial buildings such as cinemas and garages. This revival of interest in the style is attributed to the discovery of Tutankhamun's tomb by Howard Carter in 1922.

=== 1926–28: Carreras Cigarette Factory, Camden, London. ===
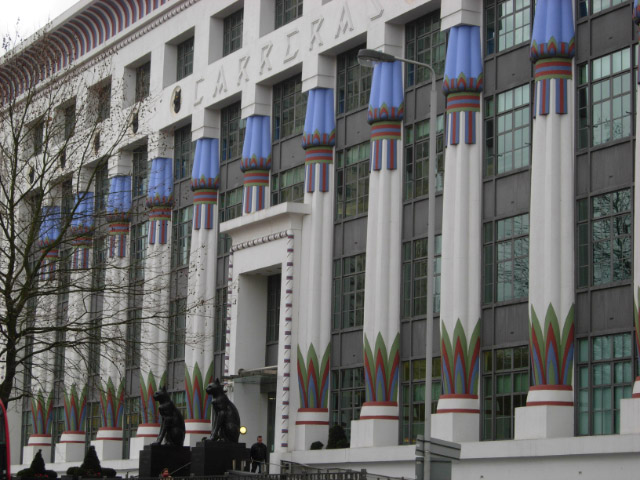
Greater London House, Camden Town - geograph.org.uk - 319426

Greater London House is a striking example of early 20th-century Egyptian Revival architecture in Camden Town, London, inspired by Tutankhamun's tomb. The building was erected in 1926–28 by the Carreras Tobacco Company owned by the Russian-Jewish inventor and philanthropist Bernhard Baron on the communal garden area of Mornington Crescent, to a design by architects M. E. and O. H. Collins and A. G. Porri. It is 550 feet (168 metres) long, and is mainly white, The building's distinctive Egyptian-style ornamentation originally included a solar disc to the Sun-god Ra, two gigantic effigies of black cats flanking the entrance and colourful painted details. When the factory was converted into offices in 1961 the Egyptian detailing was lost, but it was restored during a renovation in the late 1990s and replicas of the cats were placed outside the entrance.

=== Powderhall, Edinburgh ===
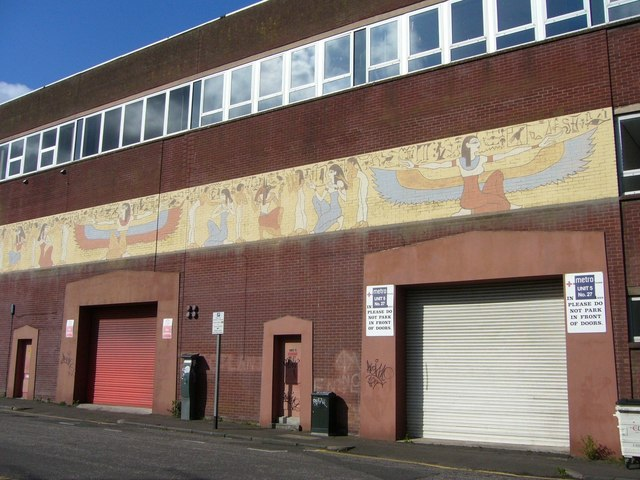
Factory frieze, Powderhall

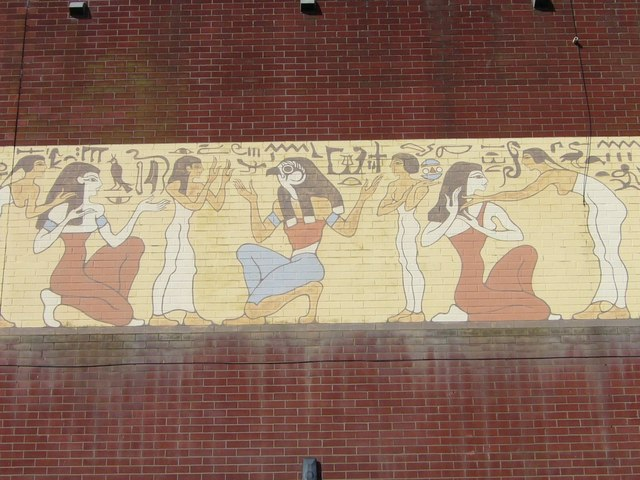
Factory frieze, Powderhall

The former Duncan's chocolate factory in Beaverhall Road, Powderhall, Edinburgh appears to have been built in the 1920s and is most notable for the frieze of Egyptian deities on its facade. The factory is now an arts centre.

=== Cinemas ===
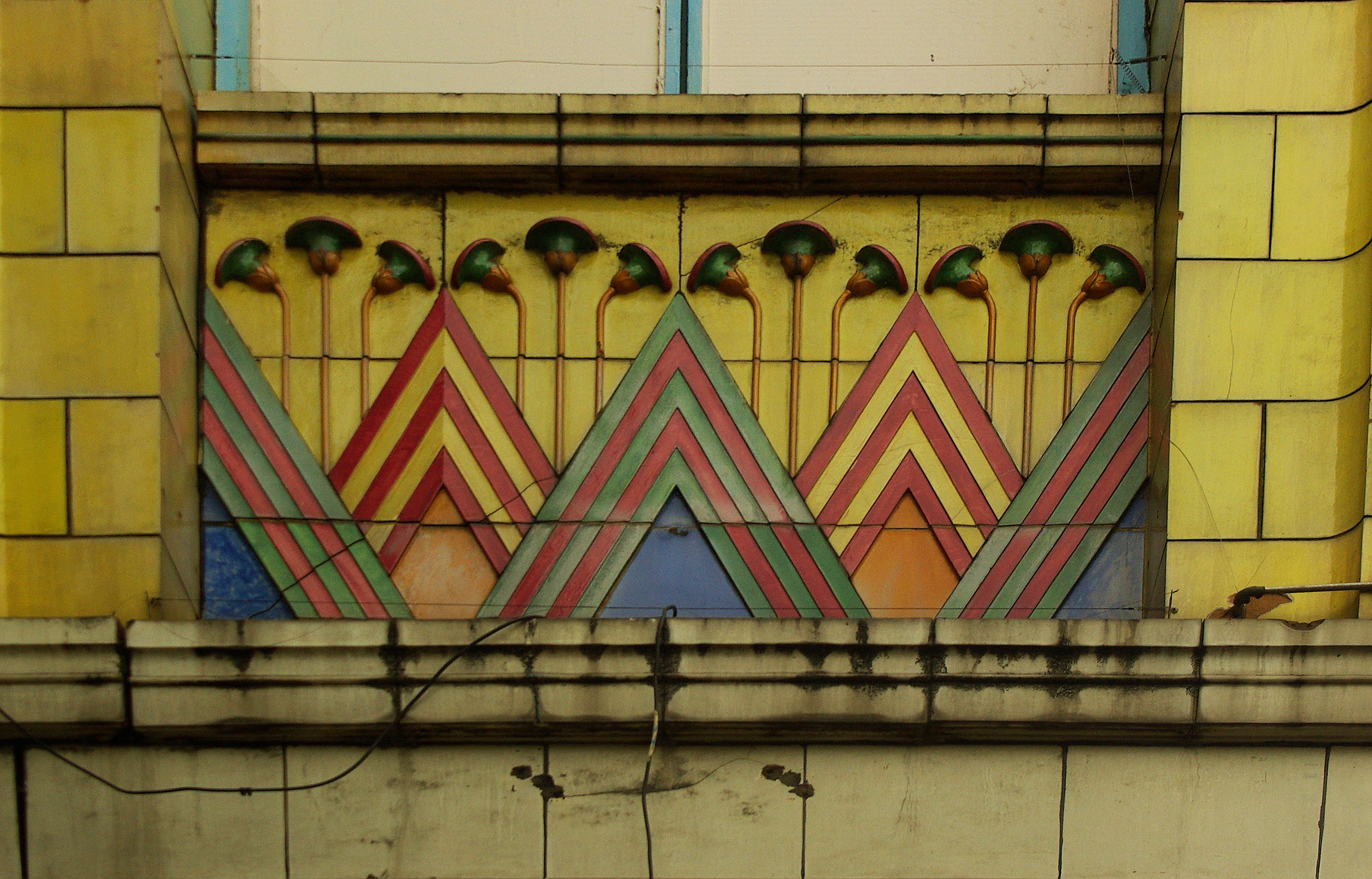
Exterior detail, former Carlton Cinema, Essex Road

In the late 1920s and early 1930s a hybrid Art Deco/Egyptian Revival style evolved, which combined Egyptian motifs and features with Art Deco designs. This was particularly popular for new cinemas, which were intended to give an exotic impression to the cinema-goers. A number of cinemas in this style were designed by George Coles, particularly for the Odeon Cinema chain. Typical of Coles' style Carlton Cinema, Islington and the Troxy in Stepney Green and some other Odeon cinemas across the UK. The façade of these building can be in the form of an Egyptian 'pylon' temple and is decorated with Egyptian iconography including lotus flowers and buds. The used white and decorative faience terracotta tiling on his buildings which was sourced from the Hathern Terracotta works in Leicestershire (now Ibstock plc). The pylon frontage design will also be seen on the Odeon, Altrincham and the Pyramid, Sale.

Examples of these cinemas include:

=== Former Carlton Cinema, Islington ===
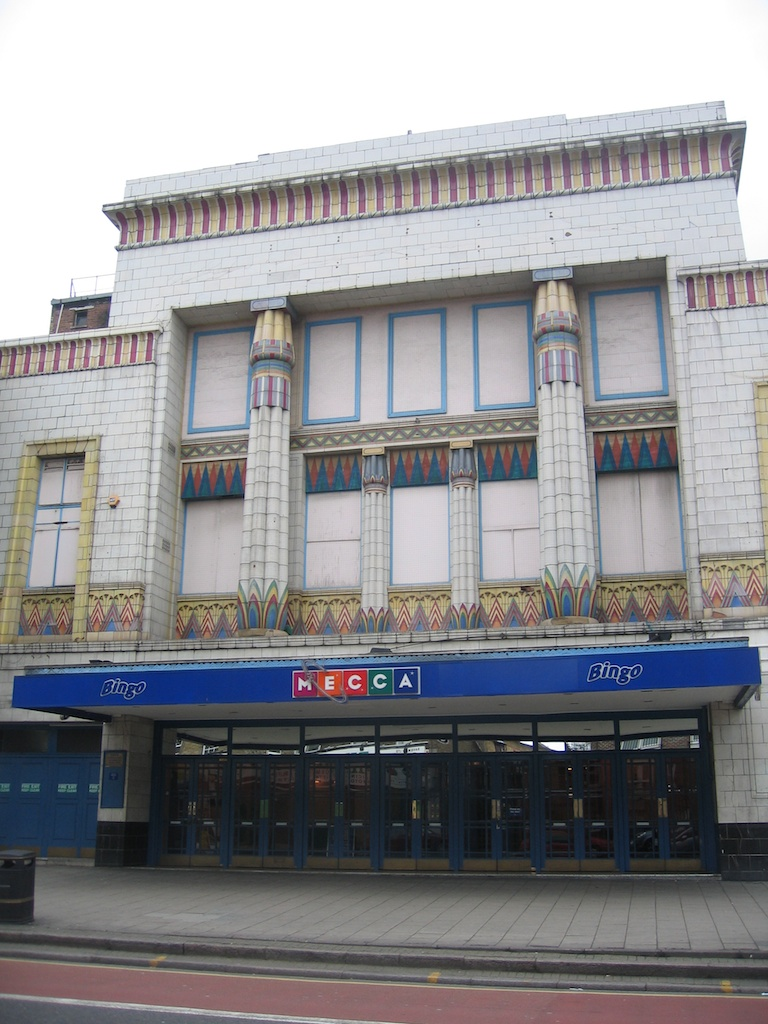
Mecca Bingo Essex Road London N1

Designed by architect George Coles in 1930. Typical of Coles' style such as the Troxy in Stepney Green and some other Odeon cinemas across the UK, the façade of the building is in the form of an Egyptian 'pylon' temple and is decorated with Egyptian iconography including lotus flowers and buds. It is faced with brightly coloured ceramic tiles.

=== Former Pyramid Cinema, Sale (now L A Fitness) ===
Built in around 1933 to seat 1,940 people, Sale's Pyramid Cinema was one of the last Egyptian-style picture houses to be built in Britain. The building was designed by architect Joseph Gomersall and boasted an Egyptian exterior and interior, including an organ that featured pharaonic heads on either side, together with lotus columns and a winged music stand. Externally, the building relied on a series of columns to give it an Egyptian feel, while floral motifs, Egyptian tomb decorations, were used inside.

==== The Govanhill Picture House, Glasgow. ====
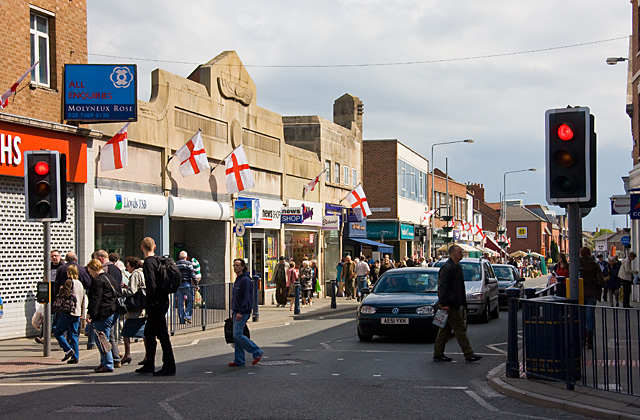
Sherrard Street, Melton Mowbray

A Scottish example of Egyptian Revival cinema is the Govanhill Picture House in Glasgow. Built to the designs of Eric A Sutherland, it featured a unique Egyptian-styled facade, with columns and a moulded scarab above the entranceway. The interior sat 1,200, and although described as having stalls and balcony, the front of the 'balcony' came right down to the rear of the 'stalls' level, with a wooden dividing wall to keep the separate areas apart. The building was sold to ABC Cinemas in 1929, and remained open until 1961.

=== Lloyd's Bank, Sherrard Street, Melton Mowbray ===
A building of uncertain original use is Lloyd's Bank, Sherrard Street, Melton Mowbray. It may have been used for shops or a garage. Above the bank is a concrete facade with Egyptian motifs.

== The later 20th century and 21st century ==
More recently Egyptian motifs have been used in shopping centre developments such as Trafford Centre, Manchester. In 1991–1992 a block of flats by the architects Coltart Earley were constructed for the Molendinar Housing Association. These are situated at the corner of Gallowgate and Bellgrove Street, Glasgow.

=== Sphinx Hill at Moulsford ===
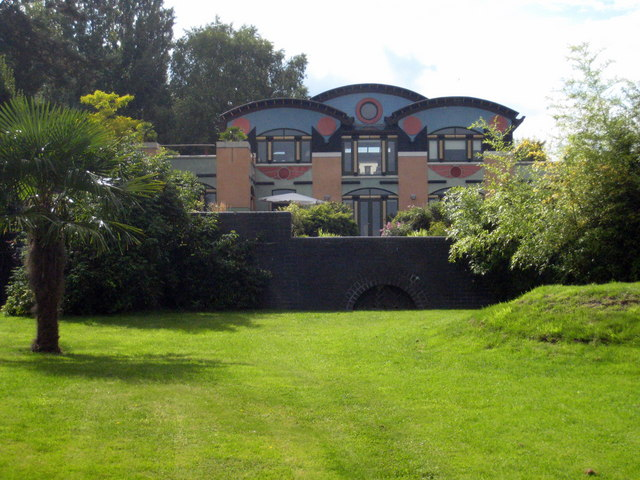
The Egyptian House at Moulsford, Berkshire

Sited on the Isis, close to Oxford, Sphinx Hill was built in 1998–99 by to the designs of the architect John Outram. The design provides a modern rendering of Egyptian motifs. The house is constructed in blockwork, with precast concrete "beam & pot" floors. The roof is framed in timber and clad in copper sheet. A palette of coloured render was developed with a scraped finish, all incorporating black and white flecks to enliven the texture. Extensive use is also made of black, white and cream precast concrete elements. The windows are aluminium clad timber. A central watercourse runs down towards the river through four "Sphinx Pools", with pairs of sphinx sculptures on either side.

== See also ==
- Egyptian Hall, Piccadilly
- Joseph Bonomi the Younger
- Kensal Green Cemetery
- Temple Lodges Abney Park
- Egyptian Revival architecture
