= Holloway Road =

North London shopping street

Coordinates: 51°33′13.87″N 0°6′49.95″W

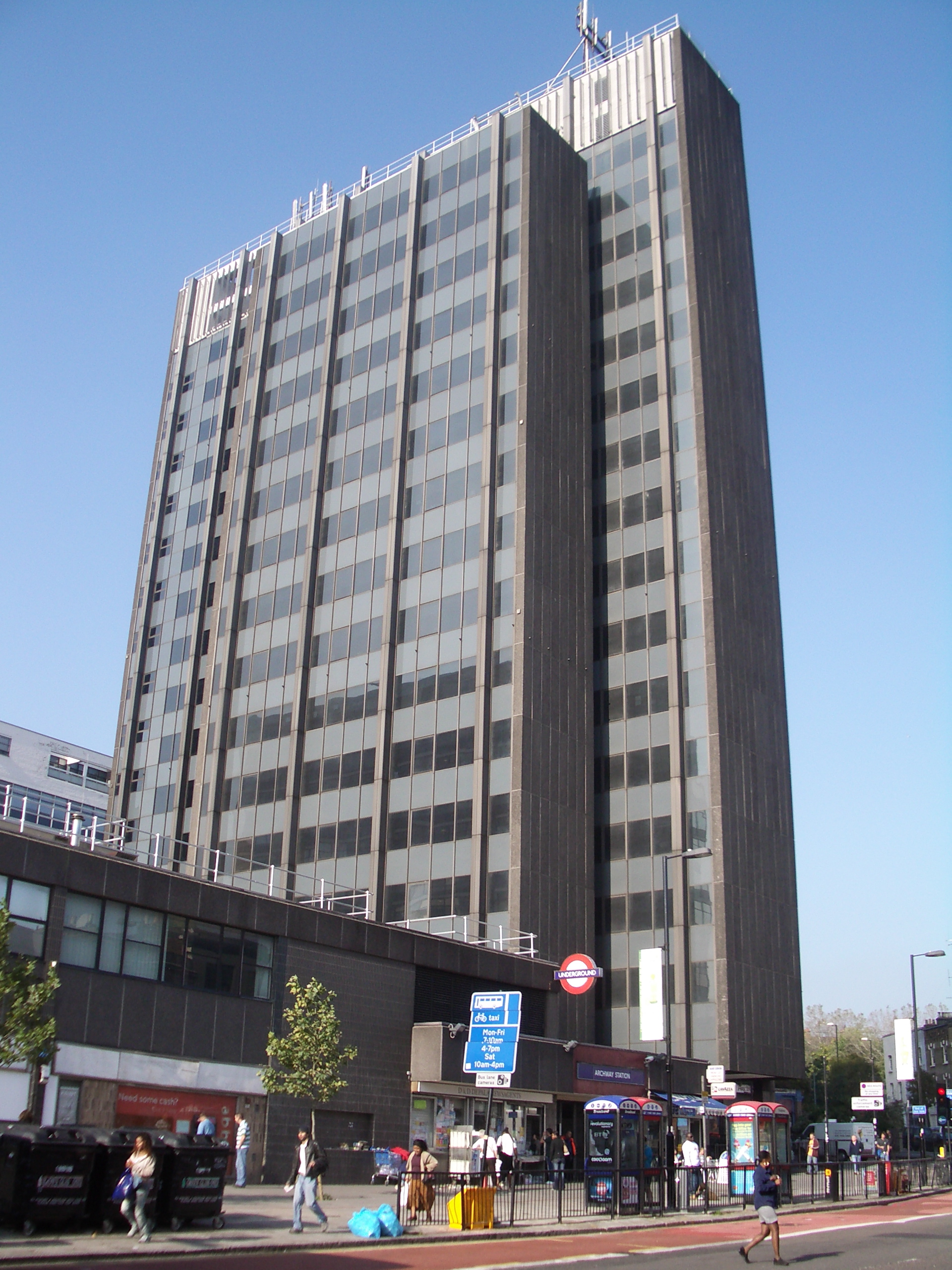
Archway Tower at the junction of Holloway Road and Junction Road.

Holloway Road is a road in London, 1.9 miles long (3km in SI measurements). It is one of the main shopping streets in North London, and carries the A1 road as it passes through Holloway, in the London Borough of Islington. The road starts in Archway, near Archway Underground station, then heads south-east, past Upper Holloway railway station, Whittington Park, past the North London campus of London Metropolitan University near Nag's Head, past Holloway Road Underground station, and the main campus of the university, and then becomes Highbury Corner, near Highbury & Islington station.

== Name ==
The origins of the name are disputed; some believe that it derives from "hollow" due to the dip in the road from the cattle that made their way along the route to the cattle markets in London, whilst some believe it derives from "hallow" and refers to the road's historic significance as part of the pilgrimage route to Walsingham. No documentary evidence can be found to support either derivation.

== History ==
The earliest record giving the name of the road as The Holloway dates from 1307. The main stretch of Holloway Road runs through the site of the villages of Tollington and Stroud. The exact time of their founding is not known, but the earliest record of them dates from 1000. The names ceased to be used by the late 17th century, but are still preserved in the local place names "Tollington Park" and "Stroud Green"; since that time, the area has been known as Holloway.

== Description ==
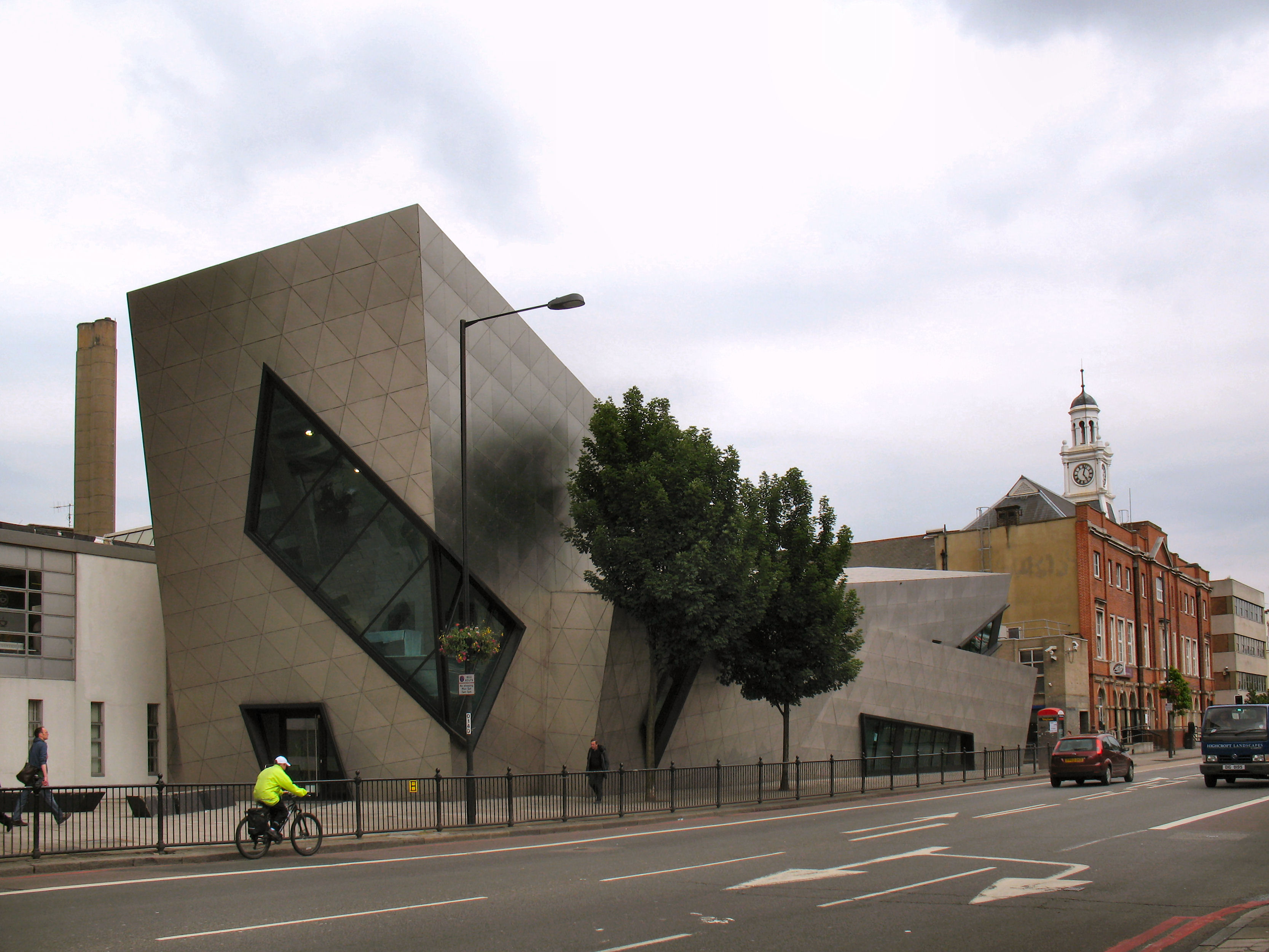
The Orion Building

Holloway Road is one of north London's shopping streets, containing major stores as well as numerous smaller shops. Holloway Road is the site of the main campus of the much-renamed London Metropolitan University (formerly Northern Polytechnic Institute, the Polytechnic of North London and University of North London), and includes the Orion Building, designed by Daniel Libeskind, which can be seen along the central stretch of Holloway Road, and of the headquarters of the National Union of Students and the Campaign for Nuclear Disarmament. Most of the shops are clustered in the Nag's Head area, near the junction with Seven Sisters Road. North of the Seven Sisters Road is the Nambucca pub and music venue, which burned down in 2008 and reopened two years later.

== Archway ==
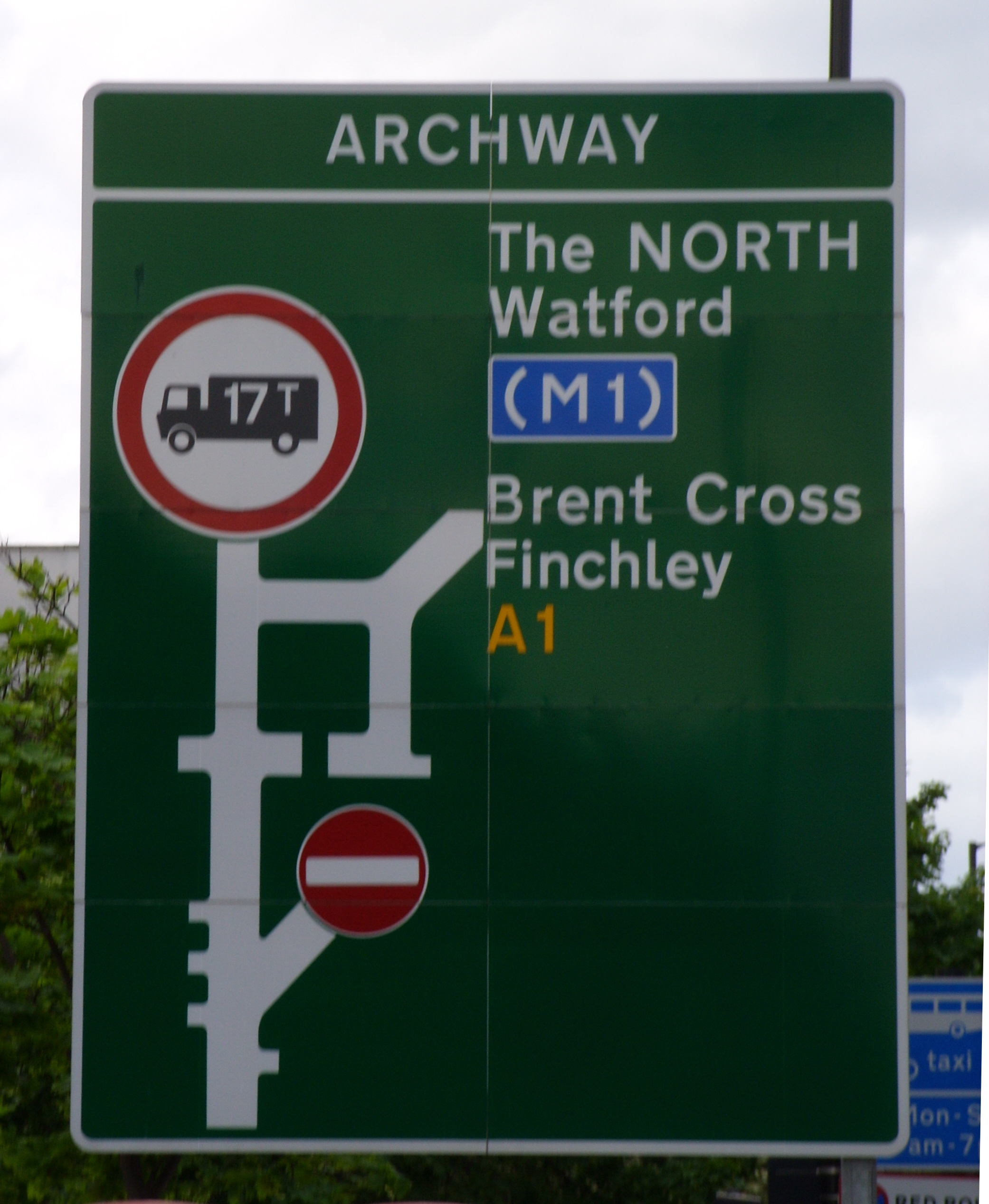
The complex junction at the Archway interchange

The northern point of Holloway Road is the complex interchange at Archway, where the A1 leaves the historic route of the Great North Road. The traditional Great North Road heads northwest up Highgate Hill (now the B519) before turning north at North Road, Highgate to cross the current A1 route. The A1 heads north along the relatively recently built Archway Road. The construction of the interchange left a few buildings isolated in the centre of the roundabout, including the Archway Tavern, which appears on the cover of The Kinks' 1971 album Muswell Hillbillies.

== Churches ==
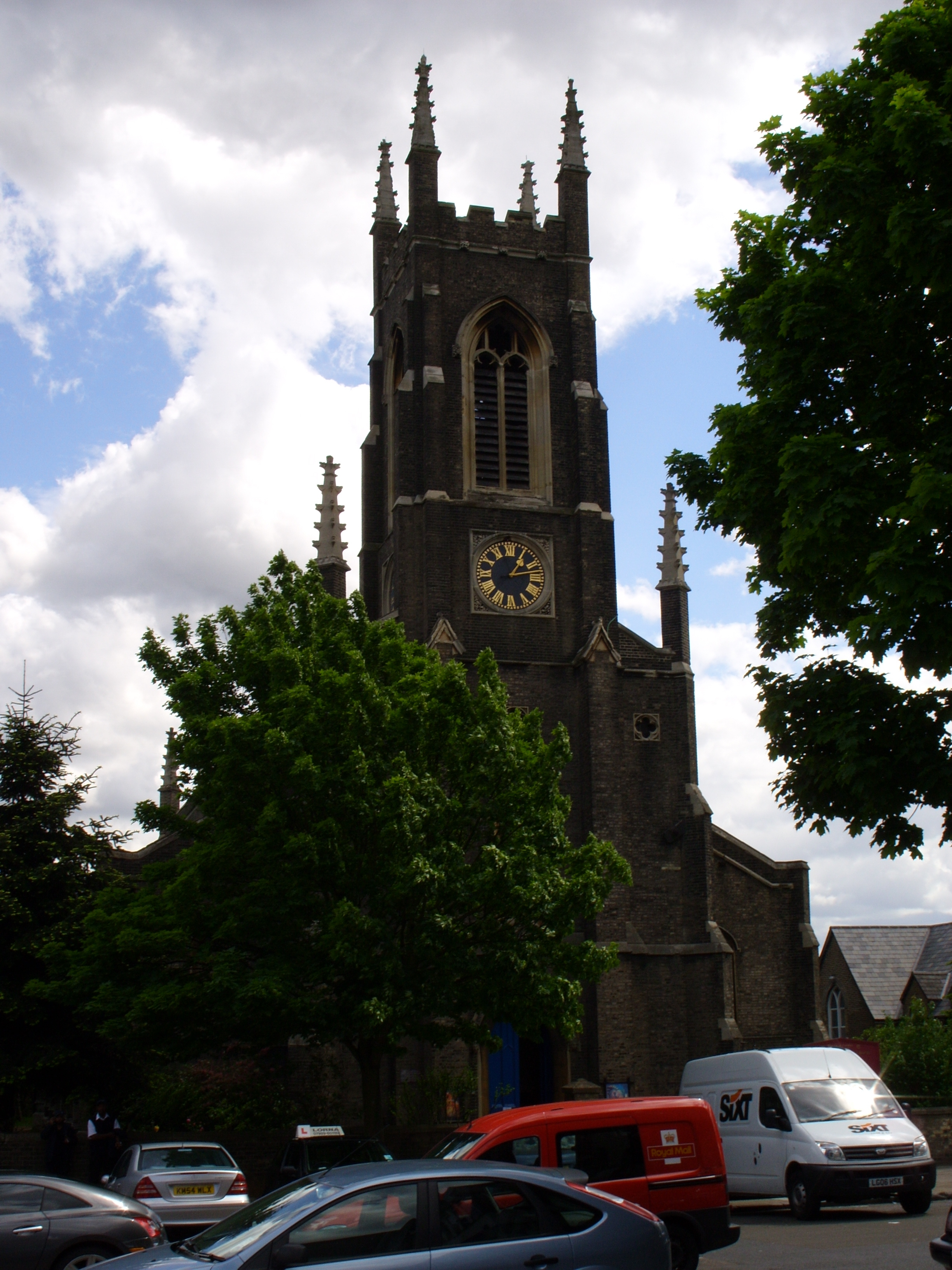
St John's Church, designed by Charles Barry Jr.

Holloway Road contains two significant London churches. St Mary Magdalene is situated in St Mary Magdalene Gardens near the southern end of the road. Built by William Wickings in 1814, it is one of the best preserved early 19th century churches in London. Charles Barry Jr.'s St John's Church is a leading example of Gothic Revival architecture and dominates the northern end of the road.

== Railway stations ==
As one of London's primary transport routes during the 19th century railway boom, Holloway Road contains a number of railway stations. Highbury Corner is the site of Highbury & Islington station, one of London's most important transport interchanges. The Victoria line, Northern City Line, and the London Overground North London line converge at this location. It is also the northern terminus of the London Overground East London line.

The station building was badly damaged by a V-1 flying bomb in 1944 and never rebuilt. The remainder of the building was demolished in 1966 in preparation for the construction of the Victoria line; the only surface building is a small entrance hall, set back from the main road.

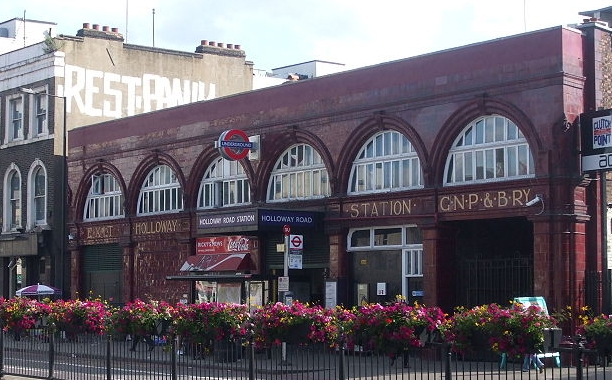
Holloway Road tube station

Holloway Road station opened with the Piccadilly line in 1906, next door to an existing Great Northern Railway main line station built in 1852. The main line station closed in 1915. Although Holloway Road is the nearest station to the Emirates Stadium, trains do not stop here on match days due to concerns about overcrowding.

Upper Holloway station was built in 1868 as part of the Tottenham & Hampstead Junction Railway. It is served by trains on the Gospel Oak to Barking line, which now forms part of the London Overground network.

Archway station is not actually situated on Holloway Road, but approximately 10 m off the main road on Junction Road, underneath the architecturally striking Archway Tower. Originally known as "Highgate", it was the original northern terminus of the Charing Cross, Euston & Hampstead Railway and until 1940 was the northern terminus of the Northern line.

== In popular culture ==
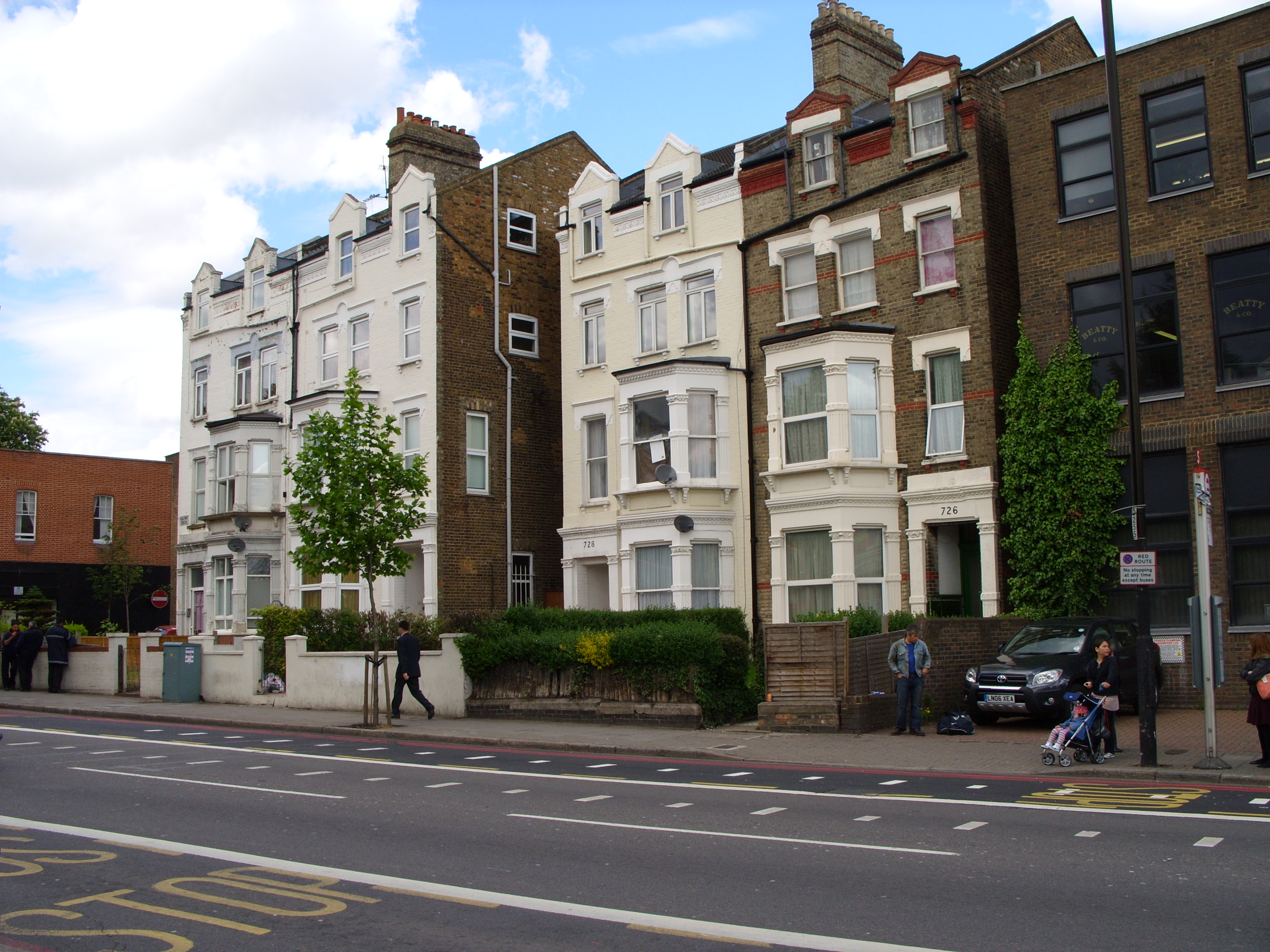
726–732 Holloway Road – the location of the fictional Brickfield Terrace in Diary of a Nobody

Record producer Joe Meek, responsible amongst other things for Telstar by The Tornados, a massive UK and US no. 1 record in 1962, and the highly influential 1959 album I Hear a New World, lived and worked at 304 Holloway Road, where, on 3 February 1967, he killed his landlady and then himself with a shotgun. His life is now commemorated by a plaque on the building.

Sex Pistols singer John Lydon (Johnny Rotten) claims to have been born and raised in side-street Benwell Road, although no documentary evidence survives of this.

The road features heavily as the home of a fictionalised Meek in Jake Arnott's The Long Firm trilogy.

The album Season End by Marillion includes "Holloway Girl", which refers to the imprisonment of Judith Ward in Holloway Prison.

A row of Victorian houses, numbers 726–732, opposite Upper Holloway station, stands at the described location of the fictional Brickfield Terrace in George and Weedon Grossmith's Diary of a Nobody. The architecture is typical for buildings on this stretch of the road.

Former pirate radio station Kiss FM based their studios and offices at 80 Holloway Road when they first launched as a legal radio station.
