= Archway, London =

Area of north London, England

Coordinates: 51.566°N 0.1338°W

Archway
- Area
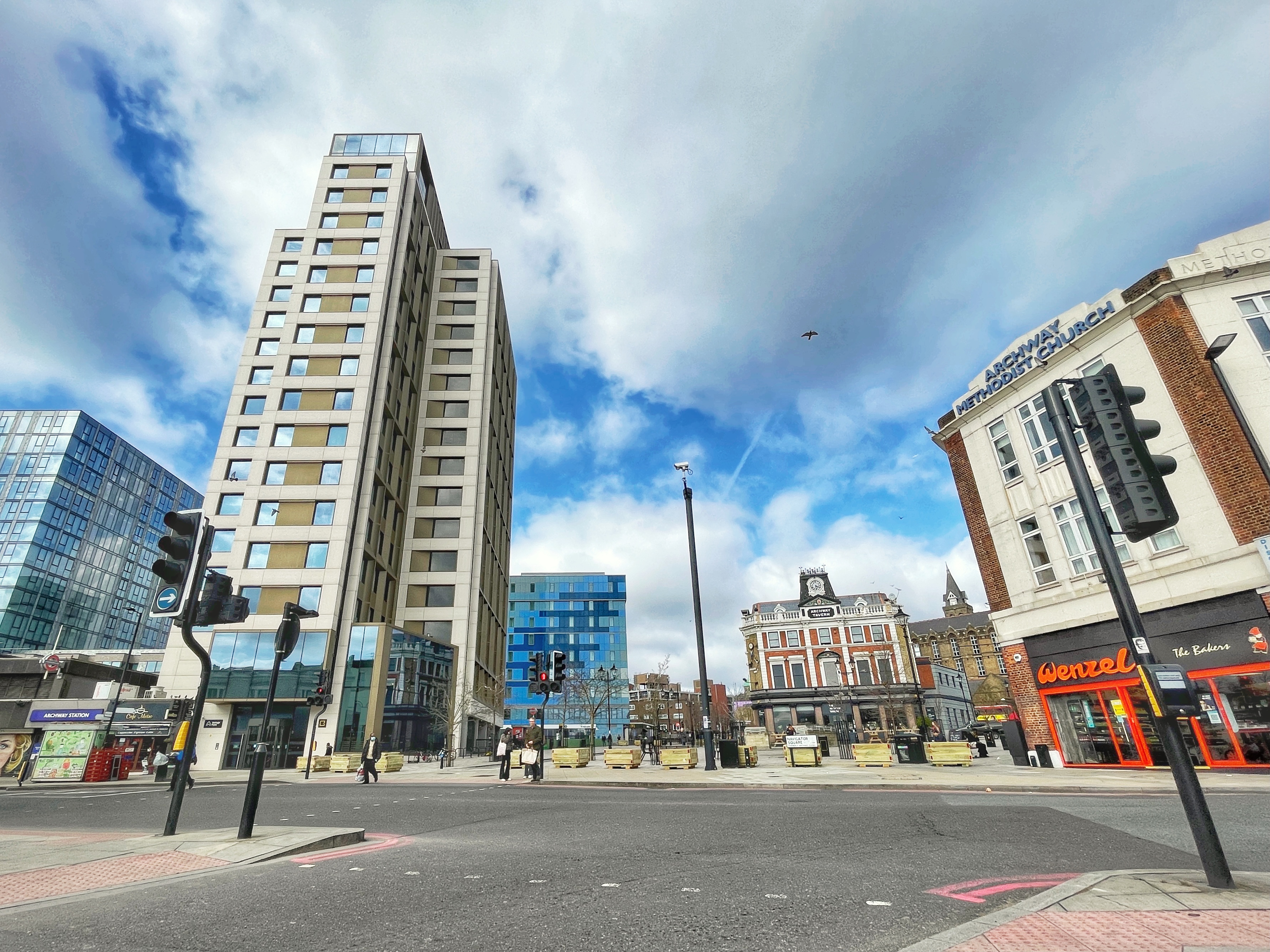
- Archway Navigator Square with Vantage Point, station, the Archway Tavern and Wenzel's bakery

- Location within Greater London
- OS grid reference: TQ285875
  - Charing Cross: 4 mi (6.4 km) N
- London borough: Islington
- Ceremonial county: Greater London
- Region: London
- Country: England
- Sovereign state: United Kingdom
- Post town: LONDON
- Postcode district: N19
- Dialling code: 020
- Police: Metropolitan
- Fire: London
- Ambulance: London
- UK Parliament: Islington North
- London Assembly: North East

Archway is an area of north London, England, in the London Borough of Islington 3.8 miles (6 km) north of Charing Cross. It straddles the A1 and its name is an early synonym for "tunnel", which is what the Highgate Archway Company set out to build. The tunnel collapsed during construction and was replaced by a structure comprising Highgate Archway (through which the new road passed) and a three-arch bridge above it carrying Hornsey Lane. This dual structure was replaced in 1900 by Archway Bridge. The area has a modern commercial hub around Vantage Point (formerly Archway Tower) and Archway tube station.

== History ==
=== Name ===
John Nash's Highgate Archway in the 1890s, looking towards central London. Nash's classical balustrade on Hornsey Lane had been replaced in 1885 by railings to stop suicides.

Archway's name reflects the original scheme for the construction of what is now Archway Road. This was built in 1810–13 to enable road users to avoid the 1:11 ascent of Highgate Hill. Instead, the road was to cut through the ridge to the east of Highgate in a tunnel, with the approaches in cuttings.

The first recorded use of the word "archway" was in 1802 in the proposal by the Northumbrian mining engineer Robert Vazie to establish a Thames Archway Company to build a tunnel under the Thames. The Oxford English Dictionary defines this sense as "An arched or vaulted passage". The proposal gathered support and the Thames Tunnel (Wapping and Rotherhithe) Act 1805 established the Company "for making and maintaining an Archway or Archways under the River Thames... ".

The Rotherhithe scheme failed, even after Richard Trevithick had been brought in to help. Undeterred, Vazie tried again at Highgate. In 1808 he proposed a tunnel more than a mile long which forked at the southern end to avoid both Highgate West Hill and Highgate Hill. After this failed to obtain Parliamentary sanction in 1809, he reduced the tunnel to 360 yards with approaches in cuttings; this passed as the St. Mary Islington Road Act 1810. It established the Highgate Archway Company "for making and maintaining a Road partly by an Archway through the East Side of Highgate Hill...". The Archway was to be 24' wide and 18' high.

=== Highgate Archway Company ===
Seal of the Highgate Archway Company

The Company's purpose – building a tunnel to avoid Highgate Hill – was given visible form on its seal. Its motto sicut talpæ sub terram vivimus means "like moles we live underground".

Work had been going on for several months when, in April 1811, with problems evident, John Rennie was consulted. He recommended reducing the tunnel to 211 yards. After a partial collapse he was consulted again in December 1811 and specified repairs using dowelled brickwork. After heavy rain, between 4 and 5 a.m. on 13 April 1812 the entire tunnel collapsed, fortunately without casualties.

The collapses and ensuing costs exhausted the Company's resources. It was obliged to seek a new Act of Parliament to increase its capital. The Highgate Archway Act 1812 increased the available capital to £70,000 but did not alter the Company's objects, which were to construct a tunnel and approach roads in cuttings.

Royal Mail coach passing through "Highgate Tunnel" on its way to London, 1830s aquatint

The Company responded to the collapse by appointing John Nash as engineer. He devised the scheme which was implemented. The entire route was excavated as a cutting and a structure built across it through which the road passed in an "archway" with Hornsey Lane carried across above.

Architecturally, these two were separate, with the "archway" having a well-defined top (the lintel), above which was the three-arched bridge for Hornsey Lane, at the former ground level. The "archway" was structurally a tunnel (see cross-section) with a ring of brickwork to resist thrusts from all directions. As the Highgate Archway Company was only authorised to build a tunnel (and cuttings on the approaches), that is what it was.

The Company always referred to the structure as "Archway" or "Highgate Archway", never "Archway Bridge". In some prints of the 1820s and 1830s it was described as "Highgate Tunnel". The concept of one road crossing another at a different level did not then exist: in 1898 Sir John Wolfe Barry cited "the famous Highgate Archway" and Holborn Viaduct as the only instances of grade separation in London, apart from roads at river-bank level beneath bridges over the Thames.

The scheme opened on 21 August 1813 but, being in a deep cutting, the road surface was plagued by frequent and sudden inundations. All attempts to form a firm roadway were unsuccessful until 1829 when Telford's chief engineer John Macneill laid the road metal in a thick bed of Roman cement with extensive drainage at the sides.

At first, the toll gate was in the Archway; the windows lighting the toll-keeper's room can be seen in the print of Highgate Tunnel, along with a bricked-up door and hatch below. (Note: As well as the room within the Archway, there were exits which enabled the toll keeper to come out to carriages (in each direction) which had stopped at the gate; see https://www.londonpicturearchive.org.uk/zoom-item?i=303423&WINID=1789544127589. In the late nineteenth century these were reopened for pedestrians to use; see plan at https://www.londonpicturearchive.org.uk/zoom-item?i=303411&WINID=1791283042202) By 1817 the toll gate had been moved south, next to the newly-built Archway Tavern (Note: The Archway Tavern was built on the garden of the first house on Highgate Hill; see A.C.Pugin's 1812 "View of the Highgate Archway", https://www.londonpicturearchive.org.uk/zoom-item?i=29184&WINID=1789544127589.). It remained in use until 1864. A plaque at 1 Pauntley Street, an apartment block, records this.

Demolition of Nash's Highgate Archway in 1900

In the later nineteenth century, houses were built beside Archway Road, changing perceptions of where the ground level lay and giving the Archway the appearance of a bridge. Nash's structure was replaced in 1900 by the current steel Hornsey Lane Bridge with cast- and wrought-iron decorations. A few residents, especially those born and locally raised in the early 20th century, refer to the area with a definite article (as "the Archway").

=== Development ===
Seven bus routes in London terminate at 'Archway', the term having become mainstream after the tube station, originally called Highgate, was renamed Highgate (Archway) in 1939, and subsequently Archway (Highgate) in 1941, and Archway in 1947. The ecclesiastical parishes (once having had poor-relief vestries employing highwaymen, for example) before the laws that disestablished their secular components do not mention Archway. Those covering the area are parts of traditional parent parishes named Whitehall Park, Upper Holloway, St John the Evangelist, Upper Holloway and a very small part of a Highgate, Islington parish.

Highgate Hill, the road from Archway to Highgate village, was the route of the first motorised cable tramway in Europe. It operated from 1884 to 1909. Highgate tube station (later renamed 'Highgate Archway' and subsequently just 'Archway') opened on 22 June 1907 as the northern terminus of the Highgate branch of the Northern Line.

=== Local government ===
The ancient parish of Islington stretched over three miles from its southern boundary to meet with the parish of Hornsey at its north. The area that became Archway is located at the northwestern part of this parish. The parish was government by the St Mary Islington open vestry. The vestry was incorporated by the Metropolis Management Act 1855 as an administrative vestry and the boundary with Hornsey to the north also became the northern limit of the London metropolitan district.

== Governance ==
Archway is part of the Islington North Parliament constituency. It is mostly in the Islington ward of Junction, which is named after Junction Road and partly in the ward of Hillrise. Each ward elects three councillors to Islington London Borough Council.

== Demographics ==
Archway has seen a significant shift in demographics through waves of migration and gentrification, and has a diverse population with a proportionally larger White British, Irish, Other White and Jewish populations compared to the London and Islington averages.

The demographics of the two wards which Archway falls (predominantly in) are as follows:

Ethnic Group	Junction Ward	Hillrise Ward
White British	48.1%	46.6%
White Irish	5.8%	5.1%
White Other	15.5%	14.5%
Black African	5.3%	6.7%
Black Caribbean	4.1%	5.5%
Black Other	2.1%	3.2%
Indian	1.8%	1.4%
Chinese	2.0%	0.9%
Mixed	7.2%	7.6%
Other	8.1%	8.5

Religion	Junction Ward	Hillrise Ward
Christian	40.2%	41.5%
Muslim	7.6%	9.6%
Judaism	1.4%	1.6%
Other	3.3%	2.5%
Not stated	16.6%	16.4%
None	30.9%	28.4%

The Archway area has the highest percentages of Jews in Islington - at the 2021 Census the Archway East area was 2.9% Jewish, Archway West was 1.6% and Tufnell Park 2.8%. The community is largest in the Whitehall Park area (between Archway, Highgate and Crouch End) which is close to 10% Jewish.

The Junction ward has the 4th highest percentage of White Irish people in wards in London.

== Geography ==
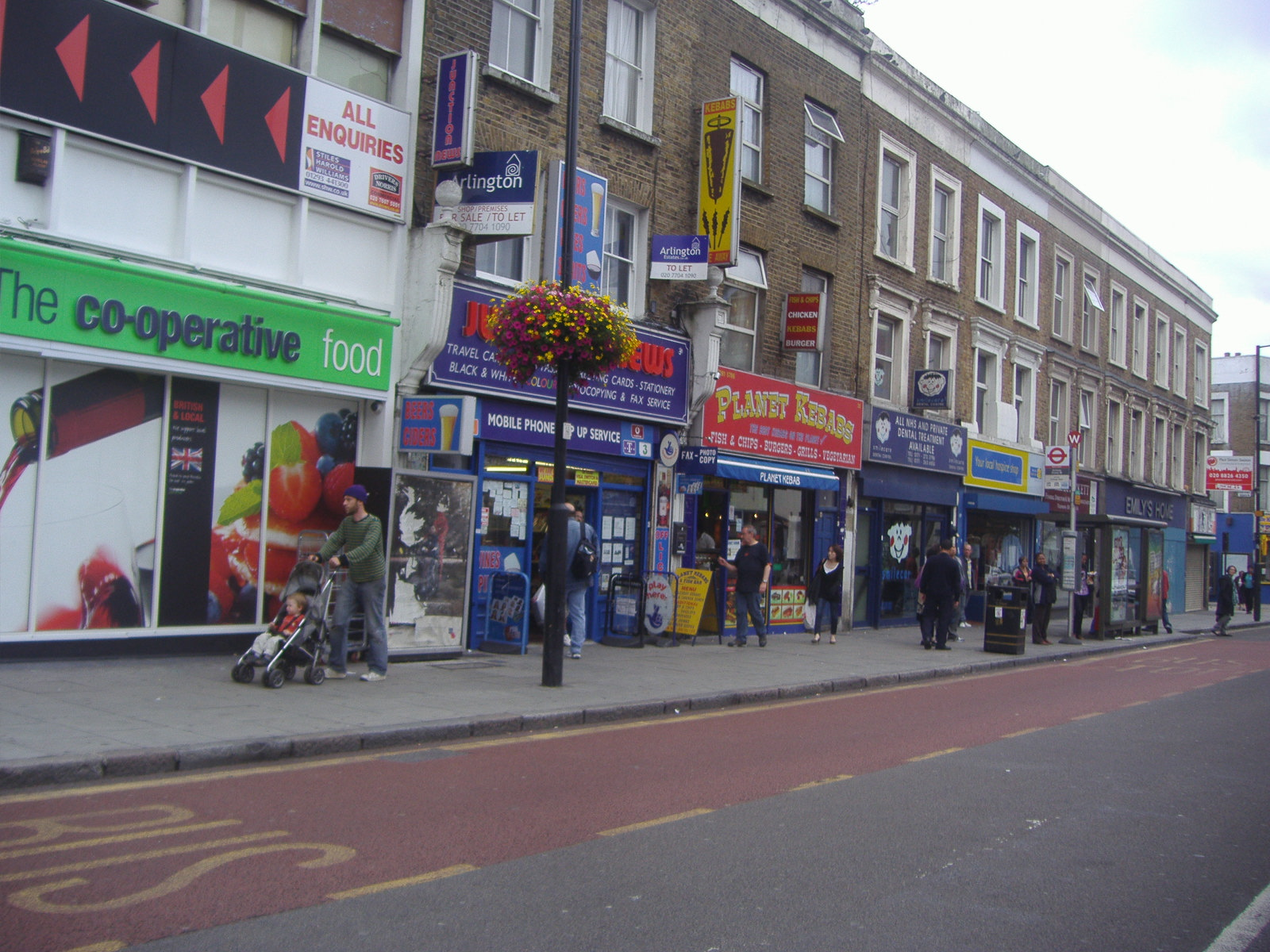
Shops in Junction Road, Archway

The Whittington Hospital forms a large site in the west of the area. Larger open spaces include Archway Park, Dartmouth Park, Hillside Park and Navigator Square. Archway forms part of the London post town within the N19 postcode district, served from the Royal Mail Upper Holloway Delivery Office.

Archway adjoins Highgate and Crouch End to the north, with Hornsey Lane forming the London Borough of Islington boundary with the London Borough of Haringey. In the west, is Dartmouth Park, with Dartmouth Park Hill forming the boundary with the London Borough of Camden. To the west of the point where the three boroughs meet at the top of Highgate Hill is Waterlow Park. South of Archway is Upper Holloway and Tufnell Park.

=== Commercial ===
Archway market place and Vantage Point, the tallest building in Archway, are next to the tube station.

The photograph for the cover of The Kinks' 1971 album Muswell Hillbillies was taken in the Archway Tavern.

== Services ==
=== Library ===
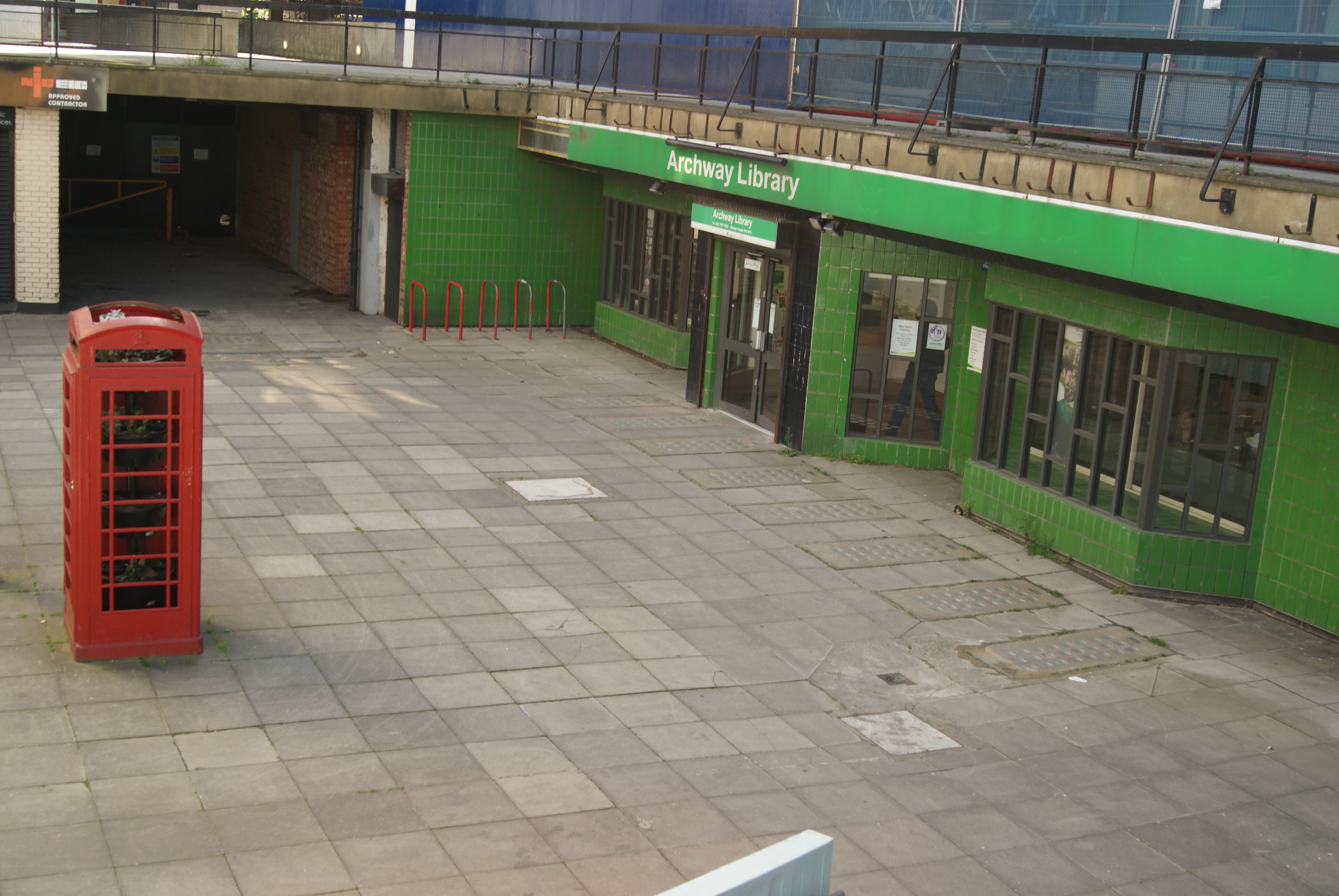
The library in 2015

Archway library originally opened in 1946, with a redevelopment completed in 1980. It is one of the most popular libraries in the Islington public libraries service, with nearly 100,000 visits in 2024/25.

The proposed Vorley Road redevelopment would see the creation of a larger, brighter space.

== Transport ==
=== Rail and Underground ===
The nearest London Underground station is Archway tube station on the Northern line. The nearest London Overground station is Upper Holloway.

=== Bus routes ===
Archway is served by the following bus routes: 4, 17, 41, 43 (24 hour), 134 (24 hour), 143, 210, 263, 310, 390 (24 hour), C11 and W5. Also Night Bus routes N20, N41 and N263.

== Culture ==
=== Dick Whittington ===
A legend perpetuated by the name of the hospital and a statue on the older street leading, beside the hospital, to Highgate records Dick Whittington, medieval Mayor of London, failing to make his fortune in the city heard the Bow Bells (those of St Mary-le-Bow, a church on Cheapside) from here, a distance of 4.5 miles (7.2 km) leading to the later homage "turn again Whittington, thrice Lord Mayor of London", inscribed on the supporting stone protected by railings. On top of the thick tablet, his cat of English folklore is cast in stone. A restored 1821 memorial stone topped with a small statue of Whittington's Cat is known as the Whittington Stone and is next to a pub of the same name on Highgate Hill, a street in Archway. The memorial marks the legendary site where 'Dick Whittington' Sir Richard's folkloric alter ego, returning home discouraged after a disastrous attempt to make his fortune in the city, heard the bells of St Mary le Bow ring out, 'Turn again Whittington, thrice Lord Mayor of London.' Seeing the building of a maternity hospital and drains for the poor of London during his lifetime, he left his wealth to a broad-based charity which continues into the 21st century. Pauntley Street takes its name from the village of Pauntley in the Forest of Dean, Gloucestershire, traditionally regarded as Dick Whittington's birthplace. The Whittington Hospital is also named after him.

=== Irish population ===
There has been a large Irish community in the area since the 1830s, before the mass migration of the Great Famine. Many of them worked in building railways and roads and became known as "navigators". After the Second World War, the Irish community formed in the area continued to grow as the newly opened Whittington Hospital recruited nurses from Ireland. Although immigration slowed as the country became more prosperous, the Irish influence on the area can still be seen in pubs such as The Mother Red Cap, the supply of Irish newspapers in local newsagents and the naming of the pedestrian precinct as Navigator Square, after the Irish navigators who built many of the roads in the area.

== See also ==
- List of people from Islington
- List of bridges in London
- The Bomb Factory Art Foundation
