= Whittington Park =

Park in Upper Holloway, London, England

Coordinates: 51.562°N 0.129°W

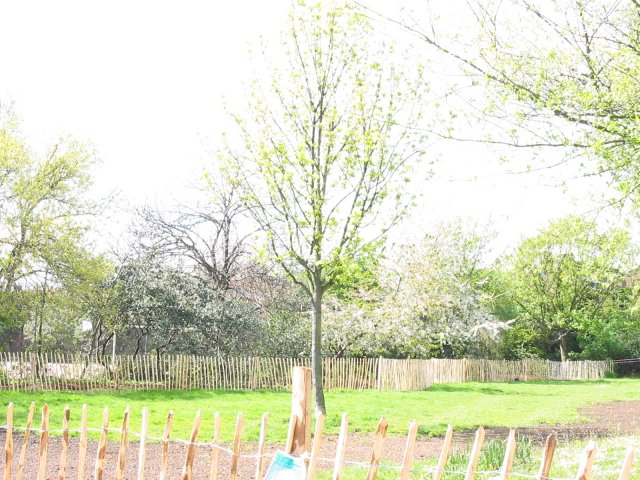
Whittington Park

Whittington Park is a public park in Upper Holloway, North London. Like the nearby Whittington Hospital, it is named after Dick Whittington, and a large topiary cat, in reference to Whittington's legendary pet, stands at the Holloway Road entrance. Amenities include a raised Astroturf football pitch, children's playground, and experimental garden planted as part of an RSPB initiative to investigate the preferred habitat of house sparrows. In 2009 and 2010, renovations were carried out at Whittington Park, including the construction of a new community centre.
