= Archway tube station =

London Underground station

Archway
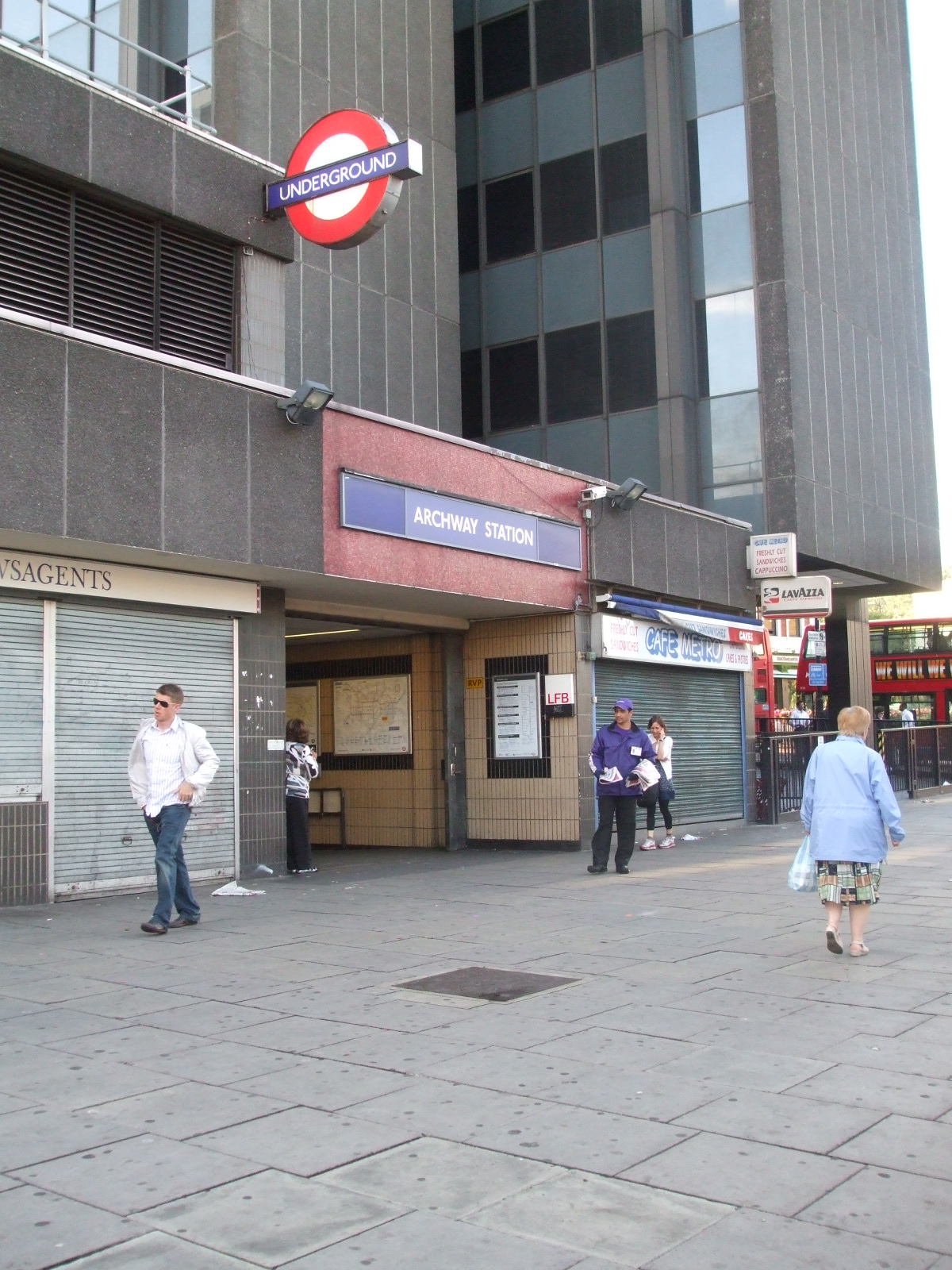
- Main entrance on Junction Road
- Interactive map of Archway

General information
- Location: Archway
- Local authority: London Borough of Islington
- Managed by: London Underground
- Number of platforms: 2
- Fare zone: 2 and 3
- OSI: Upper Holloway

London Underground annual entry and exit
- 2021: ▼4.03 million
- 2022: ▲6.80 million
- 2023: ▲7.14 million
- 2024: ▼7.03 million
- 2025: ▼6.78 million

Railway companies
- Original company: Charing Cross, Euston and Hampstead Railway

Key dates
- 22 June 1907: Opened as Highgate; terminus of line
- 11 June 1939: Renamed Archway (Highgate)
- 3 July 1939: Line extended to East Finchley
- 19 January 1941: Renamed Highgate (Archway)
- December 1947: Renamed Archway

Other information
- External links: TfL station info page
- Coordinates: 51.56556°N 0.13500°W

Archway is a London Underground station. It is located at the intersection of Holloway Road, Highgate Hill, Junction Road and Archway Road in Archway, North London, directly underneath the Vantage Point building. The station is on the High Barnet branch of the Northern line, between Highgate and Tufnell Park stations. It is in both London fare zone 2 and zone 3.

== Location ==
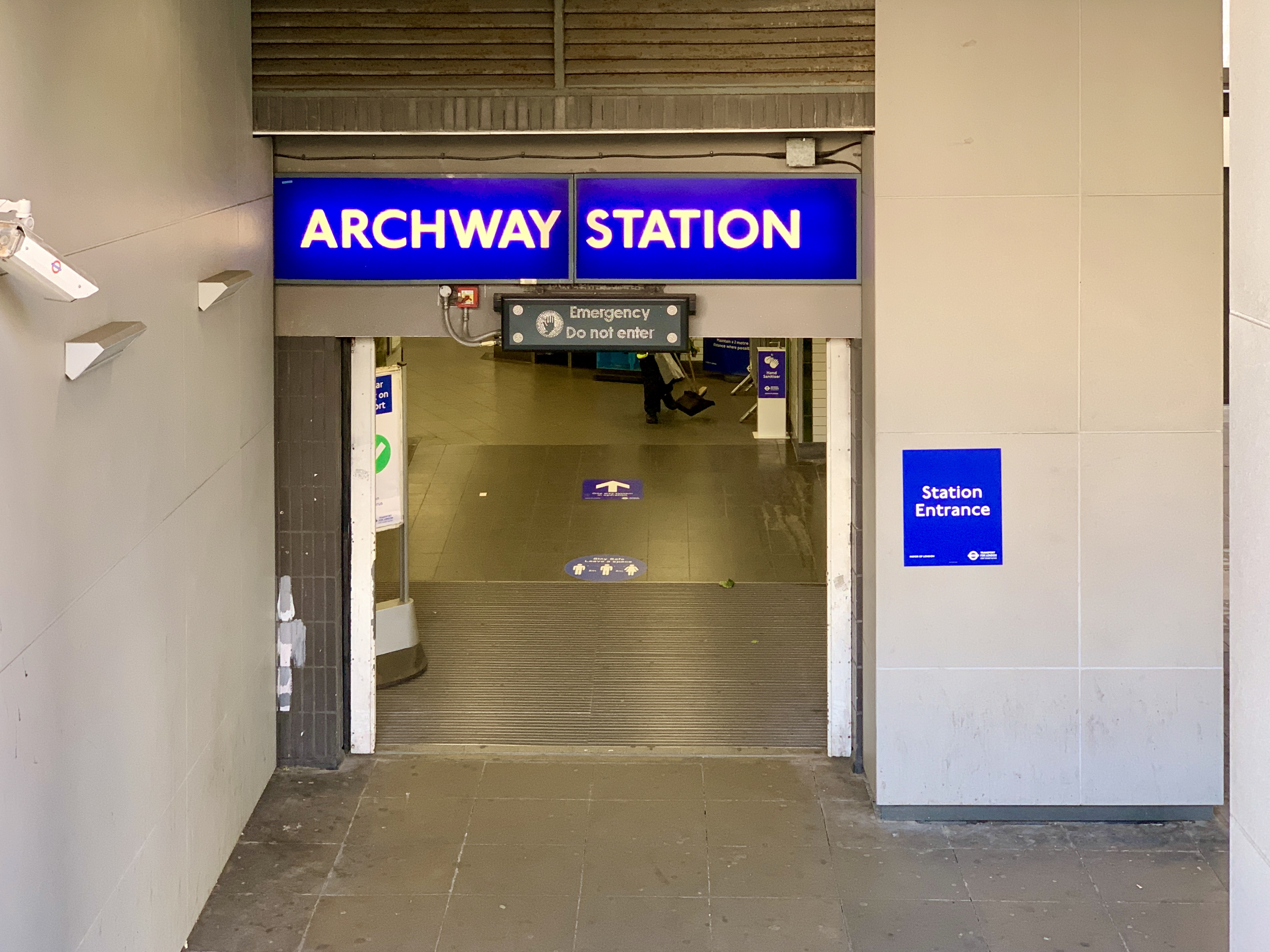
Side entrance on Highgate Hill.

When constructed, the area was simply the northern end of Holloway Road and had no specific name but, in the hope of attracting patronage, the terminus was originally named Highgate after the village up the hill. At the time of the station's construction the first cable tramway in Europe operated non-stop up Highgate Hill to the village from outside the Archway Tavern, and this name was also considered for the station. The main station entrance now lies beneath Archway Tower (now renamed Vantage Point) on Junction Road while the side entrance is on Highgate Hill.

== History ==
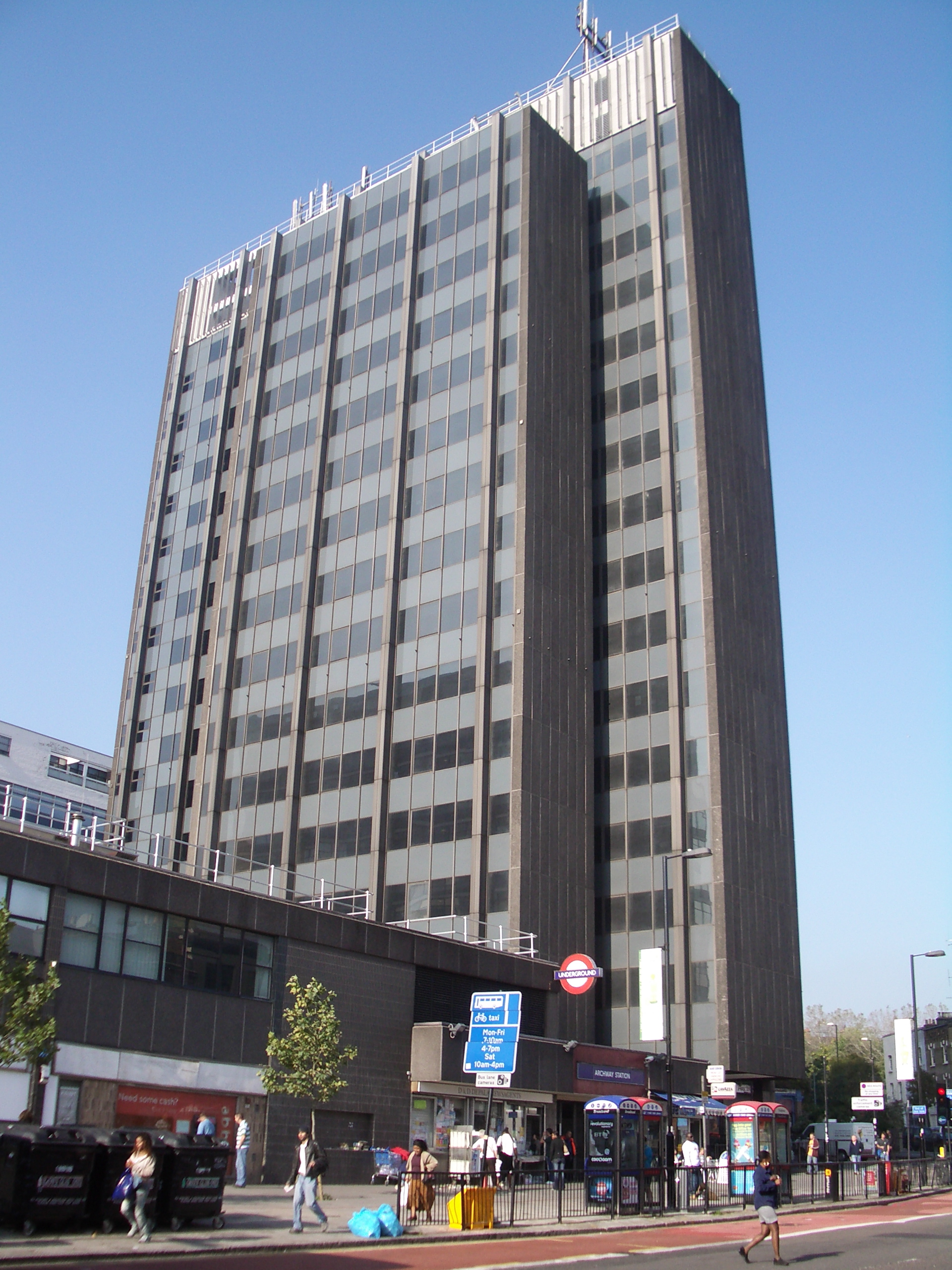
The station lies at the base of Archway Tower, viewed from Junction Road.

The Leslie Green designed station opened on 22 June 1907, under the name Highgate faced in Green's standard ox-blood glazed brick. It was opened as one of the northern terminals of what was then the Charing Cross, Euston & Hampstead Railway (CCE&HR).

The station was renamed Archway (Highgate) on 11 June 1939 (after the nearby road bridge over the deep cutting containing Archway Road). On 3 July 1939, the line was extended to the Great Northern Railway's station at Highgate and East Finchley station as part of the New Works Programme. The station was renamed Highgate (Archway) on 19 January 1941, before becoming just Archway in December 1947 with the Highgate name being reassigned to the new station constructed beneath the London and North Eastern Railway (LNER) high-level station of the same name.

On 2 June 2006, a train derailed while entering the reversing siding at the station.

In 2007 plans to add step-free access to the station were consulted on and a Transport and Works Act Order was granted. These plans were subsequently shelved by incoming mayor Boris Johnson.

== Design ==
In 1930 the station was upgraded with escalators to replace the original lifts and the secondary entrance was replaced with a modern design by Charles Holden, virtually identical to the one he built at the same time at Hammersmith. Holden's station was replaced in the 1970s.

The platform walls once featured the distinctive and elegantly simple tiling schemes used by Holden on the underground stations constructed at this time. Cream tiles were used throughout with the station name band formed of letter shaped tiles inset into a background of cream tiles incised to accept the lettering. Similar tiling schemes can be seen at the neighbouring Highgate station, as well as at Bethnal Green and the stations on the tunnelled section of the Hainault branch of the Central line (for example Gants Hill). All were built in the late 1930s/early 1940s. The tiles at Archway were replaced several years ago during retiling works.

As of 2015, the station has escalators descending to the platforms. Alternatively, passengers can use the 113 steps to get down to the platforms.

An unusual feature for a Northern line station is that both platforms are long enough to accommodate nine car trains instead of the usual seven. This was an early attempt to solve overcrowding on the line. For many years after Archway opened the last two cars of each train were reserved exclusively for passengers travelling between Archway and Tottenham Court Road. At all other stations the last two cars remained in the running tunnel at each stop so that passengers using them had an uninterrupted journey. At Tottenham Court Road, the train stopped beyond the station such that the first two cars entered the running tunnel beyond the station allowing the passengers in the rear seven cars to embark or disembark. A consequence of this arrangement was: that the front two cars could not be used by passengers intending to disembark at Tottenham Court Road from either direction. The rear two cars ran empty south of Tottenham Court Road (Archway being the northern terminus at the time).

Following the success of this nine car arrangement, nine car operation was implemented between Kennington and Edgware, but with only a limited number of stations being accessible from the rear two cars. These were Kennington to Leicester Square inclusive and Golders Green to Colindale inclusive. Nine car trains did not stop at Mornington Crescent but this was because, at this time, all Edgeware trains did not stop there. Stations south of Tottenham Court Road operated with two cars in running tunnel. However, north of Hampstead, the stations were converted for nine car platforms as the stations are not in tunnel. The service was eventually extended to Edgware, but site constraints meant that only seven and a half cars could be accommodated on platform 1 only so either Edgware was a non nine car station or passengers were allowed to disembark via the communicating doors.

All nine car operation was suspended on 6 September 1939 when the line was split into two sections for the installation of flood gates just after World War II was declared. It was never reinstated.

== Crossover and siding ==
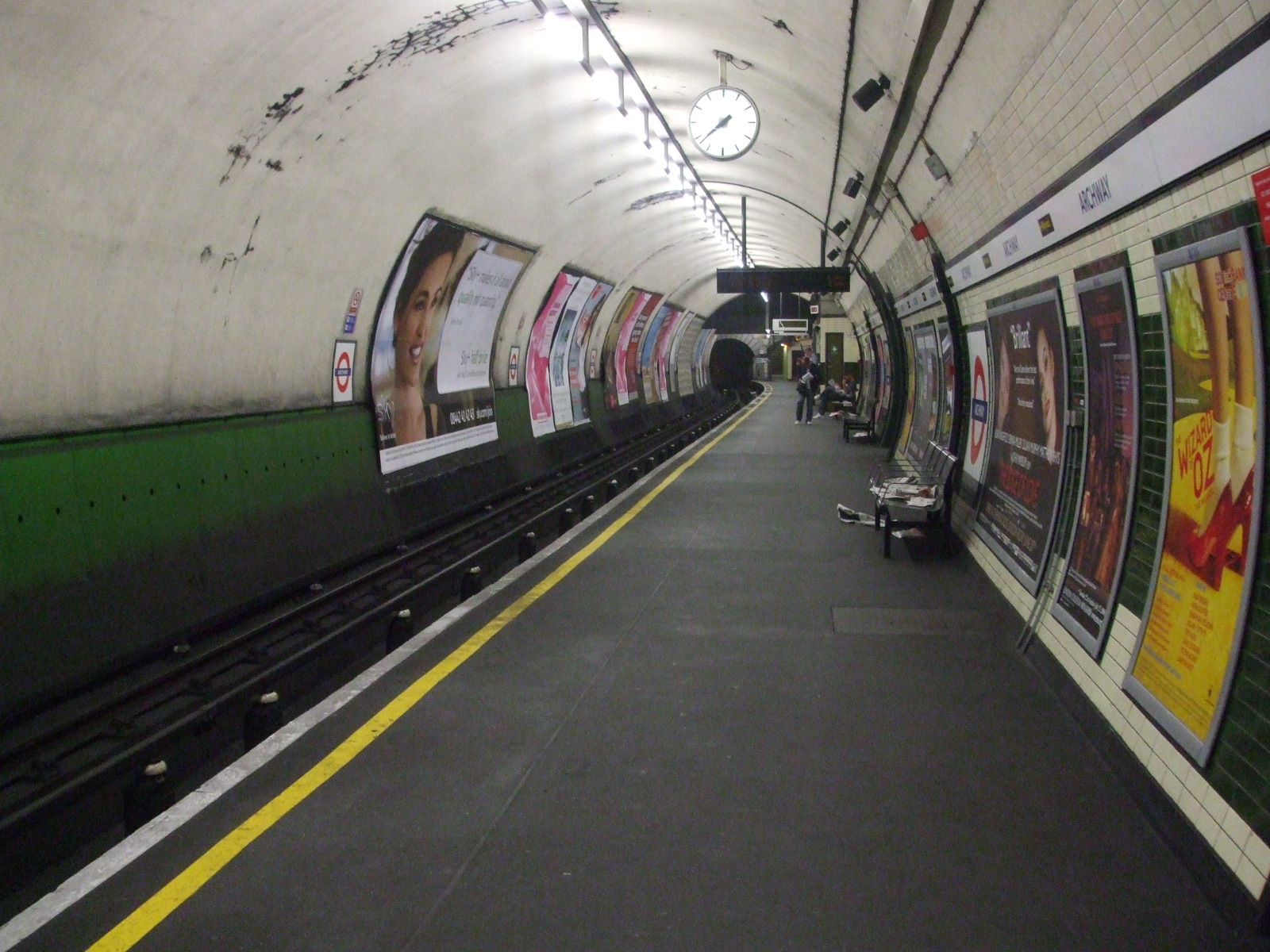
Northbound platform looking north. The small width of the platform together with the southbound one reflect the station's former role as a terminus.

When the original section of the Northern Line from Charing Cross to Golders Green and Archway (then Highgate) was opened in 1907, the terminus at Archway was provided with a scissors crossover just south of the station and the running lines beyond the north end of the platforms continued as separate dead-end sidings. When the line was extended to Highgate and East Finchley in 1939, the 'northbound' siding was extended as the northbound road while the 'southbound' siding was retained as a dead-end siding, extended at the north end with the new southbound line from Highgate joining it just before the southbound platform and a new connection from the northbound line to the siding, thus turning the old 'southbound' siding into a central reversing siding. The crossover south of the station was subsequently converted to a single trailing crossover but was decommissioned on 15 October 1967, when Archway was converted to programme-machine control from Cobourg Street. The signal box closed on 25 June 1961 when Archway became remote-controlled. (Note: It was situated at the south end of the southbound platform and is now a relay room.)

The enlarged crossover tunnel remains although cable runs extend down its centre between the two tracks for most of its length. (Note: Also of note is a surviving limit of shunt board for 7-car trains, a square white enamel plate with a black 7, on the right-hand tunnel wall of the southbound road south of the crossover that trains pulled up to in order to reverse northwards.) The layout of the platforms and the underground passenger areas still reflect the station's former role as a terminus.

== Services ==
Archway station is on the High Barnet branch of the Northern line in London fare zones 2 and 3. It is between Highgate to the north and Tufnell Park to the south. Trains generally operate between Morden or Battersea Power Station to High Barnet or Mill Hill East via the Charing Cross or the Bank branch. Occasionally and during disruptions or engineering works, trains can terminate at Archway. Train frequencies vary throughout the day, but generally operate every 3–7 minutes between 05:58 and 00:19 in both directions.

== Connections ==
- London Buses day and nighttime routes serve the station.
- London Underground maps and maps in London Overground trains show the station as 450 m from Upper Holloway station on the Gospel Oak to Barking line. Interchange within 20 minutes is allowed between the two stations.

== Notes and references ==
=== References ===
Preceding station	London Underground	Following station
Highgate towards High Barnet or Mill Hill East	Northern line High Barnet branch	Tufnell Park towards Battersea Power Station, Morden or Kennington
