= Rachel Ara =

British conceptual and data artist

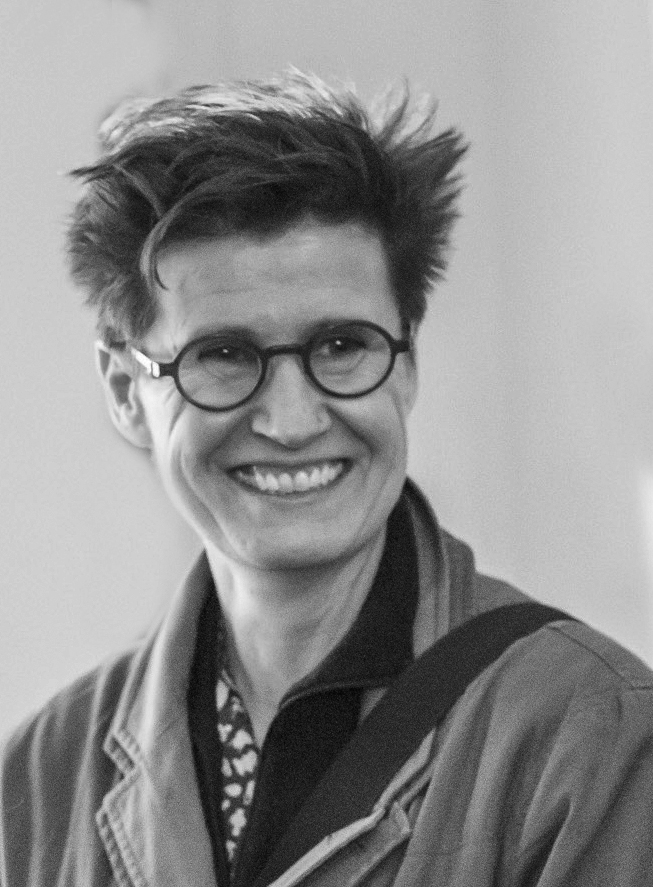
- Rachel Ara at the Courtauld Institute of Art (2018)
- Born: 1965 (age 60–61); Jersey, Channel Islands
- Education: Goldsmiths, University of London
- Known for: Conceptual art, Data art, Digital art, Contemporary art
- Notable work: This Much I'm Worth
- Awards: Burston award; Lumen Prize artist; Aesthetica Art Prize (2016)
- Website: www.2ra.co

Rachel Ara (born 1965, Jersey) is a London-based contemporary British conceptual and data artist.

== Overview ==
Ara was originally a computer programmer. She then studied for a Fine Art BA degree at Goldsmiths, University of London.

Ara is an elected Academician of the Royal West of England Academy. She is also a member of the Royal Society of Sculptors.

Rachel Ara has exhibited in the Barbican Centre, Whitechapel Gallery, Mall Galleries, The Bomb Factory Art Foundation, and the Victoria and Albert Museum in London, UK. Internationally, her works have been exhibited at the National Museum of Modern and Contemporary Art in Seoul, South Korea, and the Museum of Applied Arts in Vienna, Austria. She has an interest in data protection with respect to her works. In a 2019 interview with Vanessa Murrell from DATEAGLE ART, Ara quoted “you can’t make subtle artwork and survive”. She gives talks on her work, including at the London Design Festival.

== Education ==
Ara studied BA(Hons) Fine Art at Goldsmiths where she won the Neville Burston Award for the most outstanding student.

== Selected exhibitions ==
- Vertiginous Data, National Museum of Modern and Contemporary Art (MMCA), Seoul, South Korea (23 March – 28 July 2019)
- Uncanny Values – Artificial Intelligence and You, Vienna Biennale 2019, The Mak, Vienna, Austria (29 May – 6 October 2019)
- Event Two, Royal College of Art, London, UK (12–17 July 2019)
- London Design Week, V&A, London, UK (14–22 October 2019)

== Works in collections ==
Ara's work has featured at the Victoria and Albert Museum, London, including mixed reality nuns as a V&A VARI Artist in Residence.
