= List of people from the London Borough of Islington =

The following is a list of those who were born in the London Borough of Islington, or have dwelt within the borders of the modern borough (in alphabetical order):

- Adebayo Akinfewa (born 1982), English footballer
- Terence Alexander (born 1923-2009), actor
- Jonny Buckland (born 1977), guitarist and songwriter, born in Islington and raised in Pantymwyn, Wales
- Pete Byrne (1952-2026), lead singer of Naked Eyes
- Caroline Chisholm (1808–1877), lived at 32 Charlton Place
- Daisy Edgar-Jones (born 1998), British actor, critically acclaimed for work in Normal People, Where the Crawdads Sing, Twisters, and Under the Banner of Heaven
- Colin Firth (born 1960), actor
- Princess Märtha Louise of Norway (born 1971), who lived in Islington from 2012 to 2014
- Noah Jupe (born 2005), actor best-known for his work in the post-apocalyptic monster horror film A Quiet Place (2018), the drama film Honey Boy (2019) and the psychological thriller miniseries The Undoing (2020).
- Eddie Linden (1935–2023), Scottish poet and editor, lived in Archway in the early 1960s
- Mariah May (born 1998), English pro wrestler.
- Ivor Moreton (1908–1984), pianist and singer, born in Barnsbury
- Andrew Ng, co-founder of education technology company Coursera, director of Stanford University's Artificial Intelligence Lab
- David Oyelowo (born 1976), actor, grew up in Islington, attended City and Islington College
- Jacob Post (1774–1855), religious writer
- Joey Pyle (1937–2007), gangland boss, born in The Angel
- Francis Ronalds (1788–1873), inventor of electric telegraph, lived in Canonbury, then Highbury Terrace, from 1789 to 1813
- Alfred Ronalds (1802–1860), fly fishing author, born at 1 Highbury Terrace in 1802
- Emma Watson (born 1990), grew up in Islington for a period of time
- Kenneth Williams (1926–1988), actor and comedian, born at 11 Bingfield Street, lived in Cromer Street
- Edgar Wright (born 1974), film director
- Elizabeth Anne Le Noir (1755-1841) poet, novelist, and feminist, born and raised in Islington

== See also ==
- Islington prisons – for a listing of persons imprisoned at the HM Prison Pentonville
