= London Buses route 4 =

London bus route

4
- Metroline Wright StreetDeck Electroliner in Holloway in September 2026

Overview
- Operator: Metroline
- Garage: Holloway
- Predecessors: Route 4A

Route
- Start: Archway station
- Via: Holloway; Finsbury Park; Islington; Barbican; St Paul's Cathedral
- End: Blackfriars station

Service
- Level: Daily

London Buses route 4 is a Transport for London contracted bus route in London, England. Running between Archway and Blackfriars stations, it is operated by Metroline.

== History ==
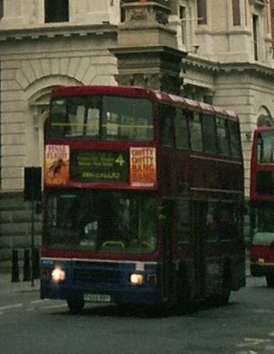
A Metroline Volvo Olympian double-decker on route 43 on the Strand, 2005

On 25 September 1993, the contract for route 4 was won by London Suburban Bus, who operated the route with Leyland Titans.

On 27 April 1995, route 4 was included in the sale of London Suburban Bus to Metroline and in March 2000 to ComfortDelGro.

In April 2019, Transport for London announced that route 4 would be withdrawn between Waterloo station and St Paul's station and extended to Blackfriars station via Queen Victoria Street instead, with the change taking effect in June of that year.

== Current route ==
Route 4 operates via these primary locations:

- Archway station
- Whittington Hospital
- Tufnell Park station
- Holloway Nag's Head
- Finsbury Park station
- Highbury
- Islington
- Angel station
- Barbican station
- St Paul's station
- Blackfriars station
