= St Mary Magdalene Church, Holloway Road =

Coordinates: 51°32′54″N 0°6′29″W

- Hope Church Islington
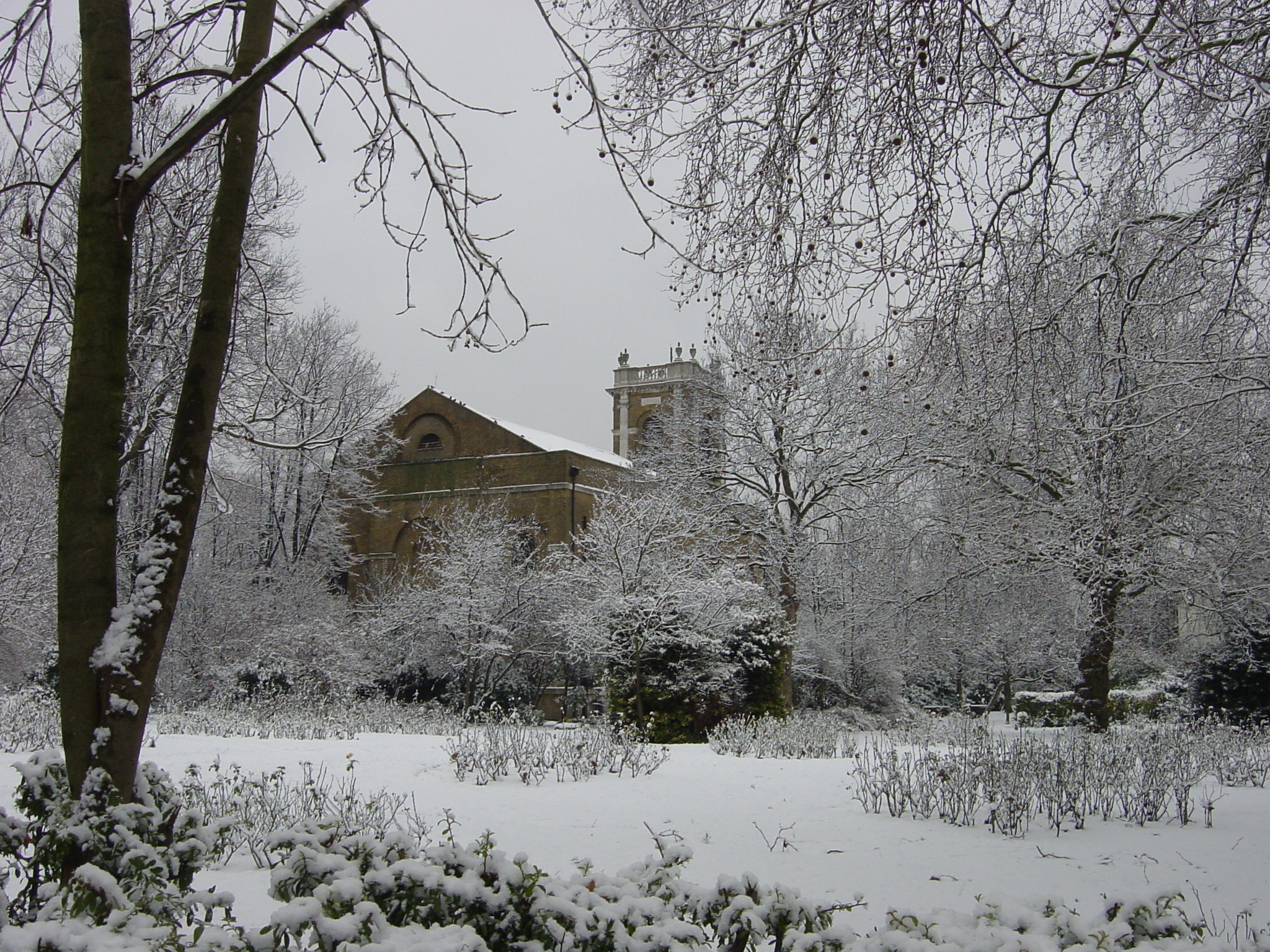

- Location within Greater London
- OS grid reference: TQ 31288 84971
- Location: Holloway Road, Islington, N7 8LT, London
- Country: England
- Denomination: Church of England
- Churchmanship: Low Church

Architecture
- Architect: William Wickings
- Years built: 1814

Administration
- Division: Islington Deanery
- Diocese: London (Stepney Area)
- Parish: St Mary Magdalene & St David

Clergy
- Priest: Reverend James Hughesdon (Vicar) Reverend Sonia Home (Associate Vicar)

St Mary Magdalene Church is one of Hope Church Islington's places of worship, an Anglican church on Holloway Road in north London dedicated to Jesus' companion Mary Magdalene. It is located in St Mary Magdalene Gardens opposite Islington Central Library. St Mary Magdalene is part of the Parish of Hope Church Islington (previously the Parish of St Mary Magdalene and St David). In 2013 its sister church St David's on Westbourne road was reopened. Baptisms and confirmations, marriages and funerals are regularly held here. The building and its iron railings are both Grade II* listed structures, having first been listed in 1954.

== Congregation ==
The church has traditionally belonged in the evangelical stream of the Church of England. More recently it has become more closely associated with a charismatic, informal approach to worship. Since 2025 Hope Church has been working in partnership with St Mary Islington.

== History ==
Building & Gardens: The church was built in 1814 to a design by William Wickings as a chapel of ease to the parish church of St. Mary's farther south on Upper Street. It became a parish church in its own right in 1894. A typical Georgian six-bay brick box with three tiers of small windows, the lowest to the crypt. The bell tower at the south of the building is square and houses eight bells, cast by John Warner and Son at their Spitalfields foundry in 1875. The bells are a “maiden” ring (they have never been re-tuned or altered in any way). Inside, the interior retains its galleries on three sides supported by Tuscan columns. Originally horse shoe-shaped these were converted to a rectangular plan when the furnishings were altered in 1894–5. Most of this work was undone in 1983, when the choir stalls and pews were removed and meeting rooms were built under the galleries. The church gardens are the church's old burial ground, which was opened to the public at the end of the 19th century, and now is a space appreciated by many for its recreational amenity.

== Music ==
Music is typically led by vocalists and a pianist and is contemporary. There are occasional lunch-time or evening concerts, advertised on the church's website. St. Mary Magdalene is home to a fine three-manual organ by George Pike England, slightly modified by the famous London firms of Henry Willis & Sons and N. P. Mander. Henry Willis himself was organist here for nearly thirty years. The organ is not in use as only about a third of its pipes are working.

== Sunday services ==
Hope Church has an 11am service every week at St Mary Magdalene. In addition, the parish runs regular prayer meetings, bible study and discussion groups, and Alpha courses three times a year.

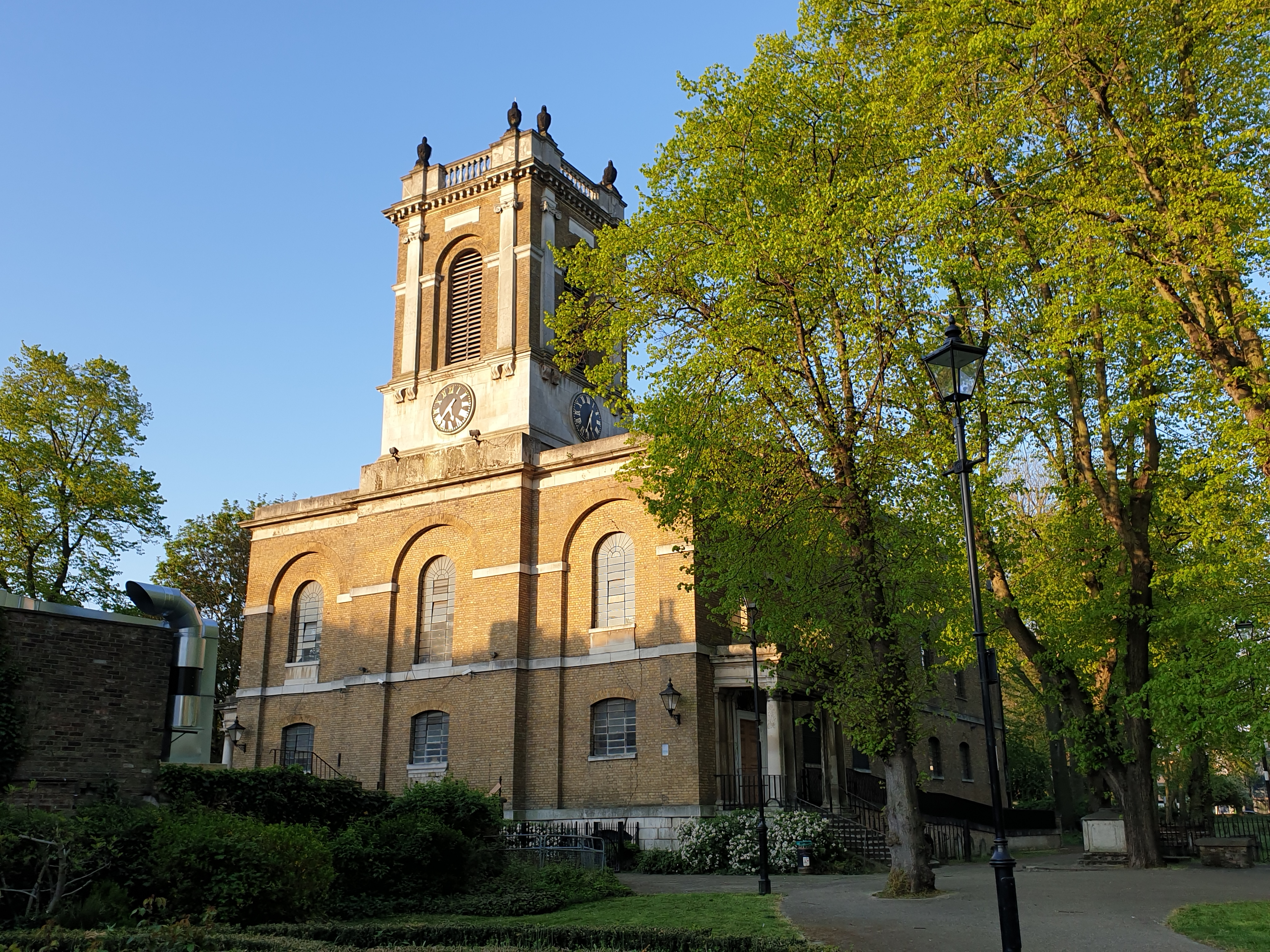
St Mary Magdalene Church

== Additional activities ==
The church's activities and ministries include Bellringers – regularly ring the church bells (practices on Wednesdays at 7–9 pm; ringing at 10–11 am Sundays)

In addition, St Mary Magdalene is closely associated with the St Mary Magdalene Academy on Liverpool Road.

Hope Church Islington is in the Deanery of Islington, in the Diocese of London (Stepney Episcopal Area).
