= The Intrepid Fox =

Former public house in Soho

Coordinates: 51°30′46.32″N 0°8′1.5″W

External image
- Photograph of The Intrepid Fox in 1911

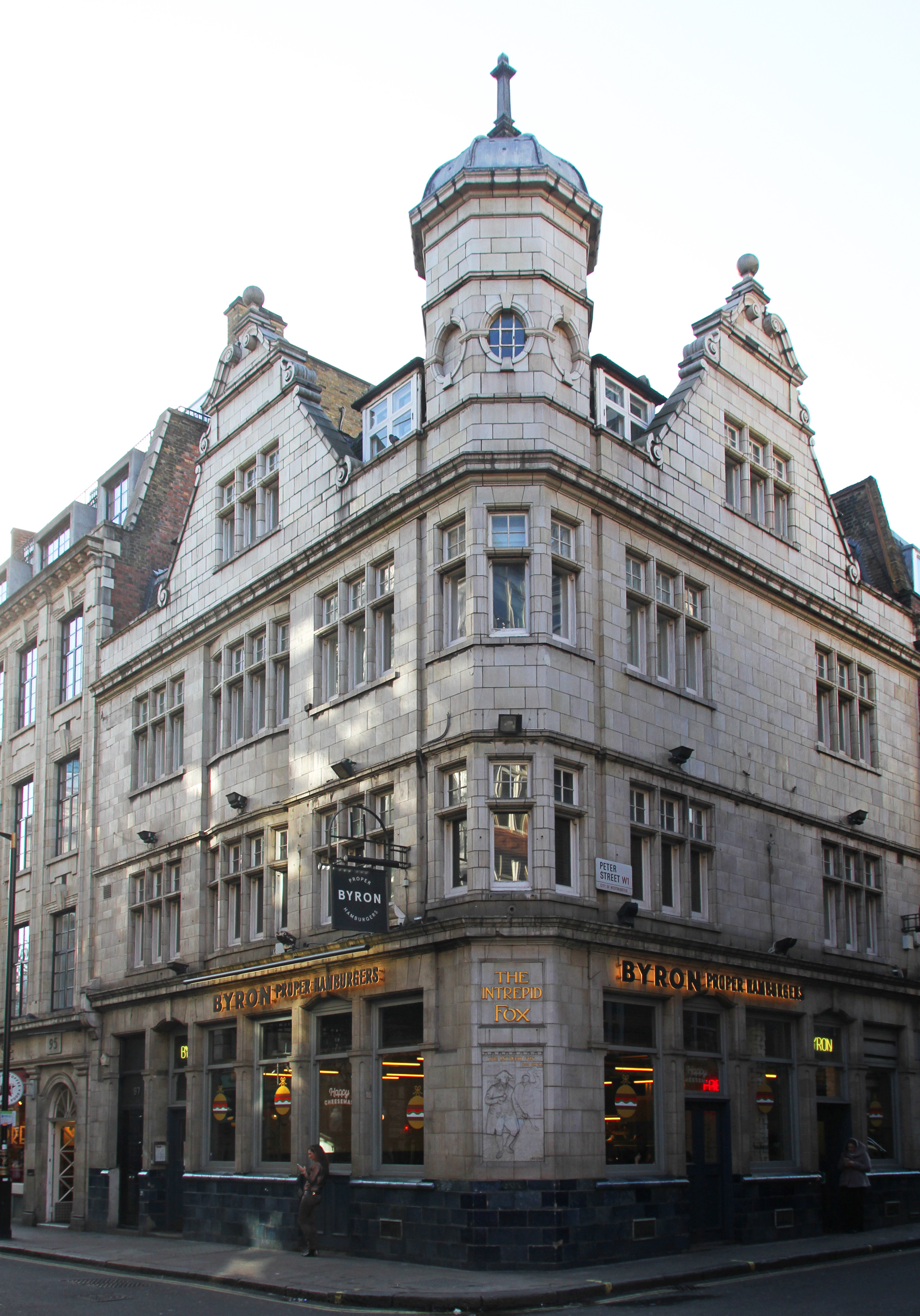
The former Intrepid Fox premises in Wardour Street

The Intrepid Fox was a pub at 97–99 Wardour Street, Soho, London, established in 1784 by the publican Samuel House, who named it after the prominent British Whig statesman Charles James Fox. The pub was located on the corner of Wardour Street and Peter Street.

During the general election of 1784, House provided free drink to the public.

More recently, it was a goth pub which also hosted heavy metal gigs. It closed in 2006, when the owner Mitchells & Butlers sold the building to property developers.

It is rumoured that Mick Jagger poached a young Ronnie Wood from Rod Stewart's band in a corner of the pub.

The Wardour Street building it formerly occupied is clad in faience, including a faience relief of Charles James Fox. As of 2017, the premises were in use as a branch of the Byron hamburger chain.

== Successor venues ==
Later in 2006, the former Intrepid Fox management team opened a new venue of the same name, near Centre Point. The Guardian reported the new venue's imminent closure in 2014.

Following the closure of this venue, a third incarnation of the Intrepid Fox was opened at the Archway Tavern later in 2014.
