= Joseph Kincaid =

Irish engineer

Joseph Kincaid MICE (12 November 1834 in Dublin – 20 August 1907 in London) was an engineer responsible for the construction of a significant number of tramways in Great Britain.

== Background ==
Kincaid's father was an early pioneer of railways, as a promoter of the Dublin and Kingstown Railway, and the Midland Great Western Railway. On account of delicate health, Joseph’s early tuition was private, but he entered Trinity College, Dublin, in 1852, graduating in Arts in 1857, and subsequently obtaining a Master's degree.

== Career ==
On leaving college he obtained practical experience as assistant engineer on the Kingstown harbour works; in the construction of the harbour at Mullaghmore, County Sligo, as Engineer-in-charge.

From 1860 to 1863, he served under Sir John Fowler, 1st Baronet and Charles Blacker Vignoles, and was engaged at home and in Spain on the construction of the Tudela and Bilbao Railway and other undertakings. He also carried out the lighting of Bilbao and Logroño with oil-gas.

His name is identified with the introduction and development of tramways in Great Britain and Ireland; his first was a horse-tramway from Dublin to Black Rock. These early tramways were constructed with a shallow rail spiked to longitudinal wood sleepers, but Kincaid recognized the defects of this and introduced a metallic system, which became known by his name, consisting of channel shaped rails fixed on cast-iron chairs embedded in concrete. This system was used for a number of years until displaced by the girder type of tramway rail.

Kincaid was amongst the first to introduce mechanical propulsion on tramways; steam-locomotives, cable-traction, and then electric traction. He was responsible for the first cable-tramway constructed in England, the Highgate Hill Cable Tramway.

In 1892 he associated with himself as partners, Mr. J. E. Waller and Edward Manville, and subsequently Philip Dawson joined the firm, which practised as Kincaid, Waller, Manville and Dawson.

He was elected an Associate of The Institution of Civil Engineers on 5 April 1870 and was transferred to the class of Members on 25 March 1879.
