= Wenzel's =

Bakery in Watford

Wenzel's The Bakers
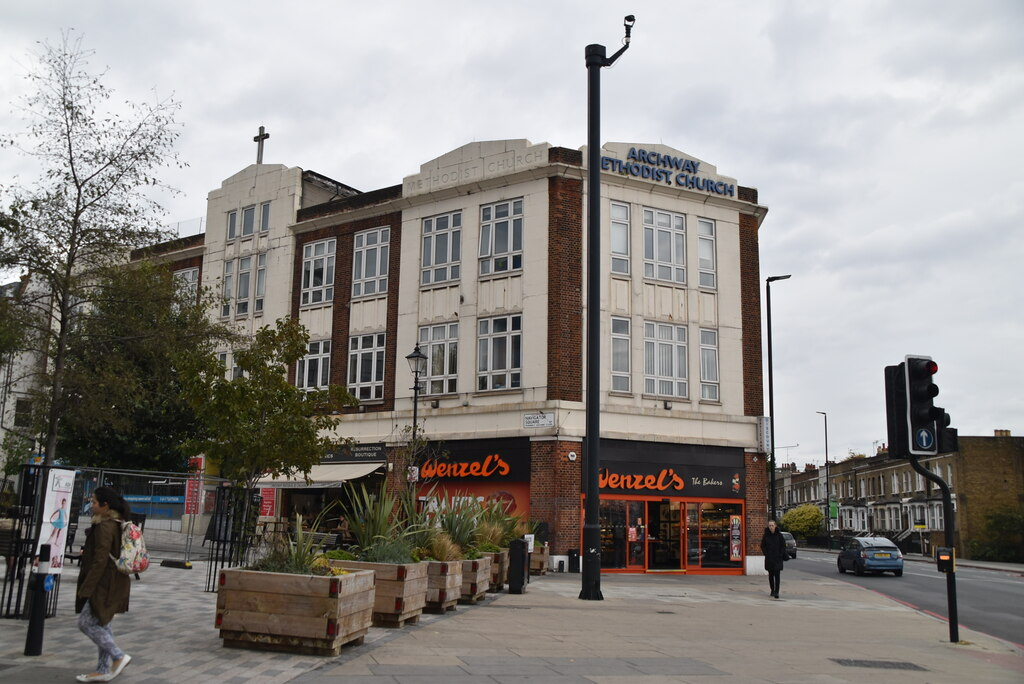
- Branch in Archway, London
- Trade name: Wenzel's
- Type: Private
- Industry: Bakery
- Founded: 1975; 51 years ago
- Headquarters: Watford, UK
- Number of locations: ▲109 (2025)
- Area served: Home Counties, South England
- Website: wenzels.co.uk

Wenzel's is a British bakery chain, which operates in west and north-west London and the surrounding Home Counties. As of 2025, the company had 109 branches.

The company was founded in 1975 and is based in Watford, Hertfordshire.
