= The Bomb Factory Art Foundation =

British arts organisation

Coordinates: 51.5660°N 0.1314°W

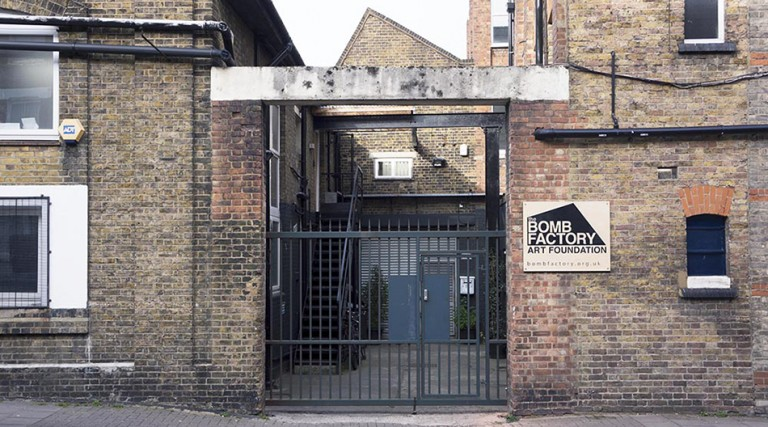
- The Bomb Factory entrance.
- Founded: 2015
- Founder: Pallas Citroen
- Type: Artist-led organisation
- Purpose: Contemporary art
- Location: 9–15 Elthorne Road, Upper Holloway, London N19 4AJ, United Kingdom
- Region served: United Kingdom
- Method: Exhibitions, events
- Website: www.bombfactory.org.uk

The Bomb Factory Art Foundation is an artist-led foundation with exhibition space for contemporary art, based in Archway, Islington, London, England.

The Bomb Factory organises exhibitions and events, including open studio events.

Exhibited artists include Rachel Ara, Alfie Kunga, Paul Stafford, Mark Wallinger (2007 Turner Prize winner), Jwan Yosef (founder member). and Polly Morgan.
