= Highgate Hill Cable Tramway =

Former cable tramway in London

Coordinates: 51.5691°N 0.1421°W

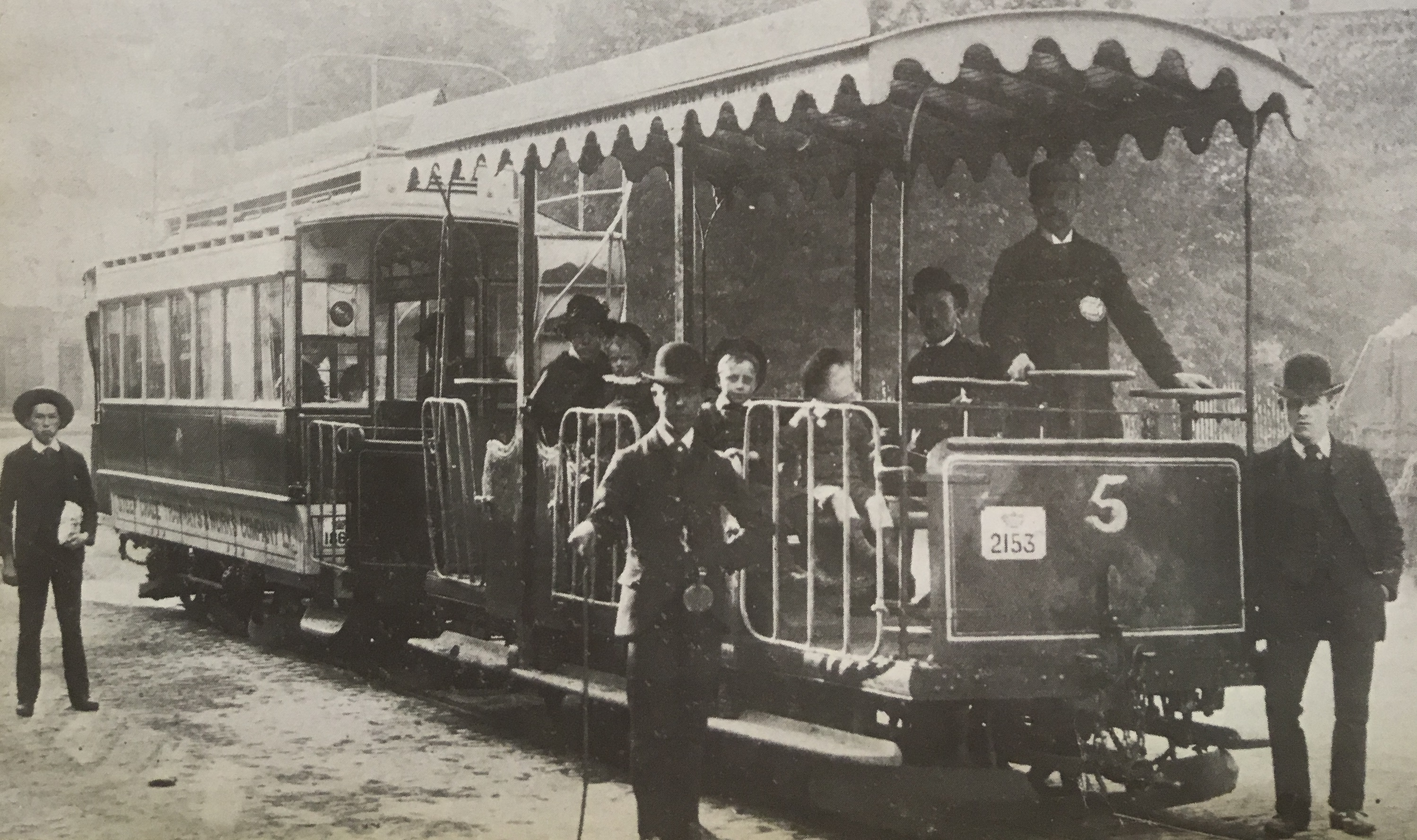
- Tram with carriage.

Operation
- Locale: Archway and Highgate Village, London, UK
- Open: 29 May 1884
- Close: 23 August 1909
- Status: Closed
- Routes: Archway Tavern to Highgate Village
- Owner: Highgate Hill Tramways Co.

Infrastructure
- Track gauge: 3ft 6in
- Propulsion system: Moving cable
- Depot(s): 6-8 Highgate High Street
- Stock: 3 tractors, 8 carriages

Statistics
- Route length: 0.71 miles (1.14 km)

The Highgate Hill Cable Tramway was the first cable tramway in Europe. Opened in 1884, it was built to demonstrate the benefits of the technology first pioneered in San Francisco.

== Origin ==
The 1860s and 70s saw a boom in horse tramway construction all over the world. Cable haulage had been used in Britain since the 1830s in coal mines and on some short sections of passenger railways, but the grip system patented by Hallidie represented a major technical advance on these operations.

The world's first successful cable tramway was opened in San Francisco, USA, by London-born Andrew Smith Hallidie in 1873 using a constantly moving cable in a conduit with grippers on the cars which could be engaged or disengaged by their drivers.

== Establishment ==
In 1881 the Steep Grade Tramways & Works Company Ltd was incorporated, one of its directors being William Booth Scott, the Chief Surveyor for St. Pancras Borough Council. To build the Highgate Hill Tramway from Archway Tavern to South Grove, Highgate Village they issued 6,000 shares of £5 each and a prospectus endorsed by Sir Sydney Waterlow of Fairseat, who had seen the system operate in the USA.

The Highgate Hill system was designed by William E. Eppelsheimer, who had designed the pioneering Clay Street Hill Railroad and created the grip currently used by San Francisco cable cars. It was constructed by the Patent Cable Tramways Corporation. The engineers for the tramway's construction were Joseph Kincaid and an American, S. Bucknall Smith, who said the route was chosen as the one nearest London which could be used for demonstration purposes. The line linked the busy horse tram terminus at the Archway Tavern with Highgate Village, running up Highgate Hill, with its gradient of 1:11, which was too steep for horse-drawn trams or buses.

== Design and construction ==
It was built on the narrow gauge of 3 ft 6 in (1,067 mm) and was double track over its lower length, converging to single track with two passing loops for its last 330 yards (300 m). The depot and cable winding house, which was demolished in 1983, was near the brow of the hill behind 6-8 Highgate High Street. The moving cable, which had a speed of 6.5 miles per hour (10.5 km/h), was powered by a large steam-powered stationary engine in the winding house, whose tall chimney was a feature of the Highgate skyline. The initial rolling stock was dummy grip cars, pulling trailers which could go on to other lines pulled by horses. After problems with the connection between the cars and the trailers the company was required to use single unit cars. These cars, in dark blue and cream livery, were double deck, carrying 26 passengers inside and 28 on the roof.

== Operation ==
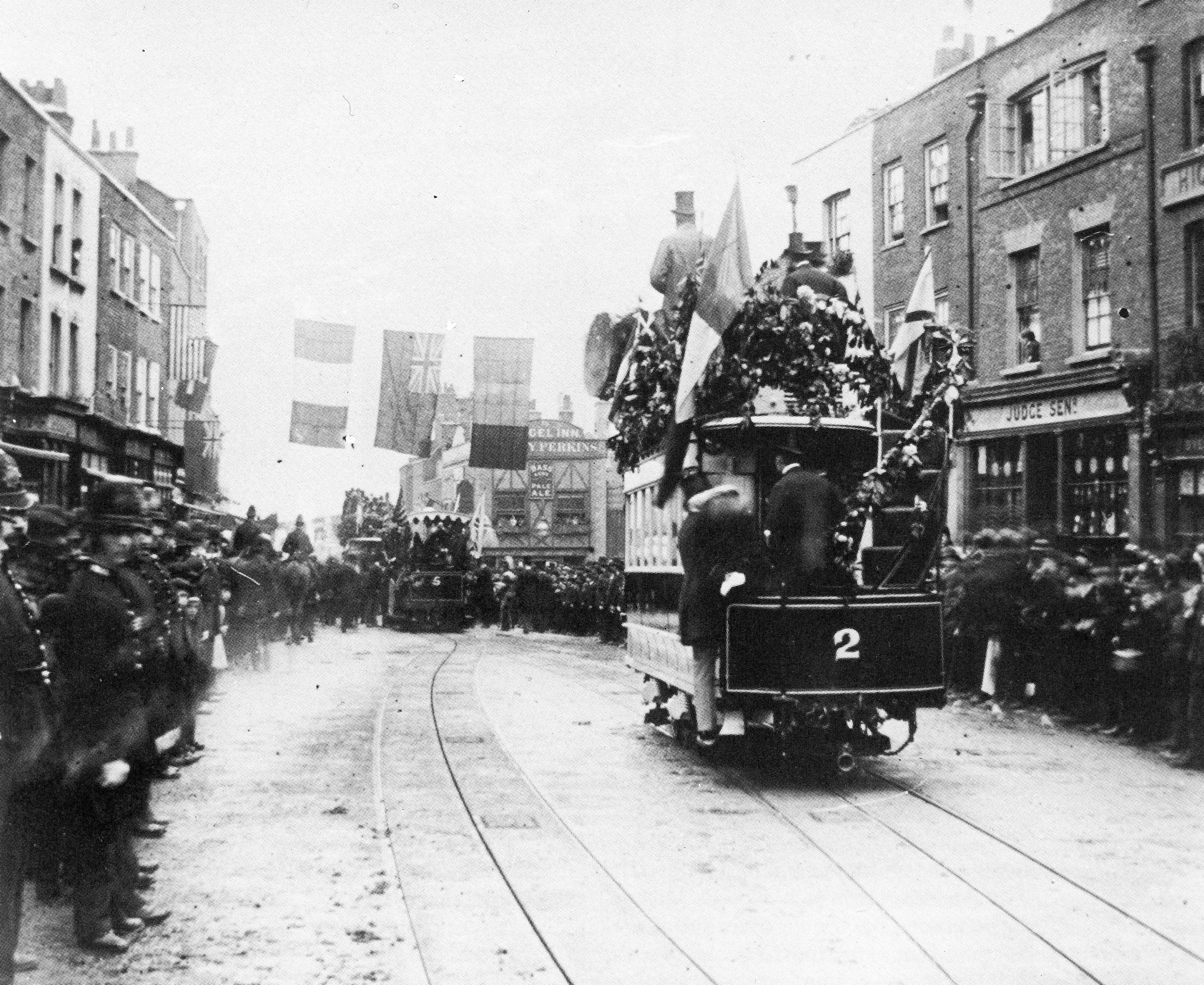
Opening of the Highgate Hill Cable Tramway in 1884

On 29 May 1884, the line was opened by the Lord Mayor of London, Sir Robert Fowler, and was operated by the Highgate Hill Tramways Company (the successor to the Steep Grade Tramways & Works Co. Ltd who had obtained the original authority). A fatal accident on 5 December 1892, after a cable snapped and the runaway cable car crashed, saw the tramway closed down; this was only one in a series of (mainly financial) problems which eventually resulted in the liquidation of the company later that month.

After a further change of company owner, on 14 August 1896 the line was sold to a new concern, the Highgate Hill Tramways Ltd, and was reopened on 19 April (Easter Monday) following year. The Company apparently considered converting the line into a standard gauge electric tramway but got nowhere with the idea, caught as it was in the middle of a London County Council (LCC) and Middlesex County Council (MCC) rivalry, making it difficult for the company to gain the necessary authority.

From 1905, the line had to compete with the long-awaited electrified tram track along Archway Road, beneath the new Archway Bridge, built by the MCC and leased to the Metropolitan Electric Tramways Company.

== Closure ==
In 1909 it was agreed that the LCC would buy its portion of the cable tramway for £13,099, effective from 24 August, and the MCC would purchase its 400 yards at the village end for £6,377, which it would then lease back to the LCC for working. Cable operation ceased immediately and the tramway was closed for reconstruction, reopening eight months later as part of the London County Council Tramways standard gauge electric tramway network. The cable cars were sold for scrap. The new electric line had double track over the entire route which meant one wing of Fairseat, Sydney Waterlow's old house, had to be demolished. Fairseat is now Channing Junior School

== Bibliography ==
- Victor Goldberg, Oliver Green (1984). Cable Tramways, leaflet no.LF00112. London Transport Museum.
- Richardson, John (1983), Highgate: Its History since the Fifteenth Century, Eyre and Spottiswoode, ISBN 0-9503656-4-5
- Turner, Keith (2007). Directory of British Tramways, Volume 1. Tempus. ISBN 9780752439013.
