= St Mary Magdalene Gardens =

Park in Islington, north London

Coordinates: 51°32′53″N 0°6′24″W

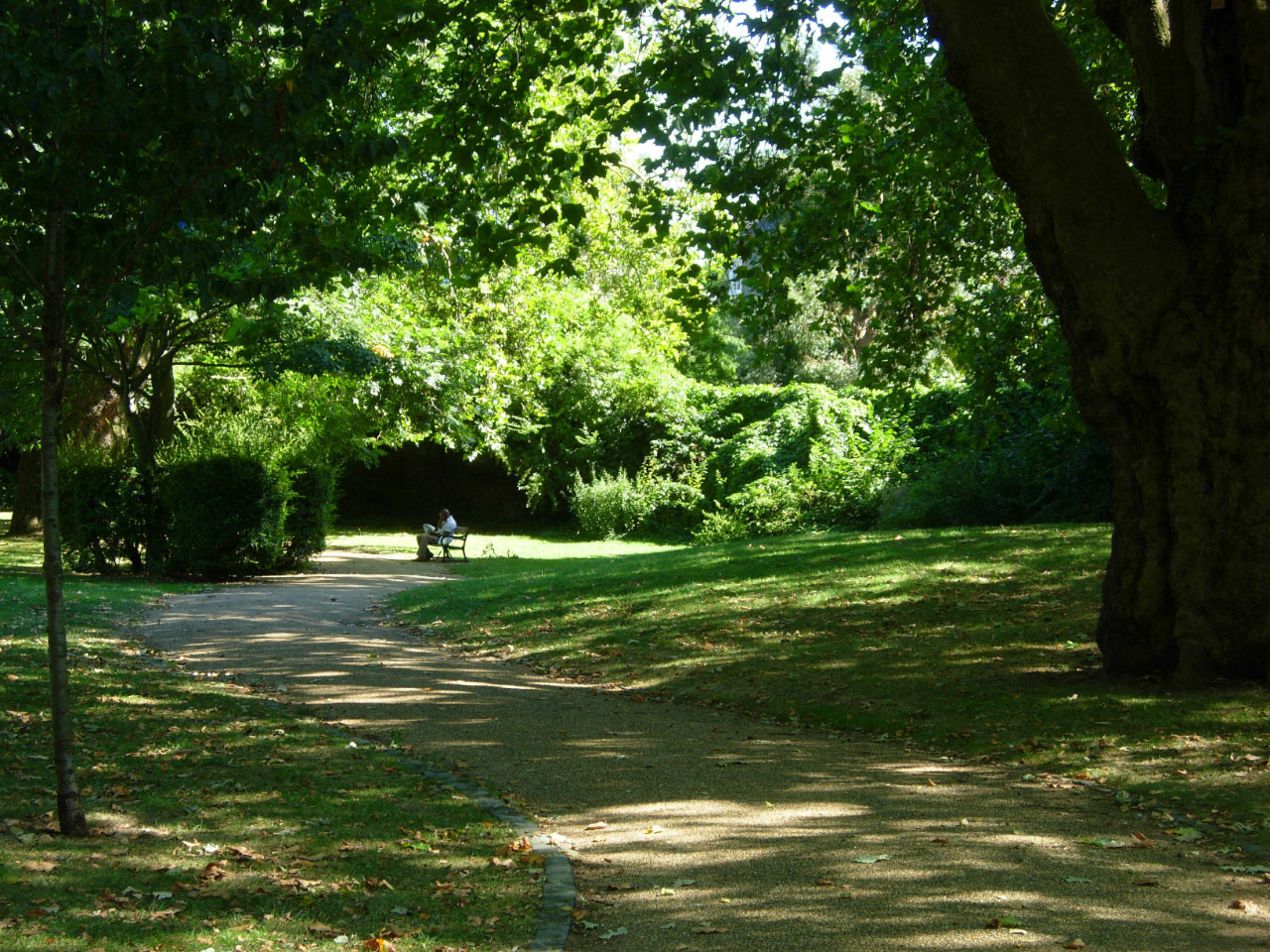
- St Mary Magdalene Gardens photo: Stephen McKay, geograph.org.uk
- Interactive map of St Mary Magdalene Gardens
- Type: public garden
- Location: London, England
- Area: 1.82 hectares (4 acres)
- Created: 1894
- Operator: London Borough of Islington
- Open: 8am-dusk
- Status: Open year round
- Website: islington.gov.uk

St Mary Magdalene Gardens is a public open space located between Holloway Road and Liverpool Road in Islington, north London. It is located on the old burial ground of St Mary Magdalene Church.

== History ==
The Grade II* listed church of St Mary Magdalene was built in 1814 as a chapel of ease for St Mary's, the parish church of Islington. The burial grounds surrounding them were transformed into a public garden in 1894, with costs being met by London County Council and the local vestry.

== Layout and notable features ==
The garden extends to 1.82 hectares (4 acres) and includes notable specimens of ash, lime and London plane trees, with one specimen of plane potentially dating from the 18th century.

A plaque at the entry records its conversion to a public garden. Most graves and headstones are located close to the church building. The garden was refurbished in 2010, with the addition of new lighting, signage, seating, plantings and nestboxes. The garden is in a conservation area and is considered of local importance. Although belonging to the church, the gardens are maintained by the Islington Greenspace and Leisure Team, which manages the borough's parks and open spaces.

Friends of St Mary Magdalene Gardens was set up in 2005 by different parties, including the council, local residents and members of the church to discuss the future use and development of the park.

== See also ==
- Mary Magdalene
