= Upper Holloway =

Area of North London, England

Coordinates: 51.564°N 0.133°W

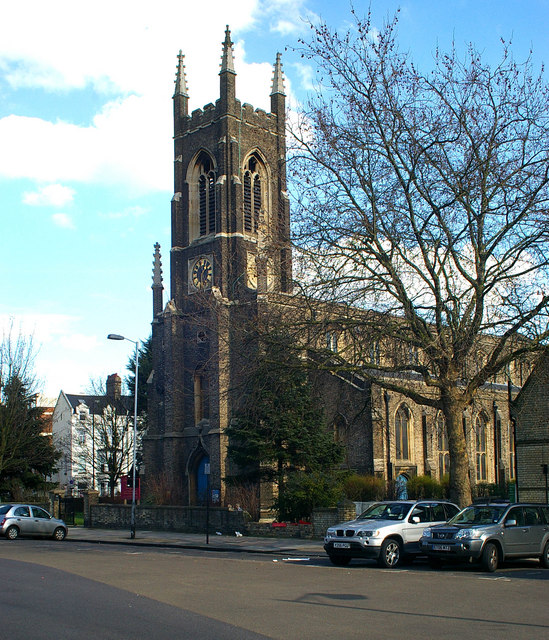
- Church of St John

- Location within Greater London
- OS grid reference: TQ295869
  - Charing Cross: 3.75 mi (6.0 km) N
- London borough: Islington
- Ceremonial county: Greater London
- Region: London
- Country: England
- Sovereign state: United Kingdom
- Post town: LONDON
- Postcode district: N19
- Dialling code: 020
- Police: Metropolitan
- Fire: London
- Ambulance: London
- UK Parliament: Islington North
- London Assembly: North East

Upper Holloway is an area in the London Borough of Islington, London, centred on the upper part of Holloway Road and Junction Road, forming part of North London.

== History ==
A map showing the Upper Holloway ward of Islington Metropolitan Borough as it appeared in 1916.

=== Toponymy ===
The part of the Great North Road through north of the parish of Islington was known as the Holloway by 1307, a name later applied to the communities that formed along it. Upper Holloway is the original designation of the N19 postal district and the term is still used by the Royal Mail.

=== Urban development ===
Upper Holloway was one of several hamlets within the ancient parish of St Mary Islington. As the population of the parish was increasing, the Church of St John Upper Holloway was built to meet local need, using the provisions of the Church Building Act 1818. It was consecrated in 1828 and in 1830 a new ecclesiastical parish was created, beginning the subdivision of the parish of Islington for this purpose.

The area around Hornsey Road was traditionally known as "Tollington" and this name was used in the Domesday Book. This name has largely fallen out of use, but it remains as the name as an electoral ward on the local council and also of the parish of the Church of England in the area, and some local businesses still use the name in their name.

== Media ==
The classic late Victorian comic novel Diary of a Nobody is set in Upper Holloway. The BBC's BBC Doomsday Project has some content for this area.

== See also ==
- The Bomb Factory Art Foundation
