= Archway Tavern =

Pub in Archway, London

Coordinates: 51.5660°N 0.1350°W

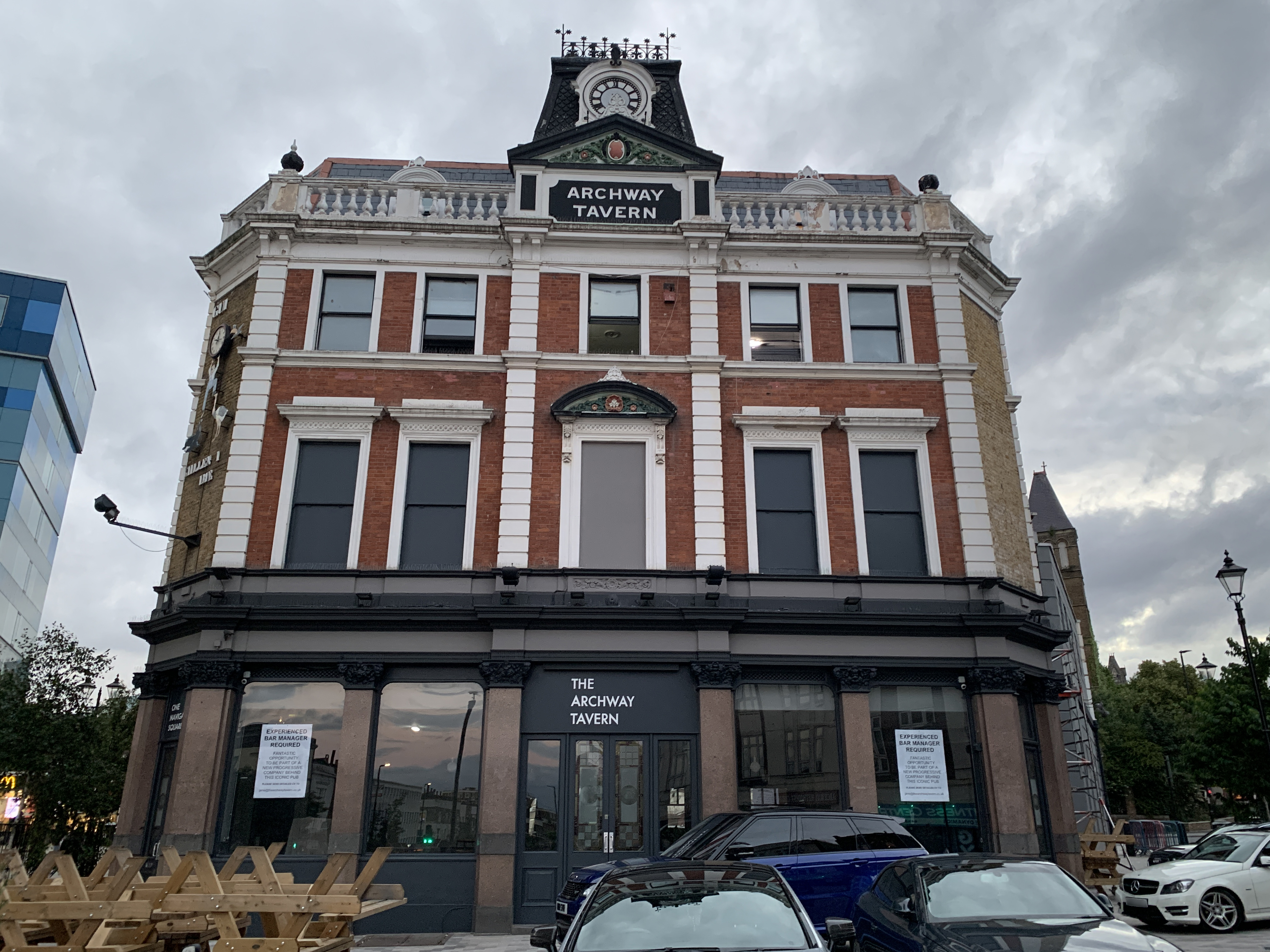
The Archway Tavern in 2020, after the revitalisation

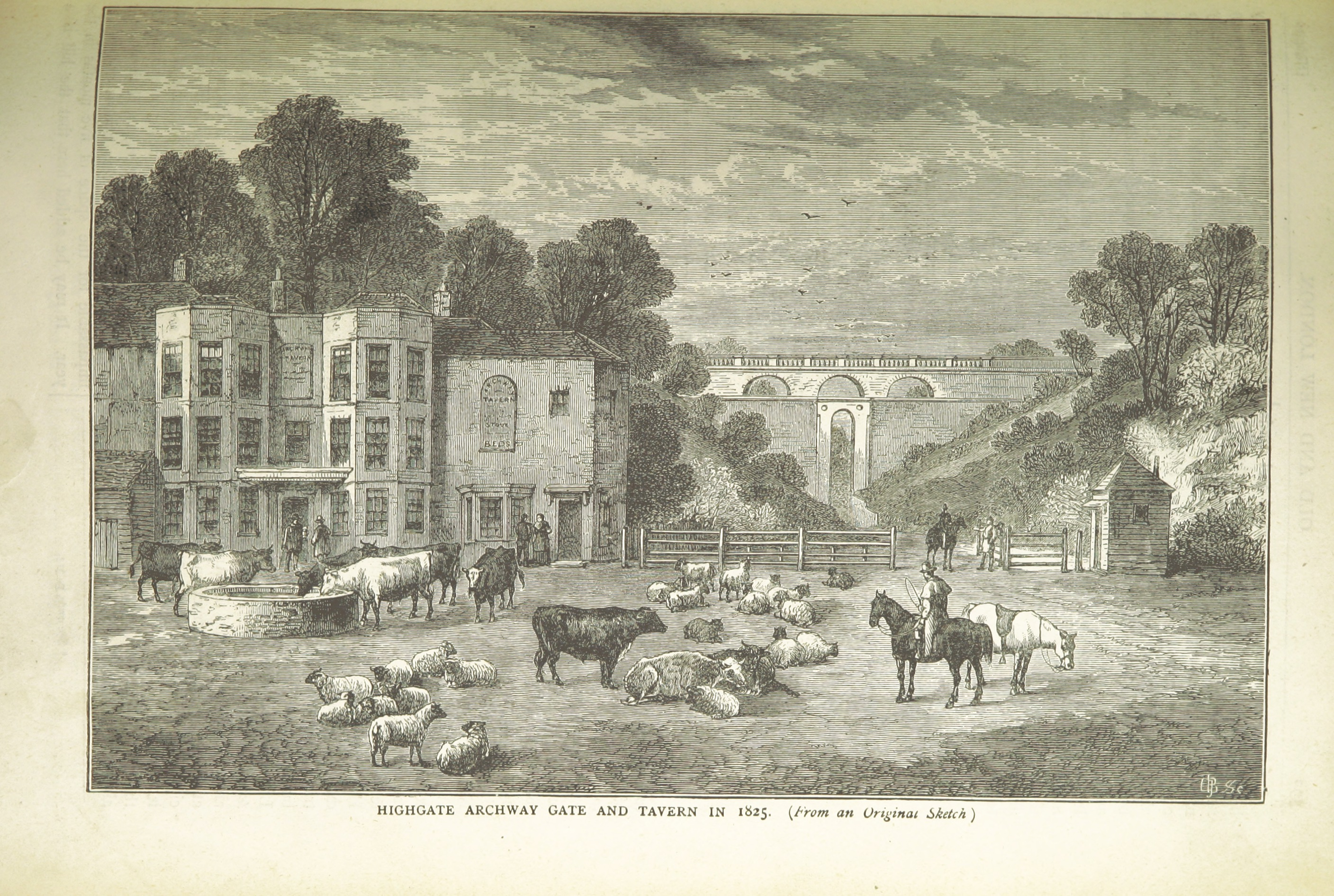
Highgate Archway Toll Gate and Tavern in 1825

The Archway Tavern in Archway, London, is on Highgate Hill near Archway tube station.

In late 1812 the first Archway Tavern was the ordinary house surrounded by gardens on the corner of Archway Road and Highgate Hill in this print.. Archway Road opened in 1813 and by 1817 the house had become the pub shown in this print: the prominent part is a two-storey extension which completely filled the side garden. By this date the toll gate had been moved from its original site in the Archway itself. The current building was built in 1888. At one point, a cable car service up Highgate Hill terminated outside the tavern.

In 2014, the Archway Tavern was closed because of a licensing dispute. It was briefly re-opened as the Intrepid Fox, and at one point operated as a venue called Dusk till Dawn, but remained largely closed for several years. In 2020, plans were made to reopen it, following the resolution of licensing issues regarding the pub and its adjacent nightclub. As of 2021, the pub is back to being open full time.

During the shutdown, the building was locally listed by Islington Council as "a historic feature and a focal point of the Town Centre" to resist any change of use of the building from being a public house. The building is now owned by the property company Searchgrade Limited, which bought it for £3.8m in 2019.

The interior of the pub was used as the cover of The Kinks' studio album Muswell Hillbillies.
