= Vantage Point (London) =

High-rise building in Archway, London

Coordinates: 51°33′56″N 0°08′06″W

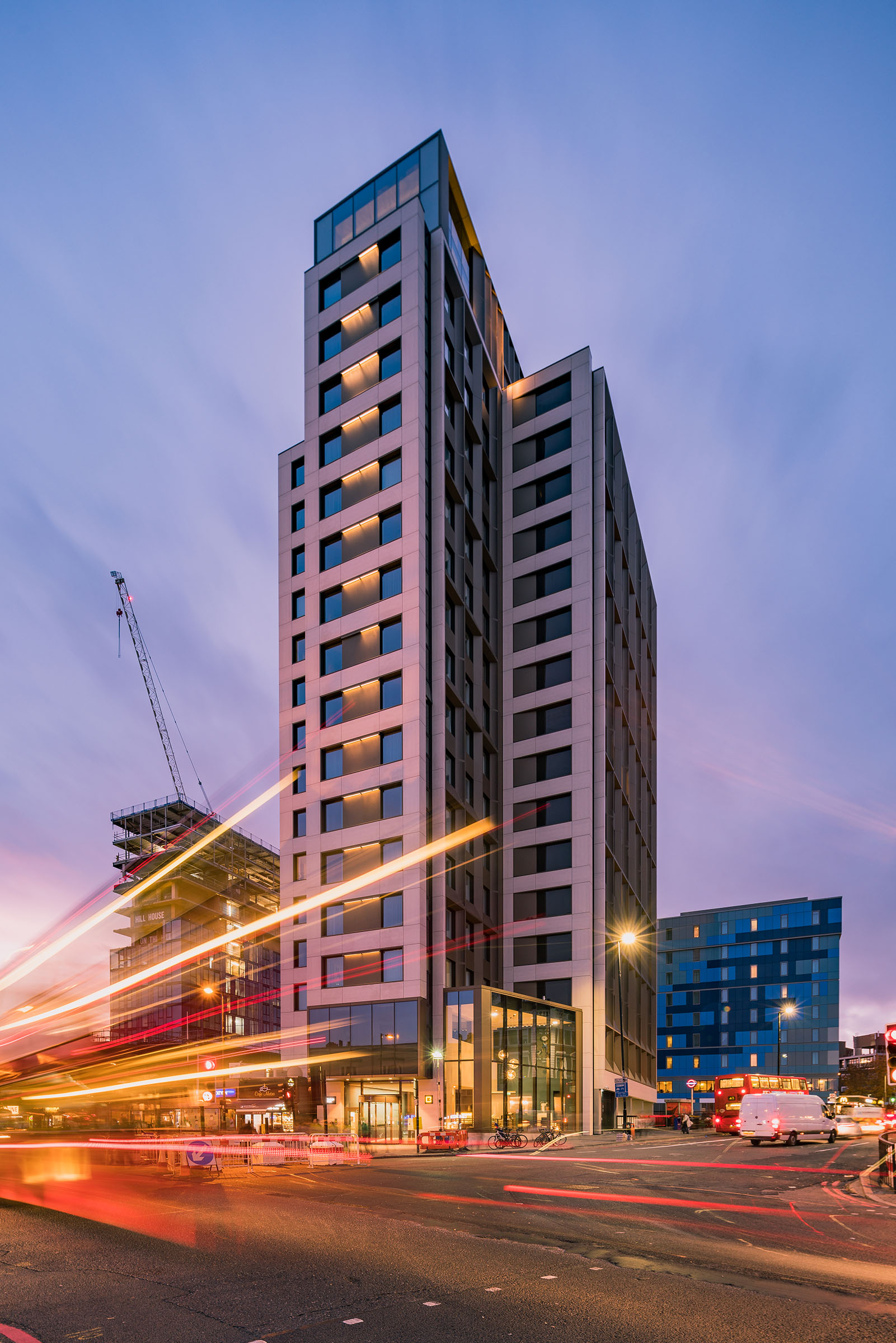
Vantage Point

Vantage Point (formerly Archway Tower designed by Oscar Garry & Partners Architects) is a 195-foot (59m) 17-storey residential apartment building above Archway Underground station, designed by Grid Architects, and owned and operated by Essential Living. In 2017 Vantage point won an RIBA award.

== History ==
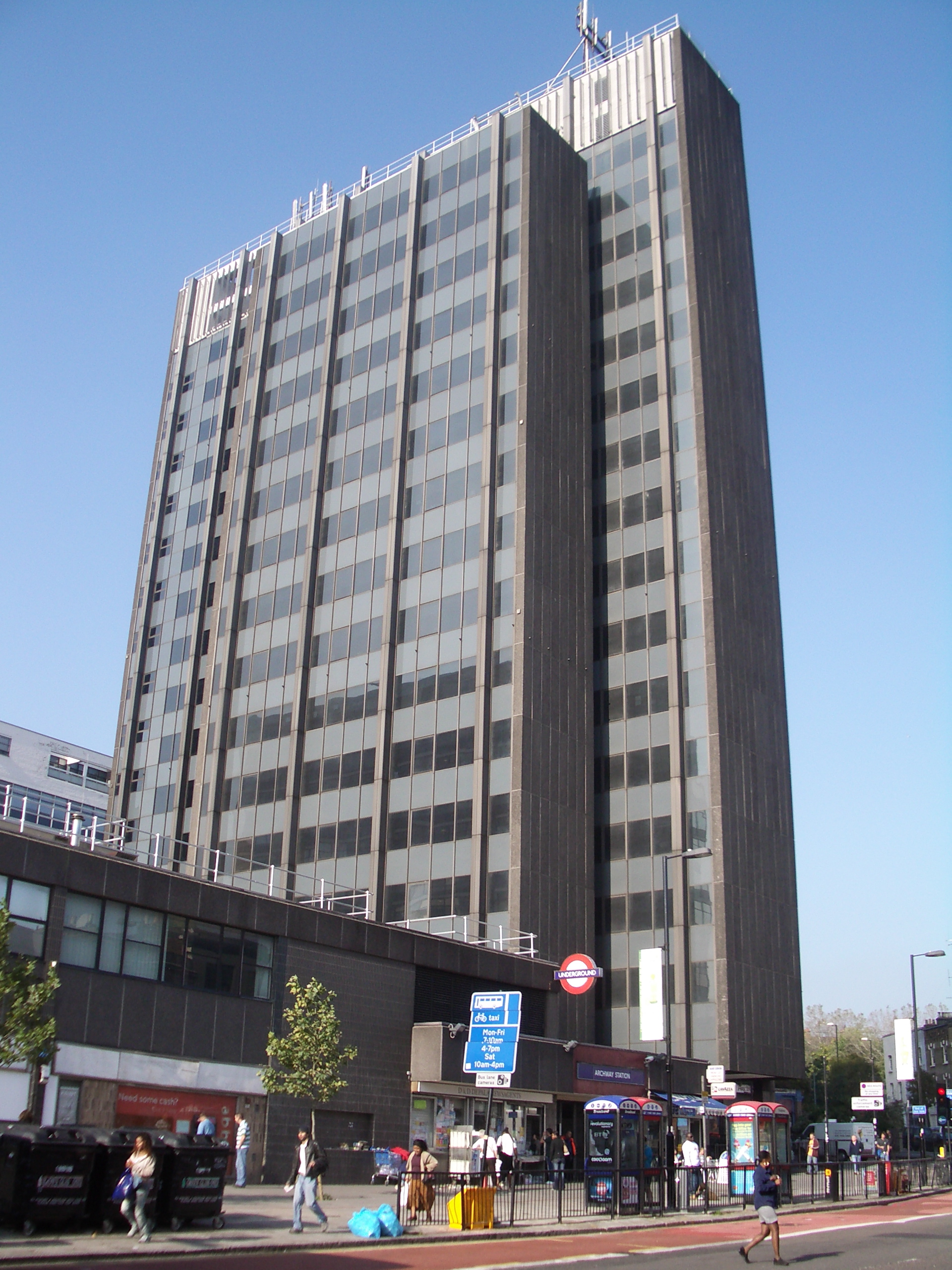
Archway Tower

Archway Tower was built in 1973, by Cubitts. In 1977? the building was sold off and rented back on a 42-year lease and used for Social Security. The building was empty for several years before becoming home to the Public Guardianship Office in 2001, which became the Court of Protection and the Office of the Public Guardian in 2007. In October 2007, the tower was sold by Wichford plc to Scarborough Property Group. The Court and the Office of the Public Guardian vacated the building in 2011.

After sitting vacant for 2 years, Essential Living purchased Archway Tower in 2013 for £6 million, with plans to make the building "one of the country’s biggest office to residential conversions".

== Refurbishment for rental ==
=== Design ===
The project involved the change of use from commercial to residential and a re-cladding.

The change of use and refurbishment of a 50-year-old building presented significant challenges. Whilst the 1960s construction was very robust, the construction tolerances acceptable during construction of the building have been very different to those at time of the refurbishment. This meant that interfaces between the old structure and the new façade needed to be very well thought through and detailed. Issues such as cold bridging, loading factors and the use of asbestos were all addressed during the design phase.

=== Completion ===
After 2 years' construction the renamed building reopened on 1 September 2016.

Vantage Point now has 118 studio, 1-bedroom and 2-bedroom rental flats on floors 1–15, along with shared amenity space on the 16th and 17th floors.

== In popular culture ==
Archway Tower is said to have inspired the song "Archway Towers" by New Model Army. Toppers' House in Nick Hornby's 2005 novel A Long Way Down is said to have been indirectly inspired by Archway Tower, but also by the eponymous Archway over Archway Road.
