= Carreras Cigarette Factory =

Art deco building in London, England

Carreras Factory
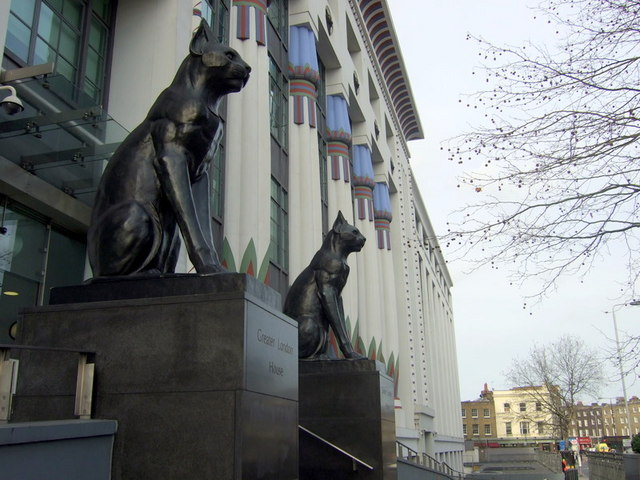
- The black cats on guard in front of the building
- Interactive map of the Carreras Factory area
- Alternative names: Arcadia Works; Greater London House; The Black Cat Factory

General information
- Type: Former cigarette factory converted for office use
- Architectural style: Art Deco Egyptian Revival
- Location: Mornington Crescent, Camden Town, Greater London House, 180 Hampstead Road, London NW1 7AW, London, England
- Coordinates: 51.5335°N 0.1398°W
- Current tenants: British Heart Foundation, ASOS.com, Wunderman Thompson, WPP, Radley & Co and others
- Construction started: 1926
- Completed: 1928
- Renovated: 1996

Design and construction
- Architects: M. E. Collins, O. H. Collins & A. G. Porri

Renovating team
- Renovating firm: Finch Forman
- Awards: Civic Trust Award

The Carreras Cigarette Factory (now officially called Greater London House) is a large art deco building in Camden, London, England. It is noted as a striking example of early 20th Century Egyptian Revival architecture. The building was erected in 1926–28 by the Carreras Tobacco Company (the largest share-holder of which was the Russian-Jewish inventor and philanthropist Bernhard Baron) on the communal garden area of Mornington Crescent, to a design by architects M. E. and O. H. Collins and A. G. Porri. It is 550 feet (168 metres) long, and is mainly white.

The building's distinctive Egyptian-style ornamentation originally included a solar disc to the Sun-god Ra, two gigantic effigies of black cats flanking the entrance and colourful painted details. When the factory was converted into offices in 1961 the Egyptian detailing was lost, but it was restored during a renovation in the late 1990s, and replicas of the cats were placed outside the entrance.

The building is located at the northern end of Hampstead Road and faces out over Harrington Square.

== History ==
As demand for cigarettes increased during the First World War, the Carreras Tobacco Company expanded its business in the 1920s, like many other tobacco companies. Carreras had outgrown its Arcadia cigarette factory in City Road, London, so it closed the facility and opened a new Arcadia Works in 1928 in Mornington Crescent, Camden.

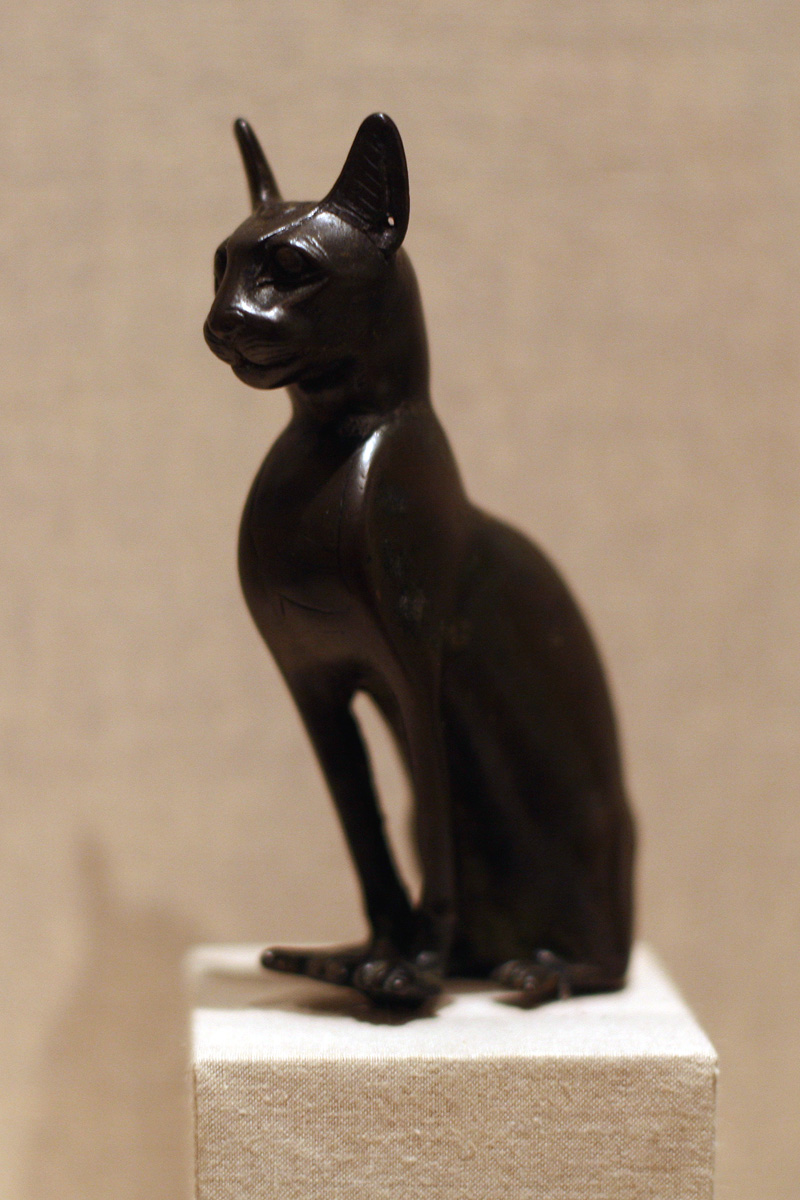
Statue of Bastet (664–342 BC)

The architects of the Camden Arcadia Works were Marcus Evelyn Collins and O.H. Collins, along with Arthur George Porri (1877–1962), who adapted the Collins plans. The design was greatly influenced by the contemporary fashion for Egyptian-style buildings and decorative arts. The Carreras building was designed four years after Howard Carter's 1922 expedition which uncovered the tomb of Tutankhamun, which had popularised Egyptian themes in the minds of many Art Deco architects at the time. The vogue for Egyptian Art Deco was also aroused by architectural displays at the Paris Exhibition of 1925, as well as various spectacular Hollywood portrayals of Ancient Egypt. Collins, Collins and Porri additionally drew inspiration from the displays at the British Museum. Commentators on the architecture have also speculated that the use of Egyptian decoration was used to create an association of the "luxury" image of smoking with the treasures of Ancient Egypt.

Furthermore, between the 1880s and the end of World War 1, the Egyptian cigarette industry was a globally successful manufacturer and exporter of cigarettes. Non-Egyptian tobacco companies adopted Egyptian motifs in their advertising to take advantage of this, although the Egyptian industry had begun to decline by the late 1920s as popular taste shifted away from the Turkish tobacco it used.

The building was opened to great fanfare; a ceremony held in front of the building involved covering the pavements in front of the building with sand to replicate the deserts of Egypt. There was a procession of cast members from a contemporary London production of Verdi's opera Aida, actors in Ancient Egyptian costume performed around the "temple" structure, and a chariot race was held on the Hampstead Road.

The Craven A black cat brand

Dominating the entrance to the building were two large 8.5-foot (2.6 m)-high bronze statues of cats, stylised versions of the Egyptian god Bastet (or Bubastis, or Bast), which had been cast at the Haskins Foundry in London. The image of a black cat was a branding device which Carreras used on the packets of their Craven A range of cigarettes. The building had thus been conceived as a "temple" to Bastet, and the architects' original drawings reveal that it was to be named Bast House (the name was dropped due to unfortunate similarities to derogatory words in English).

The cats stood guard over Arcadia Works until 1959 when Carreras merged with Rothmans of Pall Mall and moved to a new factory in Basildon, Essex. The cats were removed from the building and separated; one was transported to Essex to stand at the Basildon works, the other exported to Jamaica to stand outside the Carreras factory in Spanish Town.

In 1960–62, the Camden Arcadia Works were converted into offices. The building was refurbished and stripped of all its Egyptian decoration, which was now out of fashion, in an attempt to give it a simpler, more Modernist appearance. At this time, it was renamed Greater London House.

In 1996, the building was purchased by Resolution GLH who commissioned architects Finch Forman to restore the building to its former glory. The restorers consulted the original designs and aimed to recreate 80-90% of the original Art Deco features, including installing replicas of the famous cat statues. The restoration work won a Civic Trust Award.

== Architecture ==
The Carreras Cigarette Factory was faced in Atlas White cement, coloured to look like sand. The front of the building was lined with a colonnade of twelve large papyriform columns, painted in bright colours with Venetian glass decoration. The columns are thought to have been inspired by columns at tombs in Amarna. The main entrance was approached by a staircase, the handrails designed in the shape of serpents mounted on the wall with bronze human hands. The entrance itself was designed in the style of a tent, similar to the cavetto-moulded lintels seen in architecture dating from the Old Kingdom. Above the door was a carved Horus of Behdet, a symbol of the winged disk of the Sun. During World War II it was felt that this symbol resembled too closely the eagle imagery of the Third Reich and it was covered up. It was not replaced during the 1990s restoration. Cow-horned Hathor lamps stood in front of the black cat statues. The repeated black cat logo also featured across the front of the building. Ornamental railings around the building featured Egyptian hieroglyphs.

The building was the first factory in Britain to make use of pre-stressed concrete technology, the first to contain air conditioning and a dust extraction plant.

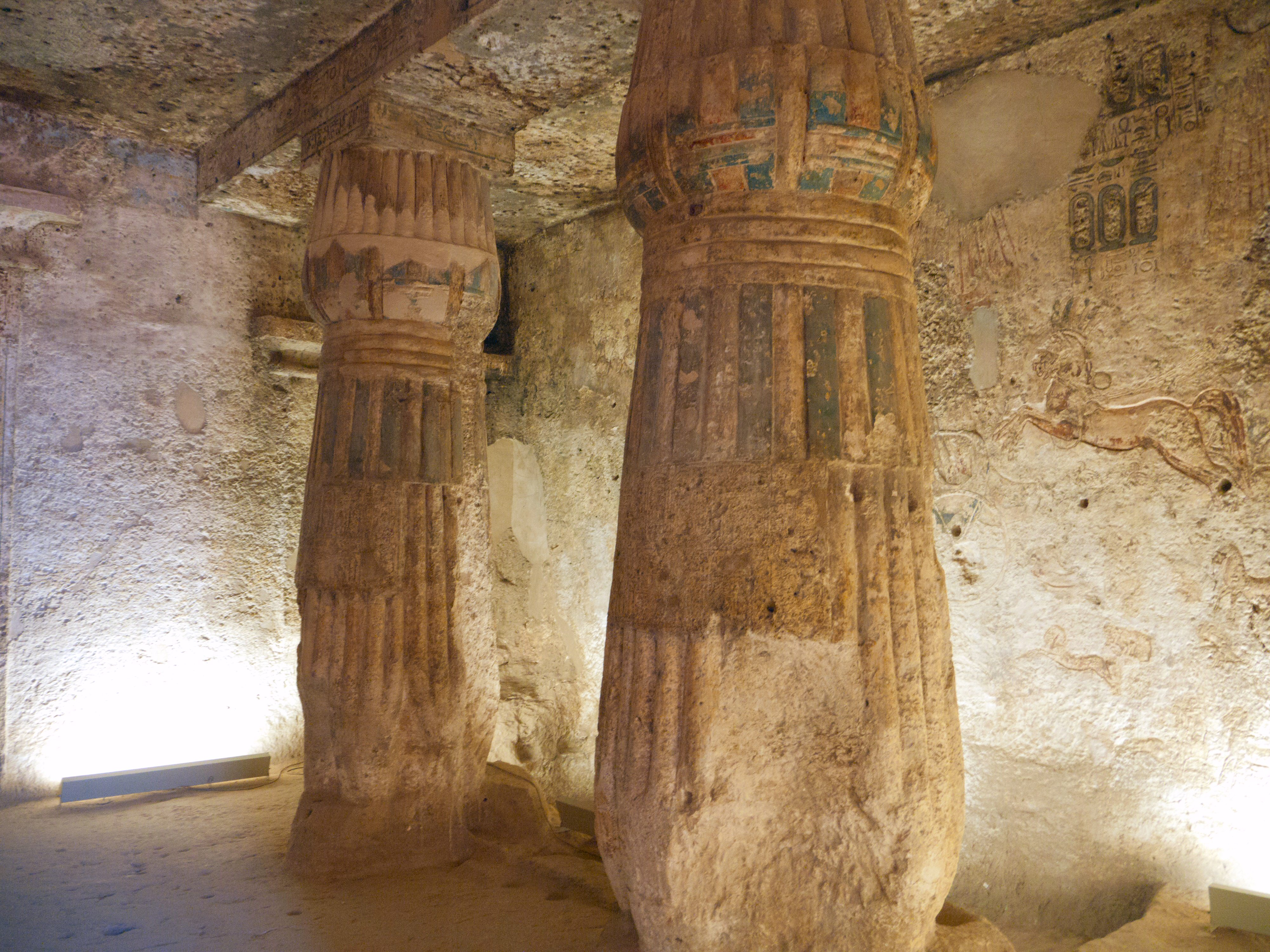
Columns at the tomb of Panehesy (c.1330 BC)

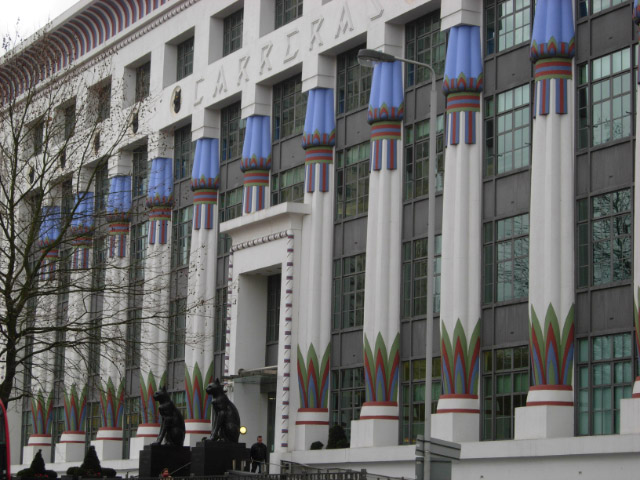
The ornate Egyptian colonnade(restored)

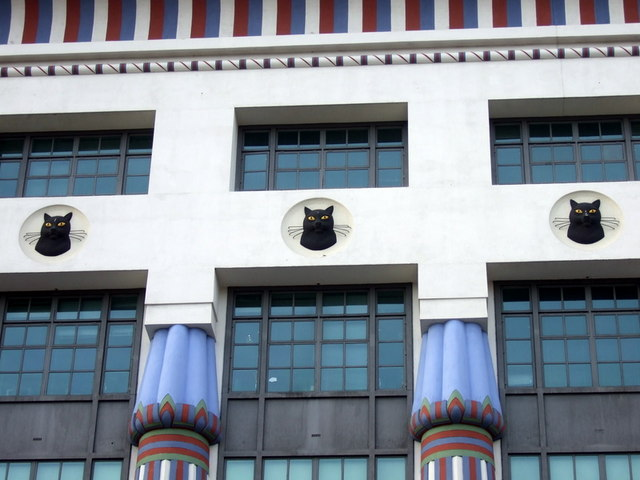
The cat motifs on the façade

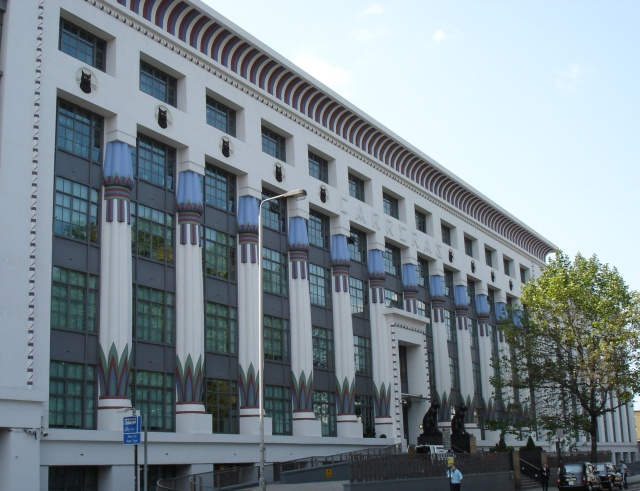
The front seen from the south

== The building today ==
Greater London House today houses offices for ASOS.com, the British Heart Foundation, Wunderman Thompson, WPP, Revlon Radley + Co. The building features in the BBC comedy television series W1A as the offices of Fun Media.

== See also ==
- List of Art Deco architecture in the United Kingdom
