= Sir Louis Baron, 1st Baronet =

British tobacco and cigarette manufacturer

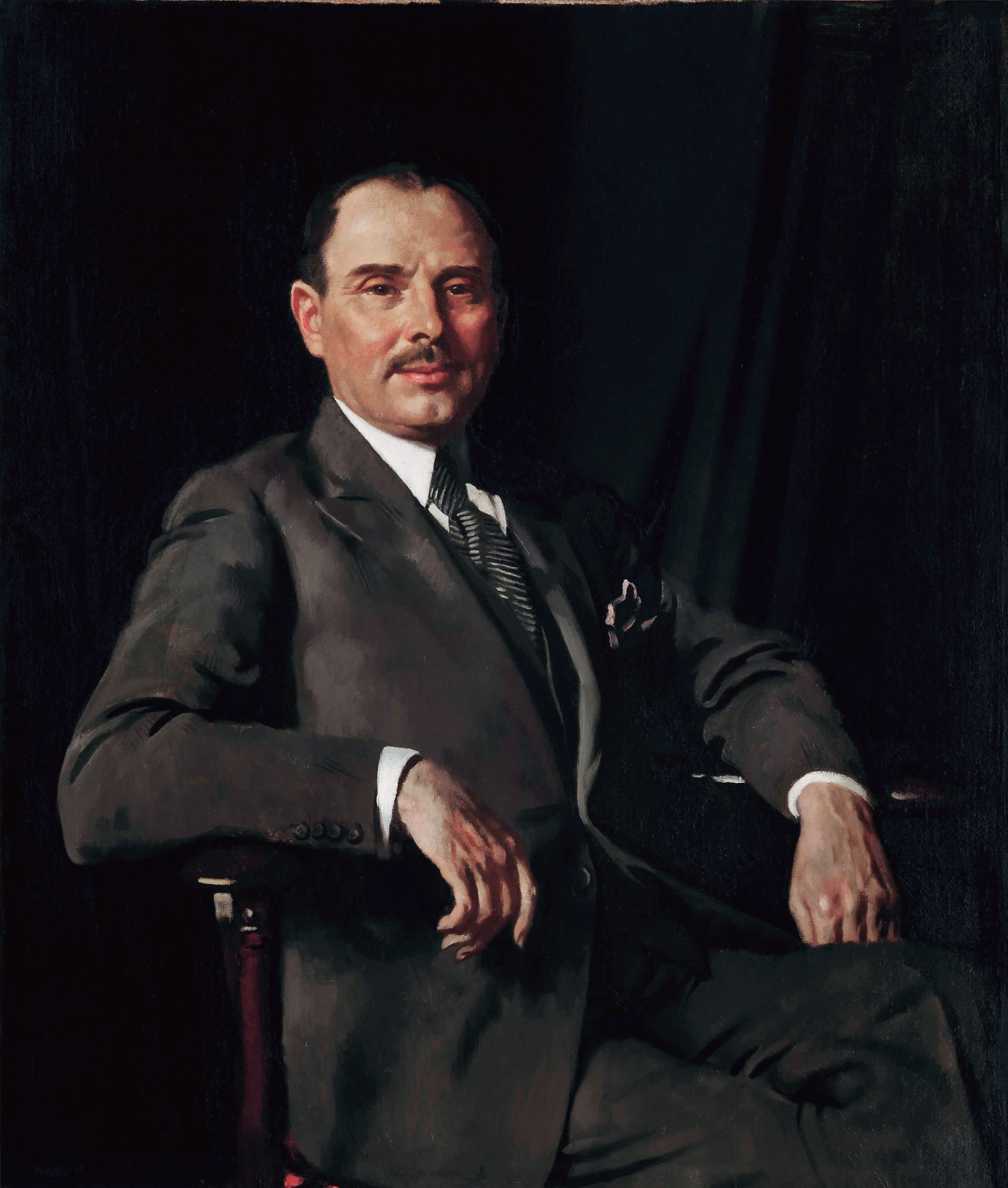
Louis Bernhard Baron (William Orpen, 1926)

Sir Louis Bernhard Baron, 1st Baronet (19 October 1876 – 6 May 1934), was a British tobacco and cigarette manufacturer. He was the managing director of the Carreras Tobacco Company.

Baron was the son of Bernhard Baron and his wife Rachel, née Schwartz. His father was Jewish and had emigrated from Russia to the US before settling in London, where he preceded his son as managing director of Carreras.

Baron was created a baronet, of Park Street in the parish of St George, Hanover Square, in the County of London, in 1930. He died in May 1934, aged 57, when the title became extinct.

== Family ==
He married Elsie, daughter of Bruno Richter of New York. They had one daughter, Myrtle Baron.

Elsie, Lady Baron (d. February 23, 1983), remarried on November 4, 1935, Arthur Robert Tritton, of Godmersham Park.

Baronetage of the United Kingdom
| New creation | Baronet (of Park Street); 1930–1934 | Extinct |
