= Oakley Square =

Garden square in Central London

Coordinates: 51°32′03″N 0°08′10″W

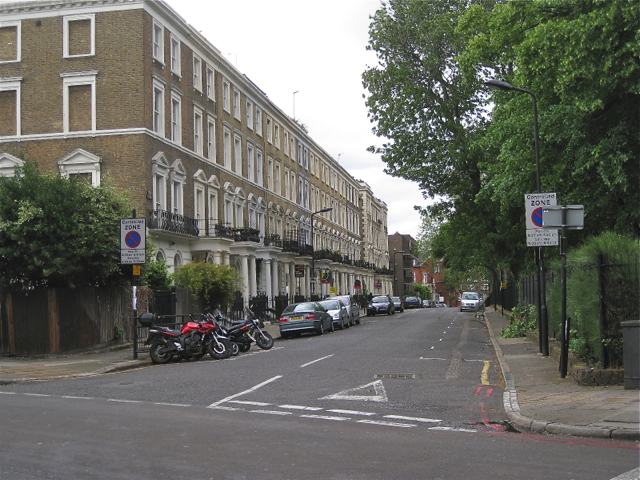
Victorian terraced housing on the square.

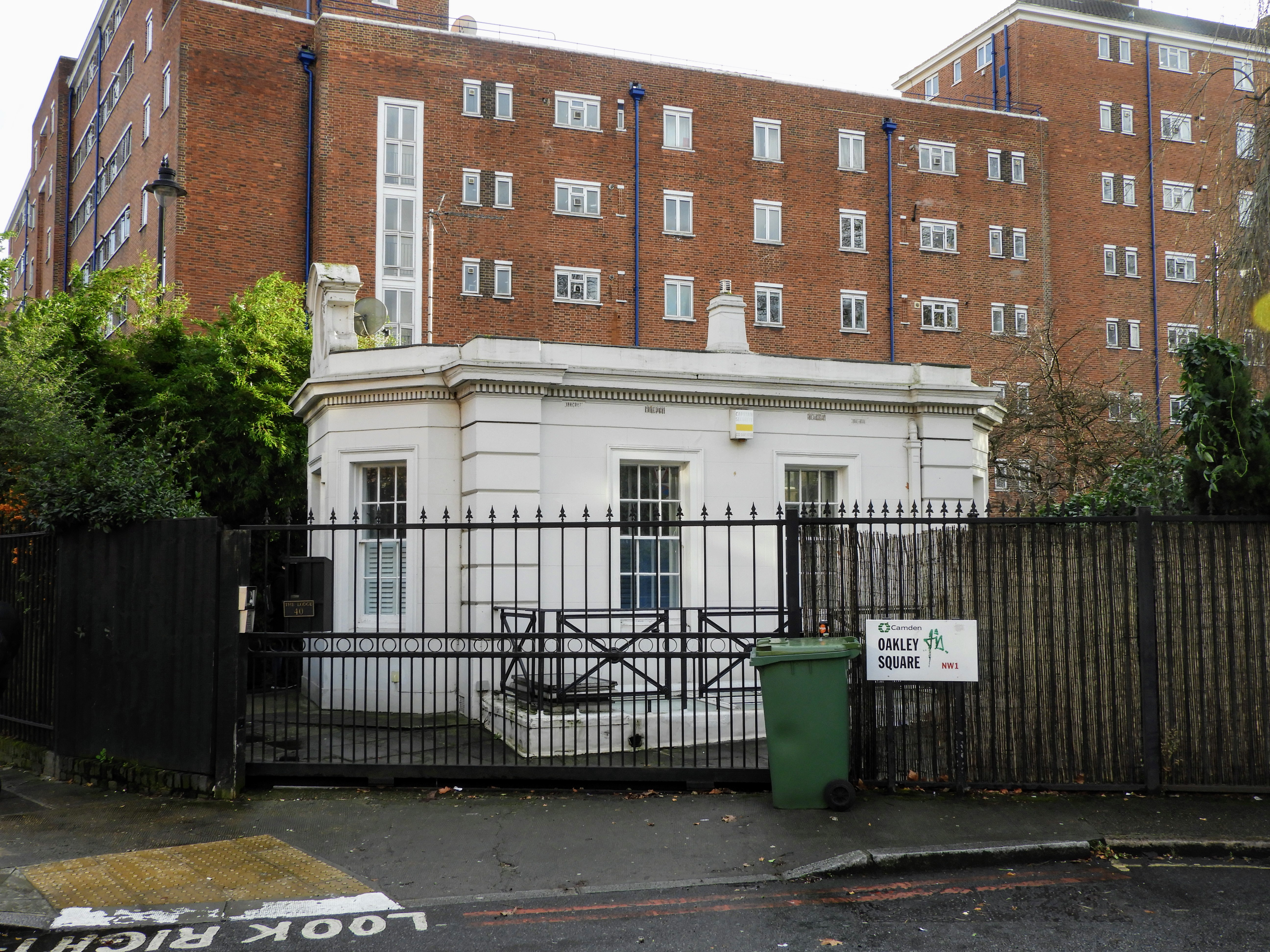
Lodge House in the square with Godwin Court in the background.

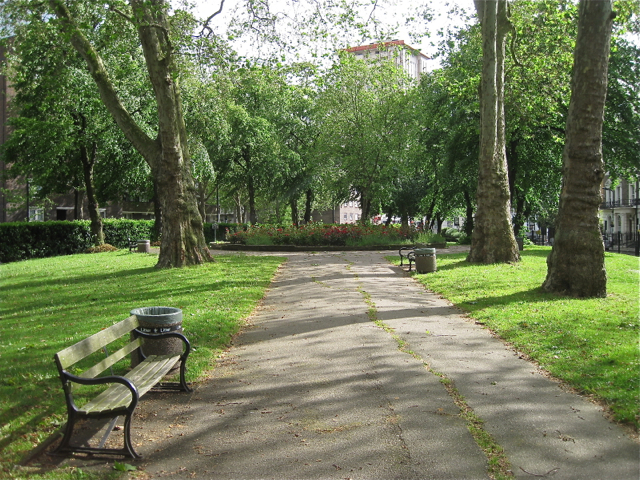
The gardens in the square's centre.

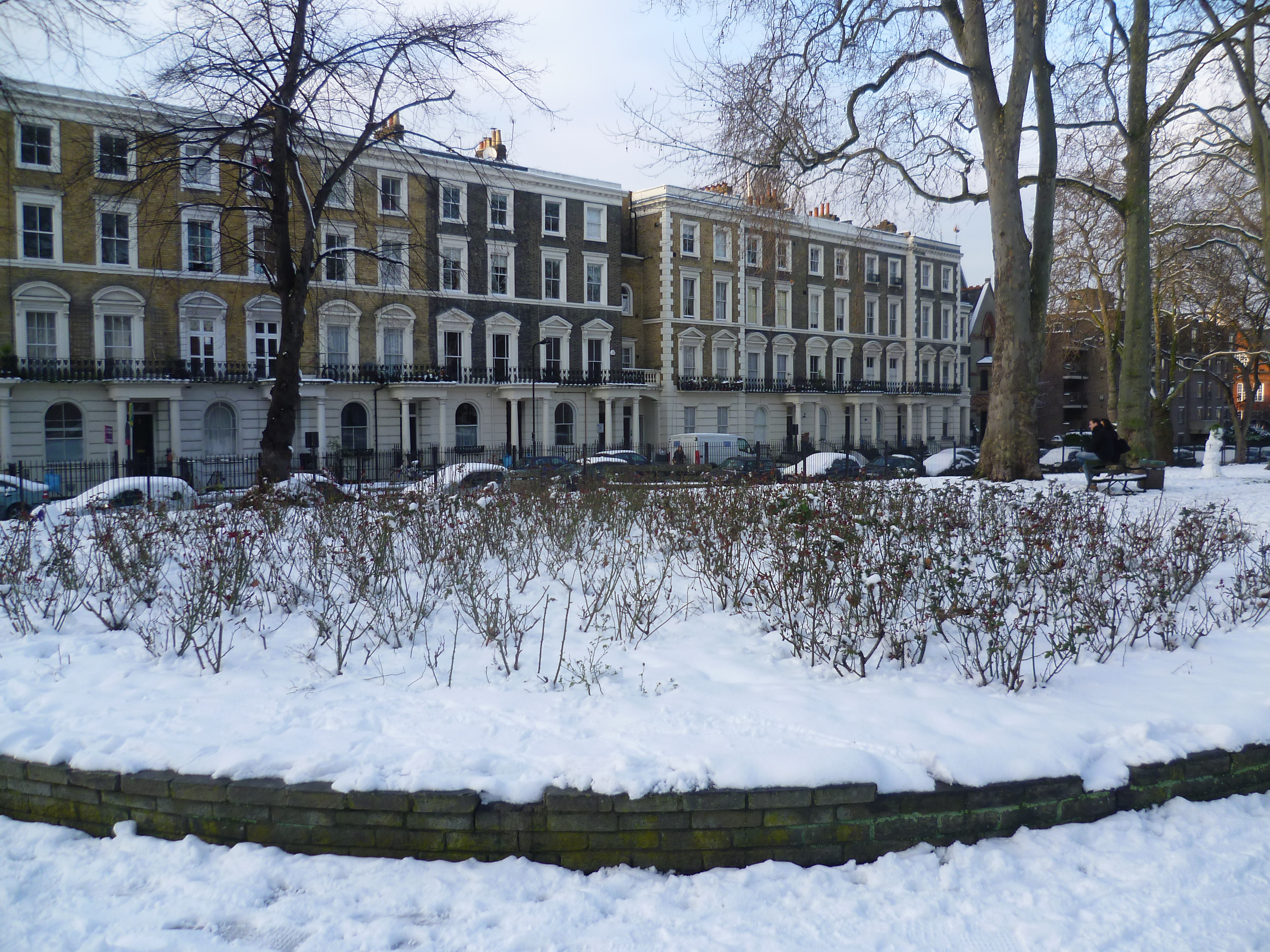
The square in winter.

Oakley Square is a crescent-shaped garden square in Somers Town in Central London, close to Mornington Crescent and Camden Town. It is located in the London Borough of Camden and runs roughly northeastwards from Eversholt Street meeting with the southern end of Camden Street on its eastern side.

It was originally part of the Bedford Estate belonging to the Dukes of Bedford, and takes its name from the village of Oakley in Bedfordshire which belonged to the family from the eighteenth century. It was laid out in the early Victorian era, later than nearby Mornington Crescent and Arlington Road and around the same time as Harrington Square. On the northern side some of the Victorian terraced housing still exists as well as the redbrick Working Men's College established in 1854. On the southern side the original buildings have been replaced by more recent developments. The Godwin Court Council apartment block was built on the east end of the square on a large bomb site, there was also a EWS (Emergency Water Supply) tank on the bomb site, Godwin Court was built after 1946. The white stucco Victorian lodge in the gardens is now Grade II listed as are a number of the houses. From 1854 the square was home to the Anglican St Matthew's Church, designed by John Johnson, but this was later deconsecrated and finally demolished in 1977, although the old vicarage still survives, which is also now Grade II listed.

== Bibliography ==
- Bebbington, Gillian. London Street Names. Batsford, 1972.
- Cockburn, J. S., King, H. P. F. & McDonnell, K. G. T. & A History of the County of Middlesex. Institute of Historical Research, 1989.
- Cherry, Bridget & Pevsner, Nikolaus. London 3: North West. Yale University Press, 2002.
- Drew, Alison. Between Empire and Revolution: A Life of Sidney Bunting, 1873–1936. Routledge, 2015.
