= Camden Collective =

- Formation: 2009
- Type: Charity
- Location: London Borough of Camden
- Parent organization: Camden Town Unlimited
- Staff: 1-10
- Website: camdencollective.co.uk

Camden Collective is a regeneration project located in the London Borough of Camden.

== History ==
The project has been run by Camden Town Unlimited, the business improvement district for Camden Town since 2009. Camden Collective carries out projects including public art, co-working spaces, pop up shops, accelerator and business support courses. The project relies on grants and raising revenue to support its activities.

== Participants ==
Notable businesses using the co-working spaces include SB.TV, Clime-it Brothers, Sudden Black and Stemettes. A Channel 4 documentary series, Bedroom to Boardroom that followed SB.TV was filmed in Camden Collective's co-working space. PayneShurvell, Amy Winehouse Foundation, Hospital Records and UK band Enter Shikari have previously used the Camden Collective pop up shops.

== Properties ==
Camden Collective re-purposes previously vacant and underused properties for its activities. The original ‘wire-less, wall-less’ Collective co-working space was designed by Dexter Moren Associates in 2009, and was located above David Roberts Art Foundation in a 19th-century converted furniture factory.

In 2013, the project opened a 3-storey retail and co-working space on Camden High Street.

From 2015 to 2017, the project used National Temperance Hospital ahead of its demolition for HS2 at Euston.

In 2017, the project opened its 19th building, a co-working space, in a TfL-owned property in Camden Town.
