= National Temperance Hospital =

- University College London Hospitals NHS Foundation Trust
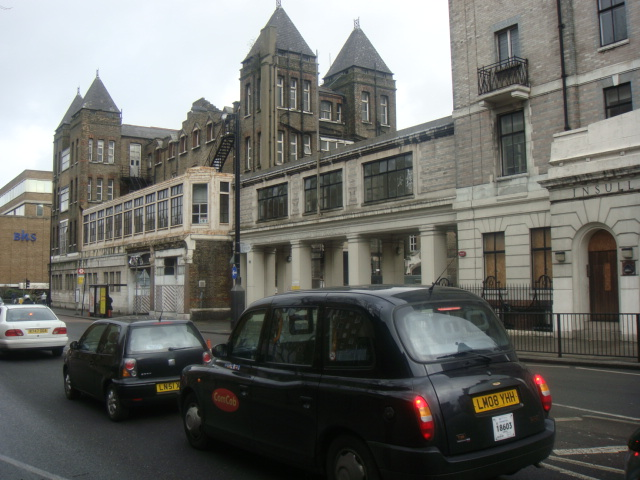
- The National Temperance Hospital, off Hampstead Road

- Location within Camden

Geography
- Location: Camden, London, England, United Kingdom
- Coordinates: 51.52871°N 0.13810°W

Organisation
- Care system: NHS England

History
- Founded: 1873
- Closed: 1990
- Demolished: 2018

Links
- Lists: Hospitals in England

The National Temperance Hospital was a hospital in Hampstead Road, London, between Mornington Crescent and Warren Street.

== History ==
The hospital opened as the London Temperance Hospital on 6 October 1873 by initiative of the National Temperance League, and was managed by a board of 12 teetotallers. Under its rules, the use of alcohol to treat patients was discouraged, but not outlawed: doctors could prescribe alcohol when they thought necessary for exceptional cases.

In 1931, Chicago magnate Samuel Insull donated $160,000 to build a new extension, the "Insull Memorial wing" which was designed in the Art Deco style by architect William Binnie.

It was renamed the National Temperance Hospital in 1932 and acquired the premises of the St Pancras Female Orphanage and Charity School, located on an adjacent site, in 1945. It was incorporated into the National Health Service in 1948 under the management of the North West Metropolitan Regional Hospital Board.

After the hospital was closed in 1990, its exterior featured in an episode of Mr. Bean, entitled "Goodnight Mr. Bean" and first broadcast in October 1995, in which Bean tailgates an ambulance and stops behind it before entering the hospital. It was briefly considered, but rejected, as a potential site for the National Institute for Medical Research between 2006 and 2007.

The building was used by Camden Collective, a regeneration initiative, from 2015 to 2017. In 2017, demolition began as part of the work necessary to clear the area for the proposed High Speed 2 railway line. Time capsules were discovered during the demolition in October 2017.
