= Prince of Wales, Euston =

Pub in Camden, London

Coordinates: 51.528079°N 0.138929°W

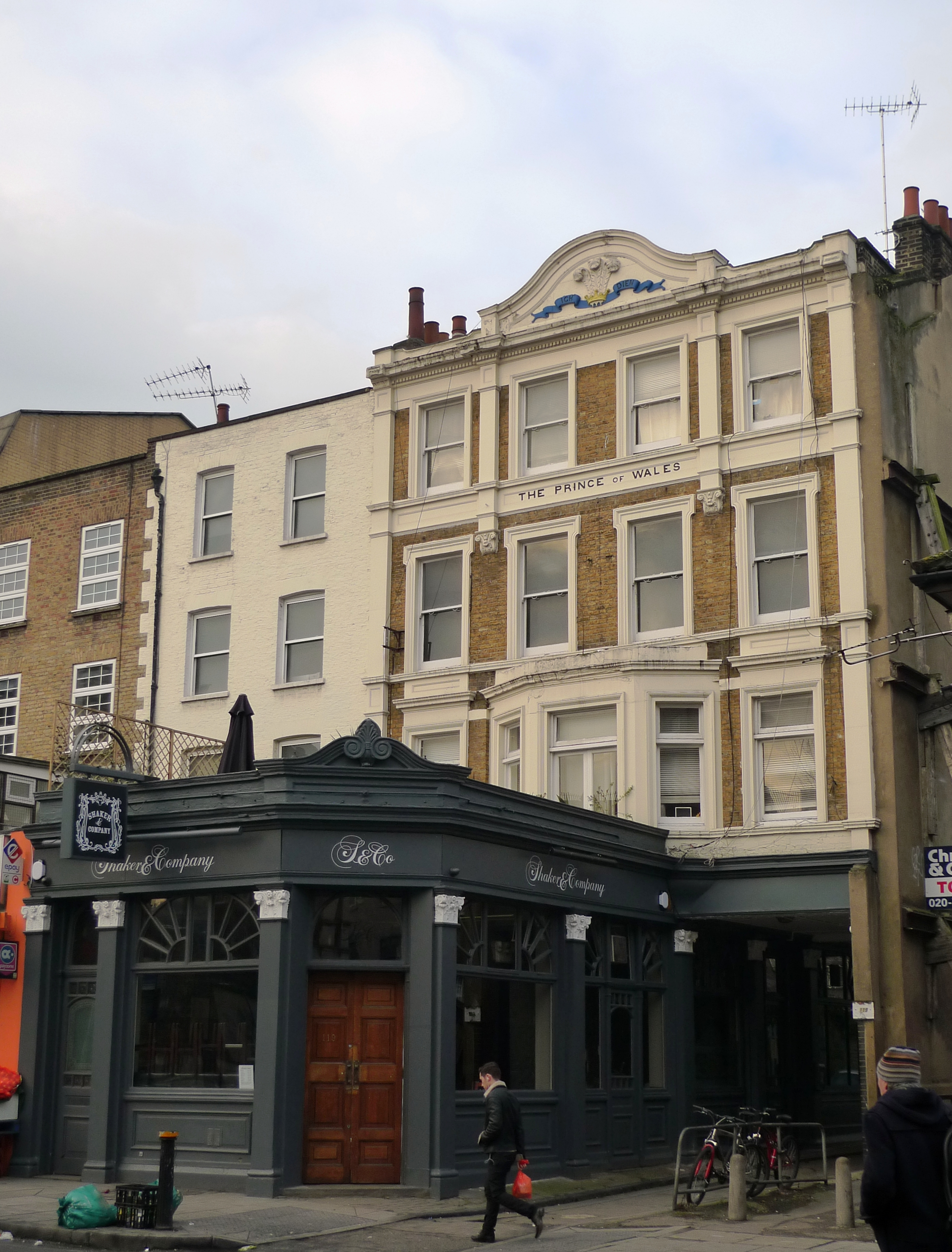
The Prince of Wales, now Shaker and Company

The Prince of Wales is a Grade II listed public house at 119 Hampstead Road, Euston, London NW1 3EE.

It was built in the mid-1860s. It was subsequently an American bar/restaurant called Positively 4th Street. It then became a cocktail bar called Shaker and Company. It is now an LGBTQ+ Bar called Zodiac.
