= Craven A =

British cigarette brand

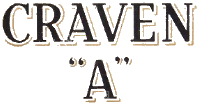
- Product type: Cigarette
- Current owner: British American Tobacco
- Produced by: Subsidiaries of British American Tobacco
- Country: United Kingdom
- Introduced: 1921; 105 years ago
- Markets: See Markets
- Previous owners: Carreras Tobacco Company, Rothmans International
- Tagline: "Will Not Affect Your Throat", "For Your Throat's Sake"

Craven A (stylized as Craven "A") is a British brand of cigarettes, currently manufactured by British American Tobacco. Originally founded and produced by the Carreras Tobacco Company in 1921 until merging with Rothmans International in 1972, who then produced the brand until Rothmans was acquired by British American Tobacco in 1999.

The cigarette brand is named after the third Earl of Craven, after the "Craven Mixture", a tobacco blend formulated for the 3rd Earl in the 1860s by tobacconist Don José Joaquin Carreras.

== History ==
After the end of World War I, the cigarette market resumed its normal competitive spirit with the Carreras Tobacco Company once more well to the fore. Bernhard Baron, a director of Carreras, knew that to compete successfully his product had to be better than his competitors' and in 1921 Carreras launched Craven "A", using the name of the 3rd Earl of Craven. Presumably its name did not refer to the customary meaning of the word 'craven' (cowardly); beyond the historic connection to the "Craven Mixture" tobacco blend, the year of release of the Craven "A" brand coincided with the well-publicised death of the 4th Earl of Craven in a yachting accident on 10 July 1921. It was the first machine-made cork-tipped cigarette, and it became a household name in over 120 countries with the slogan "Will Not Affect Your Throat".

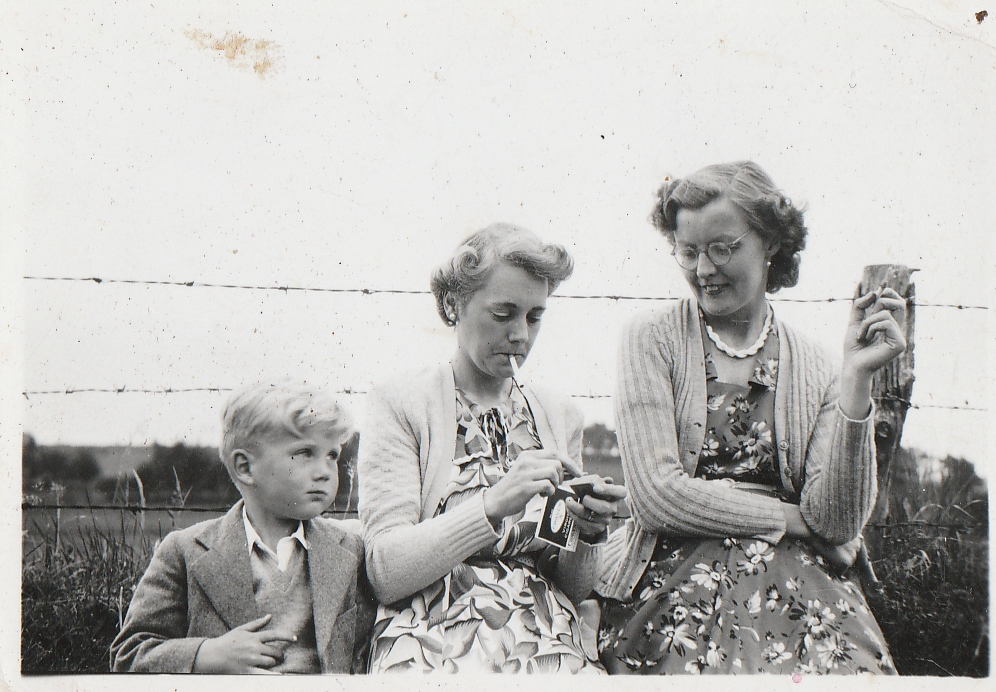
Two women in Ireland smoking Craven "A" in the 1950s

Following the success of Craven A, several other companies launched cork-tipped cigarettes which enjoyed varying degrees of success. Few (if any) of these remain available as of 2019.

At the same time as Craven A was pioneering a new fashion in cigarette smoking, the competition was moving in on the coupon business. Carreras participated in this market with their Black Cat brand.

The brand was widely used in World War II not only by British soldiers, but in general. Craven A was one of several brands donated by tobacco manufacturers to soldiers' rations in the hope of developing ongoing brand loyalty.

Also during the Second World War, General Charles de Gaulle, in exile in London, had difficulties in obtaining his usual French brown cigarettes brand Gitanes. Consequently, he started smoking Craven A and apparently took a liking to the blonde tobacco, which until then had been rare in occupied France.

Muhammad Ali Jinnah, the founder of Pakistan, chain-smoked fifty Craven A cigarettes a day, even while terminally ill with tuberculosis.

== Advertising ==
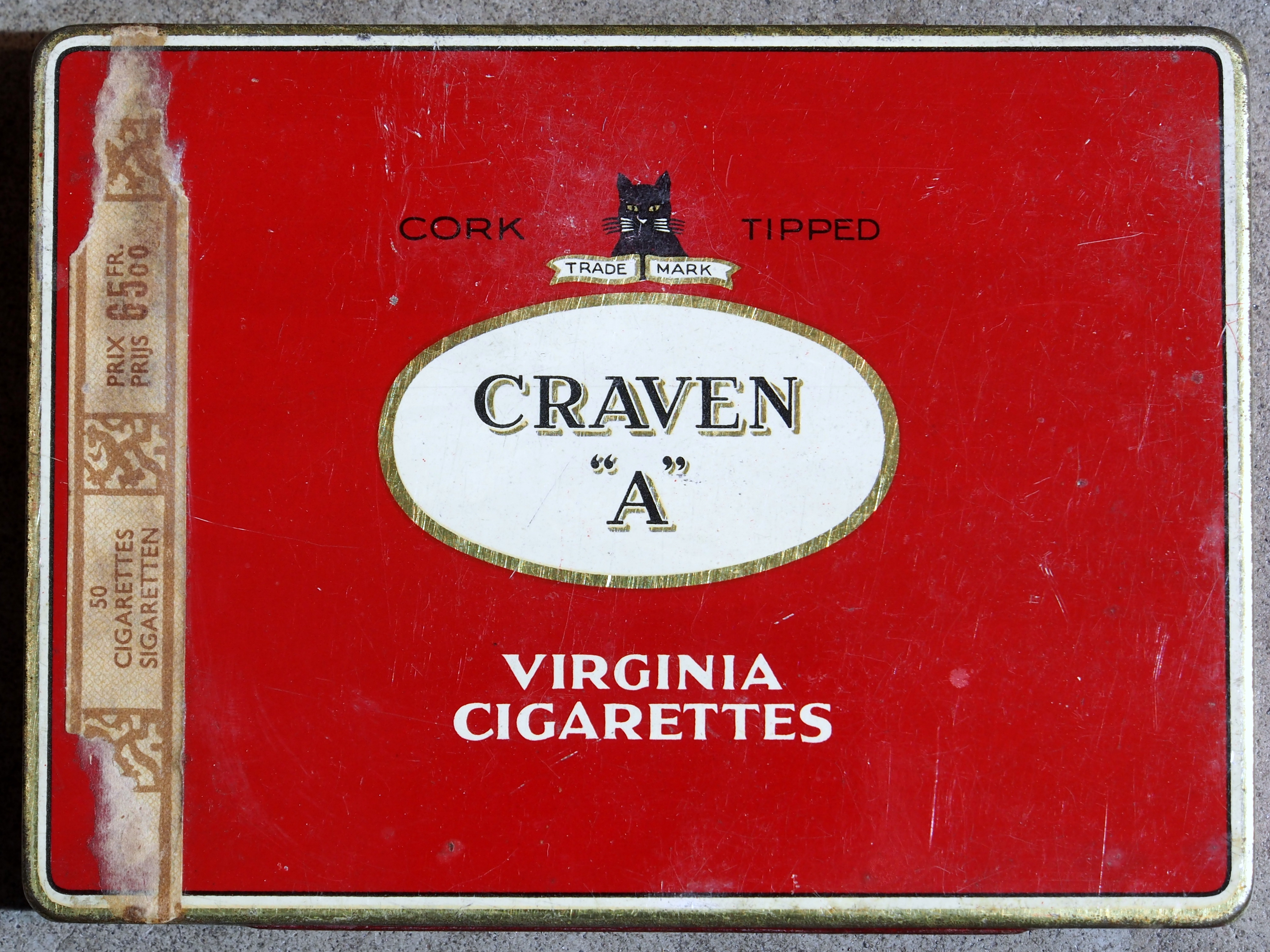
Belgian tin of Craven A

Craven 'A' started using the slogan "For Your Throat's Sake" around 1939. It had a famous slogan, "Will Not Affect Your Throat".

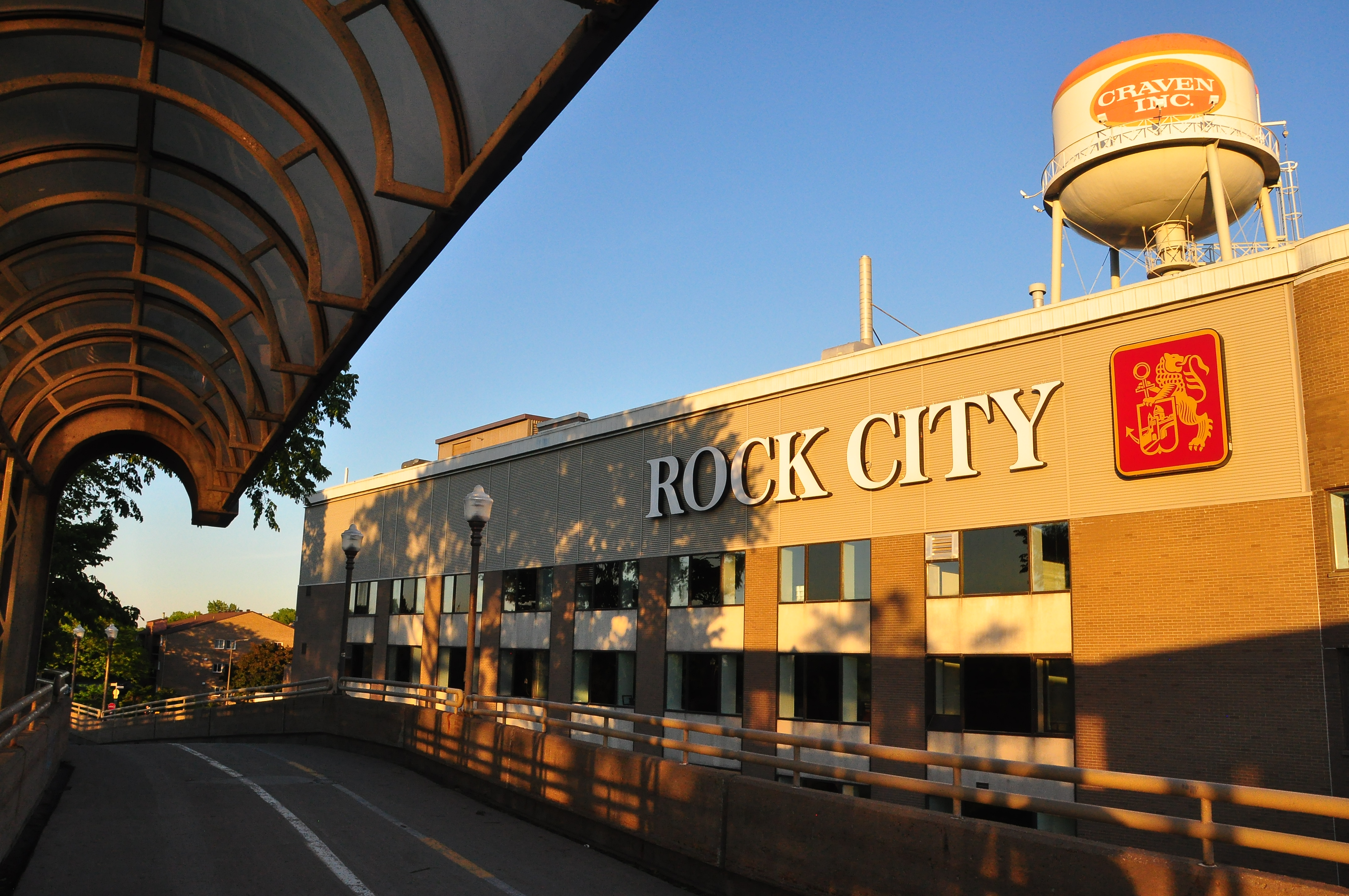
Rothmans, Benson & Hedges plant in Quebec City, Canada

Many advertising posters were made to promote Craven 'A' cigarettes.

== Counterfeiting ==
In May 2014, Carreras Limited warned that counterfeit Craven A cigarettes were being sold in Jamaica. The counterfeits were said to be non-compliant with Jamaican Public Health labelling regulations.

== Markets ==
Craven 'A' were or still are sold in the following countries: Canada, United States, Jamaica, United Kingdom, Germany, Greece, France, Austria, Italy, Ireland, Cyprus, Ivory Coast, South Africa, Palestine, Vietnam, Malaysia, China, Taiwan, Hong Kong and Australia.

== Sponsorship ==
The company sponsored the 1981 Craven Mild Cup Rugby League tournament in New South Wales, Australia. Craven 'A' sponsored events in Canada such as the "Just for Laughs" Canadian Comedy Tour in March 1999. The company was also a long-time sponsor of Australian racing driver Allan Grice.

== In popular culture ==
=== Novels ===
The Character, Simon Doyle, responds, 'only Craven "A,"' (25:17) when Poirot asks if his fiancé smokes in the 1978 John Guillermin (film), "Death on the Nile."

Craven 'A' cigarettes appeared in the James Bond novel Dr. No.

Shanghai beggars in J.G Ballard's novel Empire of the Sun are described as 'shaking their Craven A tins like reformed smokers.'

Craven 'A' cigarettes are mentioned in Patricia Highsmith's novel The Price of Salt, where they are smoked by Carol, one of the main characters. They are not shown in the 2015 film of the novel.

Craven 'A' cigarettes are also mentioned in the Irish author Benjamin Black's mystery book "Even the Dead", where they are smoked by Lisa Smith, a young lady in distress. Quote from the book:'She opened her handbag and took out a packet of Craven A and a box of matches.'

Craven ‘A’ cigarettes were also the cigarettes of choice for the father of Pakistan, Muhammad Ali Jinnah, as mentioned in the book by his younger sister, Fatima Jinnah.

Craven ‘A’ cigarettes are the subject of a memorandum made by George Orwell to himself, in his published diaries, of detail to incorporate in a potential future novel. The diary entry for 3 February 1936 recounts a visit to Rudyard Lake in Staffordshire, England, which was part-frozen at the time. The sound being made by the ice as it is rocked by the wind is described by Orwell as "the most melancholy noise I ever heard". He writes: "[Memorandum] to use in novel some time and to have an empty Craven A packet bobbing up and down among the ice."

=== Music ===
The name of this brand is taken anecdotally in the song Les Bêtises by Sabine Paturel and in "Le Chien" by Léo Ferré. The name "Craven A" is also included in the song "Tendresse et amitié" by Robert Charlebois and the text is written by Réjean Ducharme. The brand is also mentioned in the 1982 song Lost Mi Love by Yellowman.

=== Films ===
According to his biographer, the French actor Jean Gabin was a regular smoker of filterless Craven A, which he alternated with Gitanes. In the film Pasha, a package of Craven A is visible on the desk of "Commissioner Louis Joss", Gabin, as well as in Le cave se rebiffe.

In the 1978 film Death on the Nile, Simon Doyle is asked by Monsieur Poirot if his fiancée, the wealthy heiress Linnet Ridgeway, smokes, to which he responds "Just Craven 'A'".

In the 1983 film, "An Englishman Abroad," the leading actor, Alan Bates, recites the Craven A tagline (Craven A, for your throat's sake).

== See also ==
- Tobacco smoking
