= St Pancras Female Orphanage =

Former female orphanage in London

Coordinates: 51.5282°N 0.1384°W

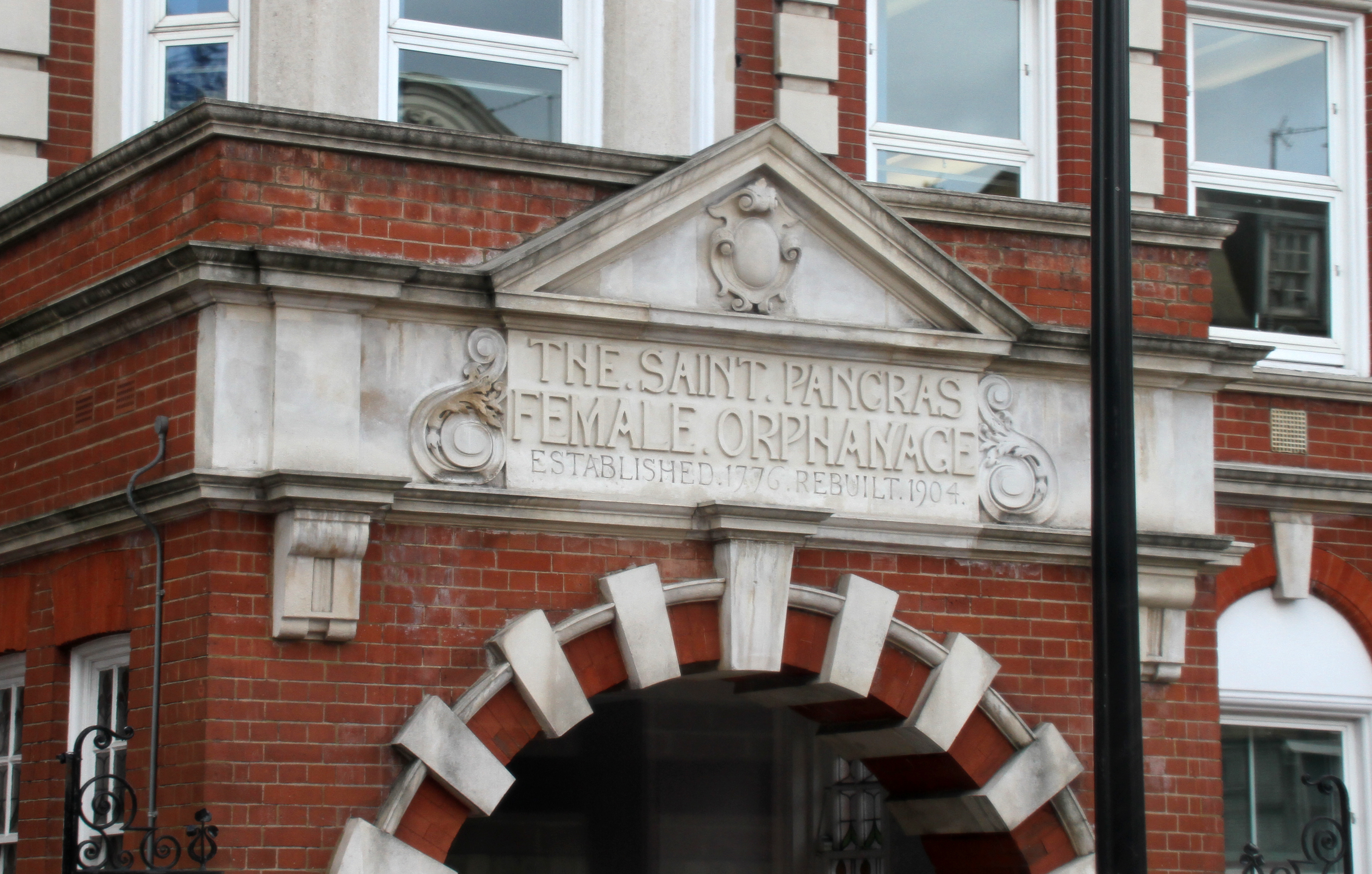
St Pancras Female Orphanage

The St Pancras Female Orphanage is a former orphanage in Somers Town, London. It was later converted to a health facility and was used as an annex to the National Temperance Hospital.

== History ==
The orphanage was established to care for female orphans in the local area in 1776. It was located in Hampstead Road where the foundation stone for premises completely rebuilt to a design by E. W. Hudson was laid by Lord Southampton on 28 January 1904.

After the trustees of the orphanage vacated the building, the former orphanage was acquired by the National Temperance Hospital for use as an annex in 1945. The ground floor was subsequently converted for medical use. Following the closure of the National Temperance Hospital in 1990, the former orphanage became the home of the Margarete Centre which provides support to sufferers of substance abuse.

The archives of the orphanage are now held at the Highgate Literary and Scientific Institution.
