= Chalk Farm Road =

Street in Camden Town, London

Coordinates: 51°32′34″N 0°08′56″W

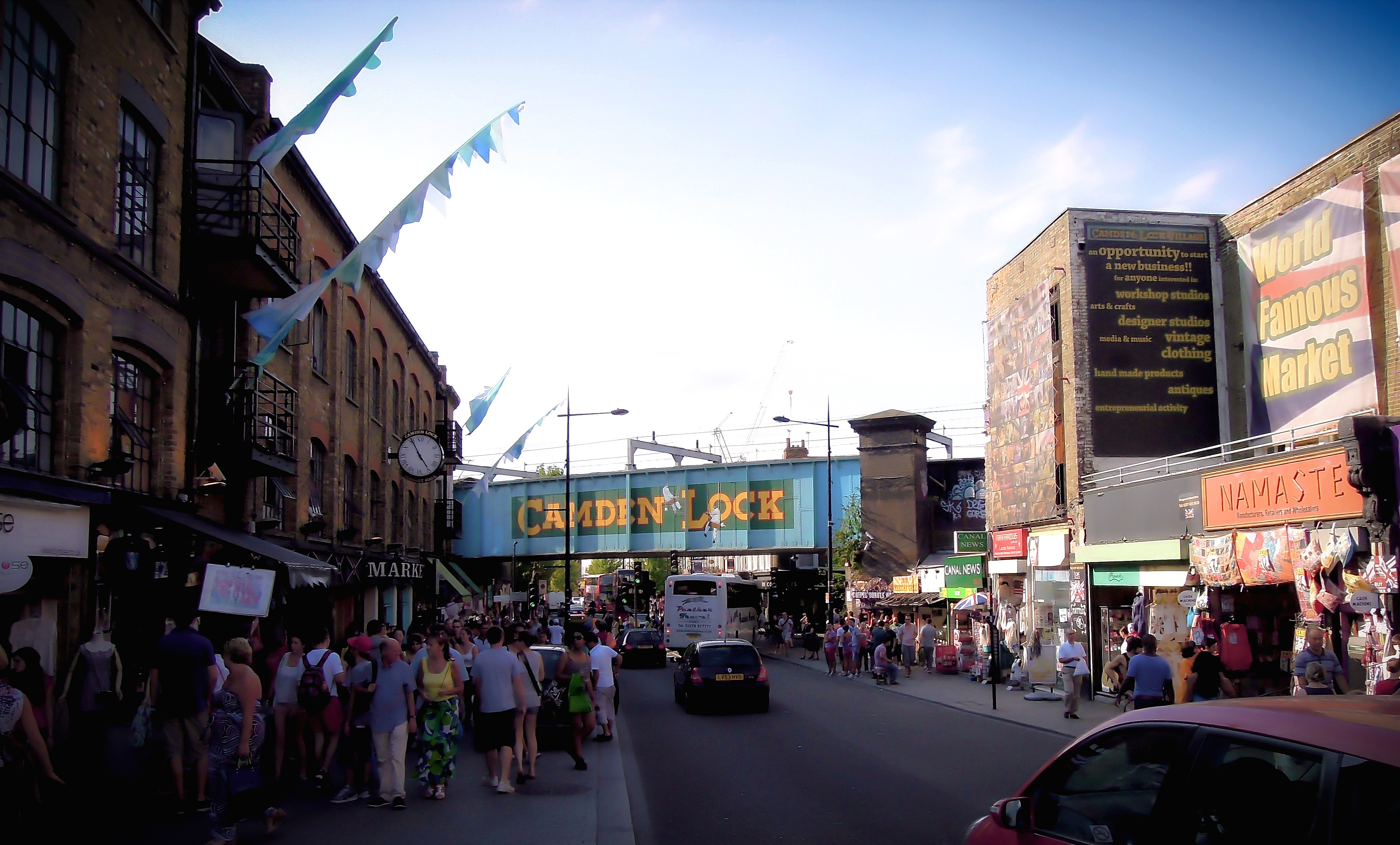
Camden Lock Railway Bridge, London, August 2012

Chalk Farm Road is a street in the Camden Town area of London. There is a widespread misapprehension that the road that runs through Camden Market is part of Camden High Street, but it is actually Chalk Farm Road. Camden Market is a major centre for the retailing of street fashions and other goods targeted at teenagers and young adults, and Chalk Farm Road has an alternative culture atmosphere.

The street is part of the route from central London to Hampstead. It is a continuation of Camden High Street, and begins at the Bridge over Regent's Canal. Chalk Farm underground station, on the Northern line, is at the northern end.

Entertainment venues in Chalk Farm Road include The Roundhouse, which occupies a former railway shed. Pink Floyd played the first ever show there in 1966 and it was the venue for the only UK gig by The Doors.
