= A400 road (Great Britain) =

Road in London

A400

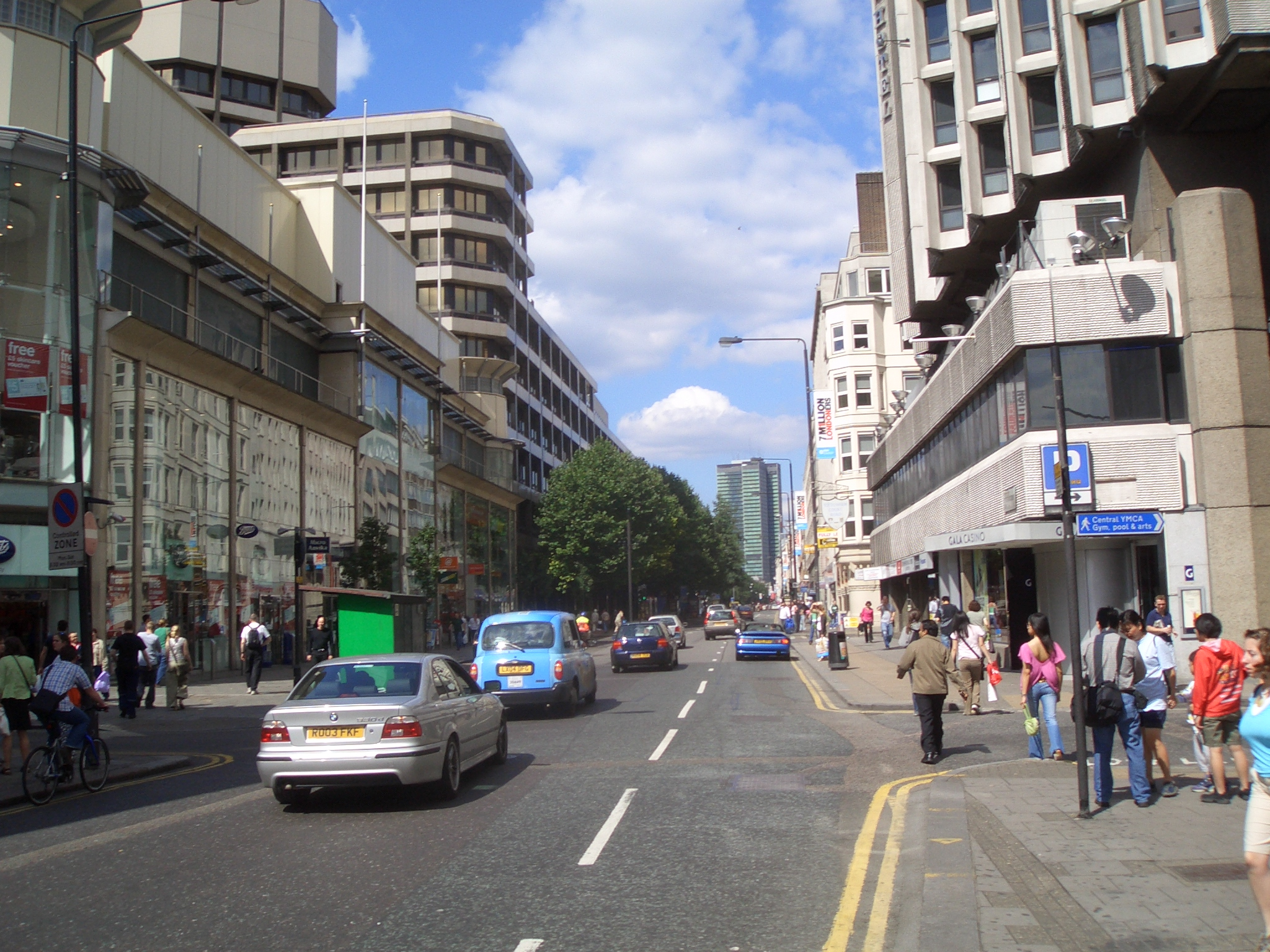
- Tottenham Court Road is part of the A400 (northbound)

Major junctions
- South end: Charing Cross
- North end: Archway, A1

Location
- Country: United Kingdom
- Primary destinations: Central London (West End); Euston; Camden Town

Road network
- Roads in the United Kingdom; Motorways; A and B road zones

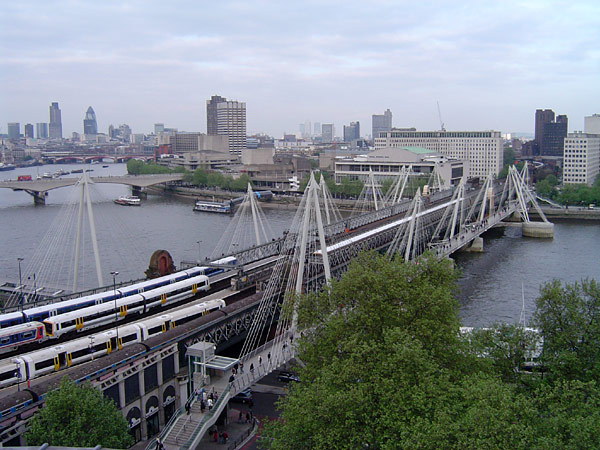
Hungerford Bridge is at the southern terminus of the A400, where traffic meets the Victoria Embankment and Cycle Superhighway 3.

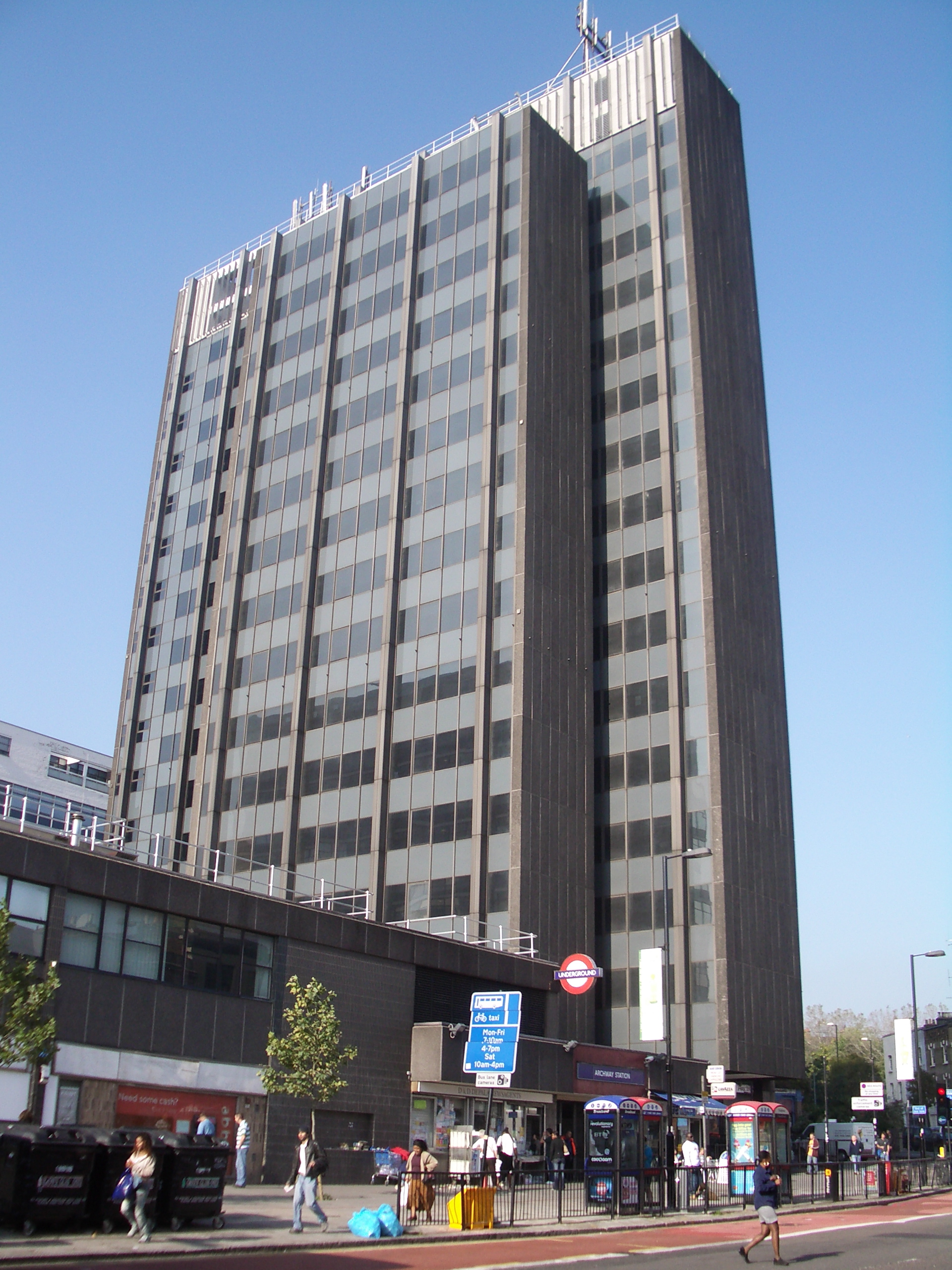
The Archway Tower, at the northern end of the A400

The A400 road is an A road in London that runs from Charing Cross (near Trafalgar Square, in London's West End) to Archway in North London. It passes some of London's most famous landmarks.

The Northern line (Charing Cross and High Barnet branches) runs beneath the A400 between Charing Cross and Archway stations. Between Charing Cross and Euston Road (Inner Ring Road), the road is in the London Congestion Charge zone.

== Route ==
=== City of Westminster ===
At its southern end, the A400 begins in the City of Westminster at a junction with the Victoria Embankment, opposite the Hungerford (Charing Cross) Bridge. There is no vehicular access to the bridge, which provides pedestrians with a route over the River Thames to the South Bank. At the junction, a separate set of traffic lights is provided for cyclists, who may cross between the A400 and Cycle Superhighway 3 with little conflict with other road traffic. Embankment tube station is to the north of the junction.

The route runs westbound along Northumberland Avenue towards Trafalgar Square. Here the route meets Whitehall, the A4 (Strand/Cockspur Street), and the Mall. The A400 travels north from Trafalgar Square along St. Martin's Place and Charing Cross Road.

The route meets the A401 (Shaftesbury Avenue) at Cambridge Circus, after which the route continues northwards to Tottenham Court Road station, where it meets Oxford Street (the A40). Here, the road enters the London Borough of Camden.

=== London Borough of Camden ===
From the tube station, the route runs northwards along Tottenham Court Road to Warren Street tube station, where it meets the London Inner Ring Road (Euston Road). Southbound traffic is carried along Gower Street, then along Shaftesbury Avenue to Cambridge Circus, to continue southbound along Charing Cross Road.

After Warren Street station, the A400 becomes a dual carriageway, part-way along Hampstead Road, as it passes through Somers Town. Hampstead Road's northern terminus is at Mornington Crescent tube station, and northbound A400 traffic travels along Camden High Street to the Britannia Junction. At the Britannia Junction, the A400 bears north-east onto Kentish Town Road. Camden High Street becomes the A502 towards Hampstead, whilst traffic may turn right onto the A503 (Camden Road).

Southbound traffic through Camden Town leaves Kentish Town Road near Camden Gardens. Traffic travels south along Camden Street, along which it meets the A503 (Camden Road) and the A4200 (Eversholt Street). Southbound traffic joins Hampstead Road to the south of Mornington Crescent tube station.

Continuing north, the A400 passes through Kentish Town. It then continues along Fortess Road towards Tufnell Park.

In the London Borough of Camden, the A400 is controlled by Transport for London between Euston and Camden Town tube station. This section of the road is a "Red Route".

=== London Borough of Islington ===
The route enters the London Borough of Islington and becomes Junction Road between Tufnell Park and Archway, before it meets the A1.

== Landmarks ==
- Embankment tube station
- Charing Cross station
- Trafalgar Square
- Halfway to Heaven
- St Martin's in the Fields
- National Gallery
- National Portrait Gallery
- Garrick Theatre
- Leicester Square tube station
- London Hippodrome
- Cambridge Circus
- Foyles
- G-A-Y
- Tottenham Court Road station
- Centre Point
- Dominion Theatre
- Bedford Square
- British Museum
- Goodge Street tube station
- BT Tower
- London School of Hygiene and Tropical Medicine
- University College London
- Euston Square tube station
- Warren Street tube station
- Euston Tower
- Mornington Crescent tube station
- KOKO
- All Saints Cathedral, Camden Street
- Camden Town tube station
- Kentish Town station
- Tufnell Park tube station
- Archway tube station

== Air pollution ==
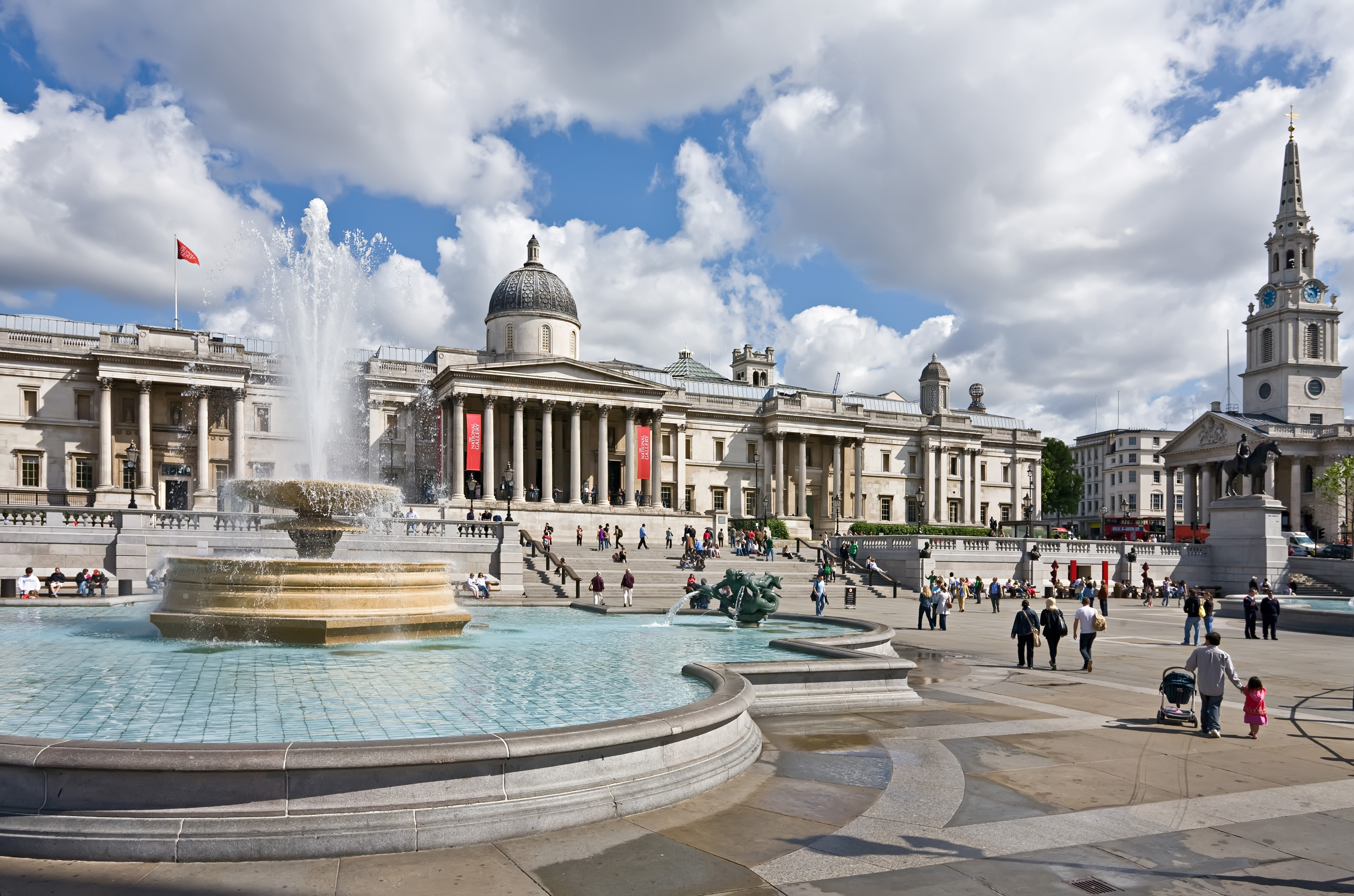
The A400 passes Trafalgar Square.

Air pollution along the A400 varies. Air pollution is monitored by the City of Westminster, the London Borough of Camden, and the London Borough of Islington. Levels of Nitrogen dioxide (NO_{2}) sometimes exceed the Air Quality Objective, set by the UK Department for Environment, Food, and Rural Affairs (Defra) at 40 micrograms per metres cubed (μg/m^{3}). Exposure to high levels of NO_{2} can lead to respiratory problems, and the gases sometimes inflame the lining of the lungs, reducing immunity to lung infections.

In the City of Westminster, there is a nearby NO_{2} monitoring point entitled Oxford Street East. In 2018, levels of NO_{2} failed to meet the Air Quality Objective, with the monitoring point recording an annual mean of 76 μg/m^{3}.

In the London Borough of Camden, levels of NO_{2} are monitored in several locations in close proximity to the A400. Results from 2018 include:

- Bloomsbury - 36 μg/m^{3}
- Tottenham Court Road - 65.7 μg/m^{3}
- Euston Road - 82.34 μg/m^{3}
- Kentish Town Road - 54.7 μg/m^{3}

In the London Borough of Islington, a monitoring point along Junction Road recorded an annual mean 36 μg/m^3 in 2018, down from 42 μg/m^{3} in 2017.

== Hampstead Road ==
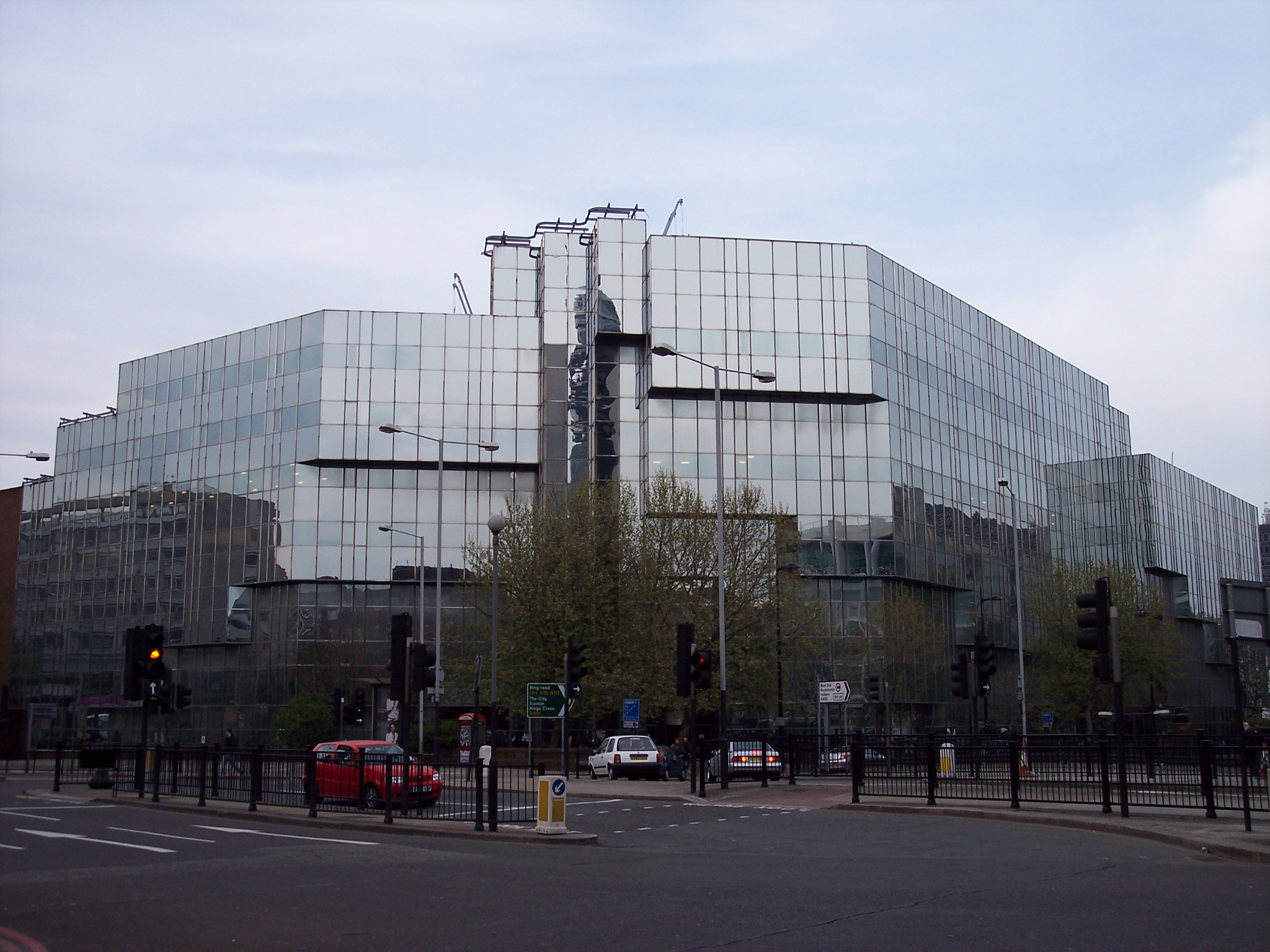
The UCH Education Centre, at the southern end of Hampstead Road, at the junction with Euston Road.

Hampstead Road is a road in London, England, stretching over a kilometre between Bloomsbury and Camden Town. It is signed as the A400. Hampstead Road terminates at Euston Road in the south, where it continues as Tottenham Court Road and (via a slip road) Gower Street. In the north, at Mornington Crescent, Hampstead Road becomes Camden High Street.

For most of its length, Hampstead Road is sandwiched between Regent's Park Estate to the west and Euston railway station to its east. In addition, from south to north on Hampstead Road are Euston Tower, the Camden People's Theatre, Drummond Street, the former Maria Fidelis Roman Catholic Convent School (recently relocated due to HS2), the Prince of Wales pub, the St Pancras Female Orphanage, and the High Speed 2 terminus under construction at Euston (formerly site of the National Temperance Hospital).

Hampstead Road then crosses the West Coast Main Line, before forming the western boundary of the Ampthill Square Estate and the western side of Harrington Square, passing on the left the Carreras Building, and on the right Mornington Crescent tube station, then joining Camden High Street at the statue of Richard Cobden.

Hampstead Road used to run north to Hampstead, but has been renamed everywhere north of Mornington Crescent. Nonetheless, it still gave its name to Hampstead Road Locks and the original name of Primrose Hill railway station, which are both on the former part of Hampstead Road now called Chalk Farm Road.

Numbers 261–263, the Prince of Wales pub at number 119, Mornington Crescent tube station, and the statue of Richard Cobden are all grade II listed buildings.

== Camden High Street ==
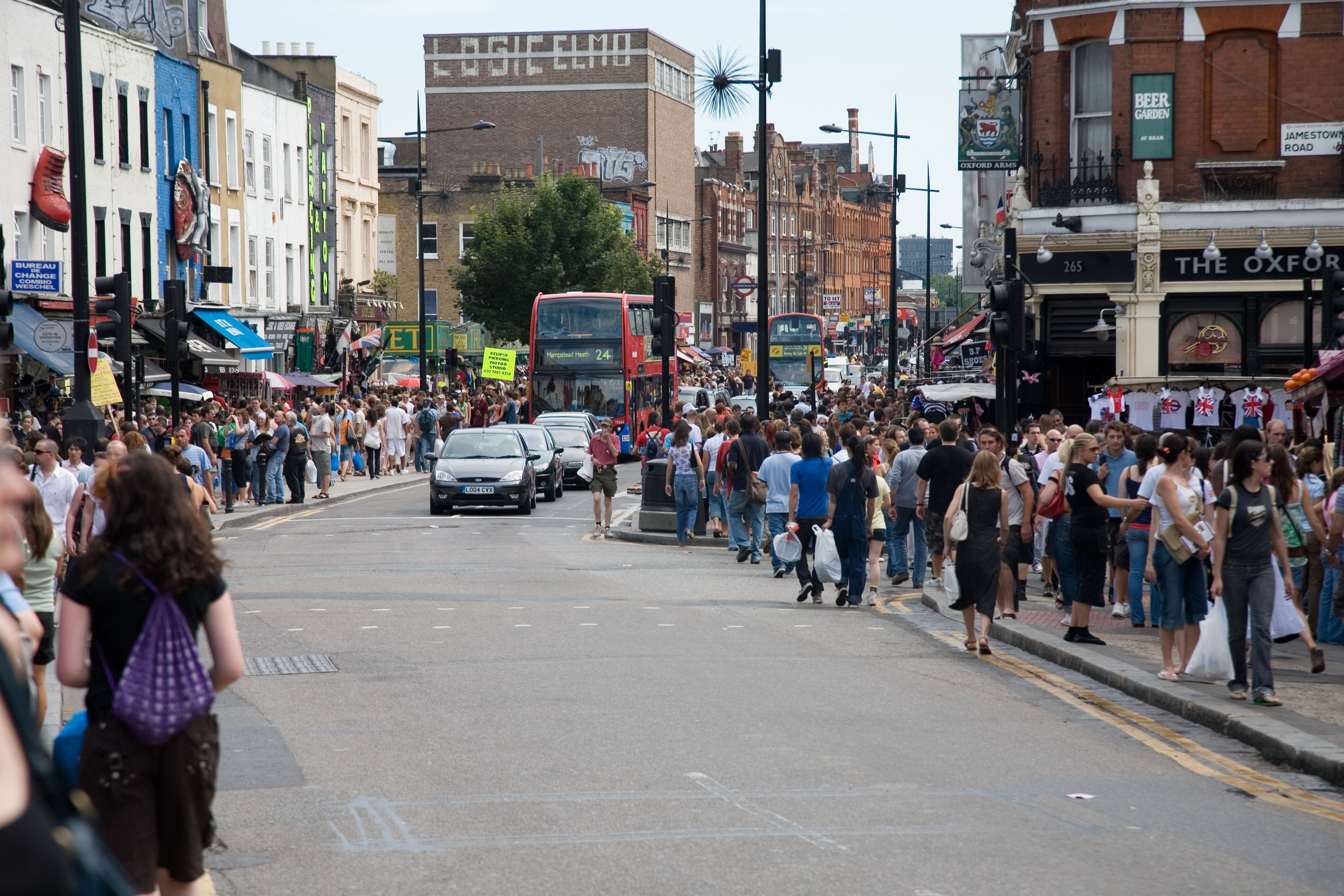
Camden High Street near Camden Town tube station

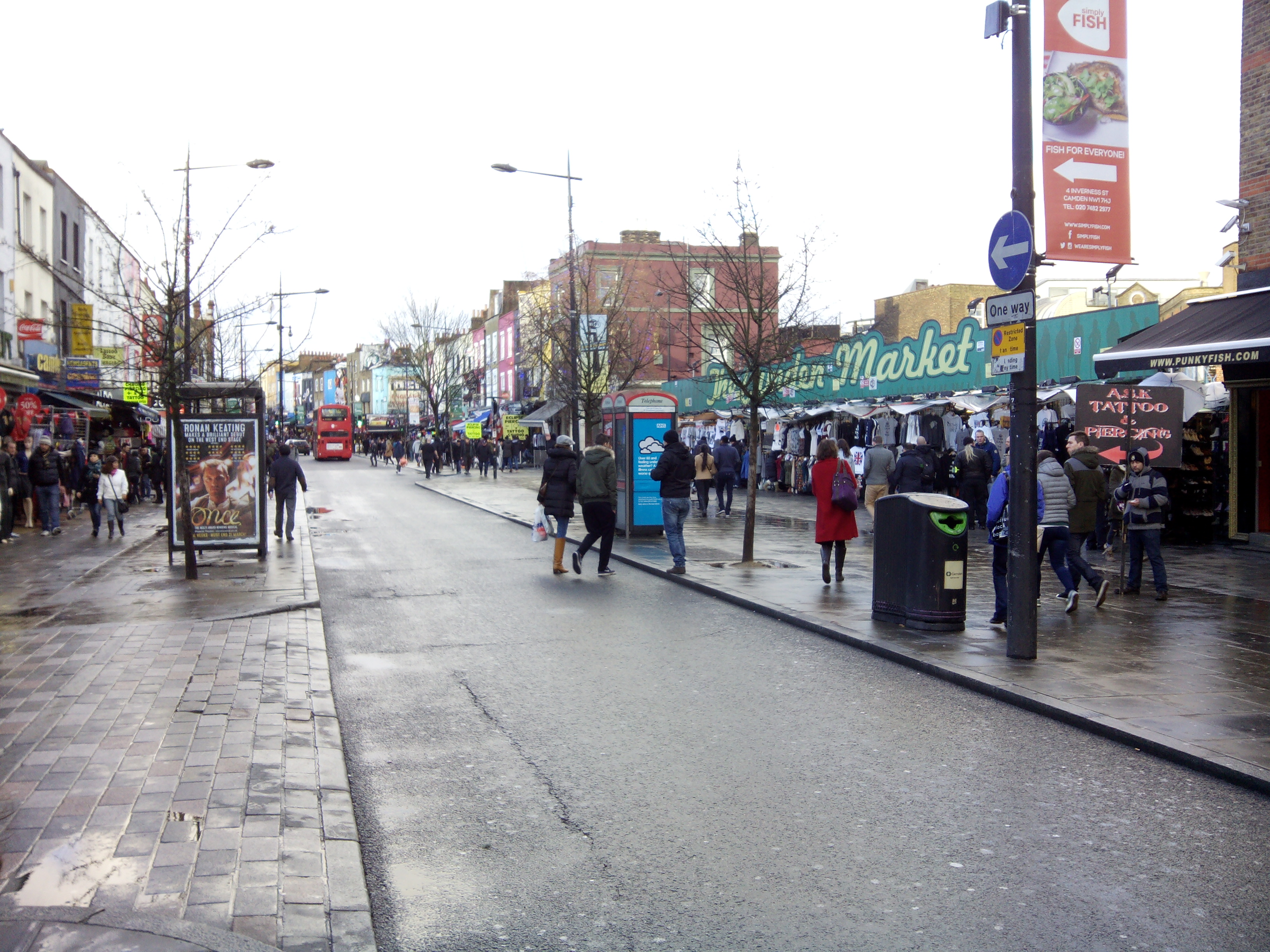
Camden High Street. January 2015

Camden High Street is a short stretch of road (about 900m long, mostly forming part of the A400) in Camden Town, in north-northwest London. It is part of the route from central London to Hampstead. It is the local high street and features major music venues at either end (KOKO, the former Camden Palace, at the southern end and the bridge over Regent's Canal at the northern end).

It is a one-way street only allowing vehicular traffic to travel northwards (southbound traffic uses the parallel Camden Street). Travelling north, traffic emerges from Hampstead Road (A400) into the High Street at the junction with Eversholt Street, by Mornington Crescent Underground station.

The northern extremity of Camden High Street lies at a bridge over Regent's Canal where the road turns Chalk Farm Road, into the southern end Kentish Town Road (where the A400 continues) and Camden Road. Camden Town Underground station is on the corner between Camden High Street and Kentish Town Road.

== Junction Road ==
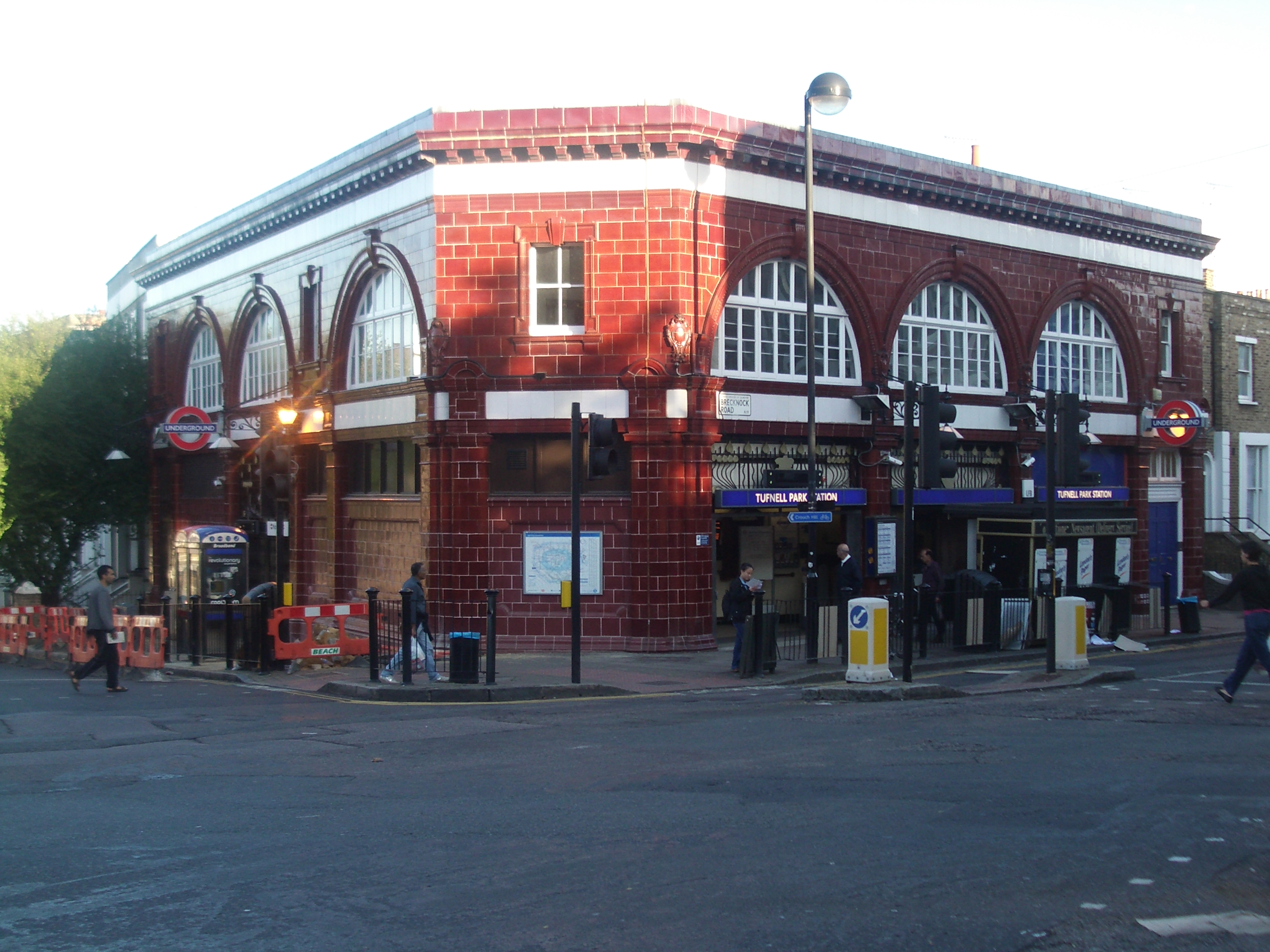
Tufnell Park tube station on Junction Road.

Junction Road is a section of the A400 road in Upper Holloway, north London, running between Archway tube station (at the top of Holloway Road) and Tufnell Park tube station (where the A400 continues southwards as Fortess Road).

The street has a number of restaurants, bars and pubs. Junction Road is home to Archway Tower, a building whose appearance is divisive and there is debate as to whether it should be demolished. However, the tower was remodelled in the 2010s with new cladding providing a more modern appearance.

Junction Road railway station stood on the corner of Junction Road and Station Road until its closure in 1943. It was on what is now London Overground's Gospel Oak to Barking line, between Gospel Oak station and Upper Holloway station.

The postal district is N19.
