= Harrington Square =

Garden square in Central London

- Interactive map of Harrington Square
- Type: Garden square
- Location: London, NW1; United Kingdom
- Coordinates: 51°31′59″N 0°8′20″W
- Area: 0.5 hectares (1.2 acres)
- Created: 1843
- Public transit: Mornington Crescent

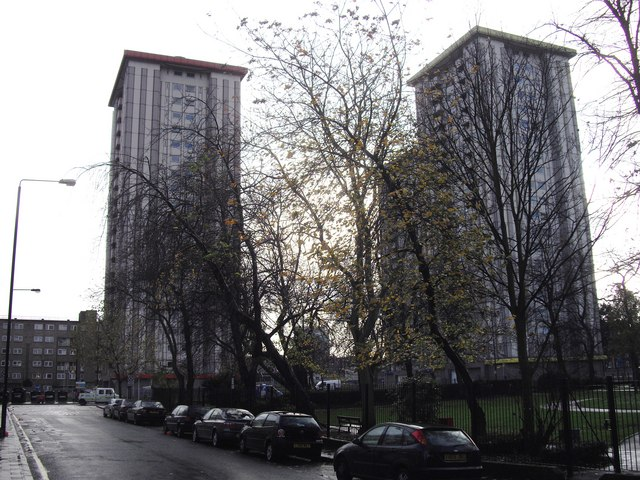
The Ampthill Square Estate as pictured from Harrington Square.

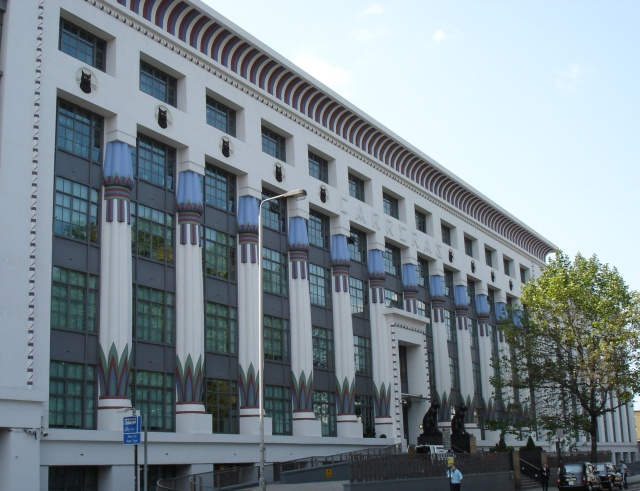
The Carreras Cigarette Factory as pictured from Harrington Square.

Harrington Square is a garden square in the Camden Town area of London, England. It is located at the northern end of Hampstead Road and next to Mornington Crescent tube station.

Despite its name, Harrington Square is a triangle, bordered to the west by Hampstead Road and bordered to the north-east by south by properties addressed as 'Harrington Square' itself. In the middle is Harrington Square Gardens which is a public green space. Numbers 15 to 24, which form the entirety of the north-eastern side except Hurdwick House, are grade II listed buildings. The south side of the square is dominated by the Ampthill Square Estate.

The square was laid out in 1843 as part of the Bedford Estate. Soon after being built, it was home to William Mudford and to Margaret Oliphant. Alexander Graham Bell lived in Harrington Square with his grandfather when a teenager, in what Bell called "the turning point of my whole career". Oliver Lodge lived in the square.

Harrington Square was originally part of a pair of squares, with Mornington Crescent Gardens on the other side of Hampstead Road, but Mornington Crescent Gardens were built on to create the Carreras Cigarette Factory, which fronts on to Harrington Square, in the 1920s. The south side of the square originally had terraces similar to the listed north-eastern side, but was bombed in World War II and replaced by the modern Ampthill Square Estate.

Harrington Square has been the location of a number of murders recently, including one in 2012, one in 2018 and one in 2020.

== See also ==
- Oakley Square, another garden square a little to the east
