= Ampthill Square Estate =

Housing estate in the London Borough of Camden

Coordinates: 51.5317°N 0.1367°W

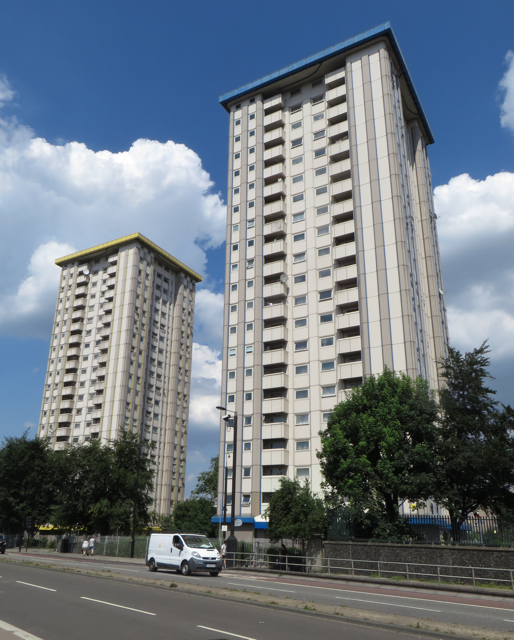
- The Gillfoot and Dalehead buildings
- Interactive map of Ampthill Square Estate

General information
- Location: Somers Town
- Area: London
- No. of blocks: 3
- No. of units: 366

Construction
- Constructed: 1960s

Refurbishment
- Refurbished: 2005

Other information
- Governing body: Camden Council

The Ampthill Square Estate, also known as the Ampthill Estate, is a housing estate in the London Borough of Camden in London, England. The estate is located in the Somers Town district, on the south side of Harrington Square, east side of Hampstead Road, and west side of Eversholt Street.

The estate was built in the 1960s to replace dilapidated Victorian housing in the area. It is composed of eight 6-storey blocks on its east side and three distinctive 21-storey high rises on the west side, which dominate the local skyline. In total, the estate has 366 flats and maisonettes: 240 of which are in the towers. The estate was reclad in the 1980s. Its cladding was found in 2017 to be solid aluminium, after fears it might be the same ACM cladding as Grenfell Tower. It received a further £20m in investment in 2005.

The site was formerly known as Fig Mead. It was developed as a garden suburb by the Duke of Bedford, as part of the Bedford Estate in 1800. It takes its names from Ampthill, the Bedfordshire town where the Dukes of Bedford owned Houghton House. Half of the square itself was soon bought by the London and Birmingham Railway for its tracks into Euston station. In this time, Charles Dickens bought his mistress Ellen Lawless Ternan a house at 2 Houghton Place, Ampthill Square. However, it fell into disrepair, including being directly hit by a bomb in the Second World War, and the estate was built on the site. While Ampthill Square previously had two bridges that crossed the railways that fed into Euston, the rebuilt estate is separated from the western side of the railway.
