= Carreras Tobacco Company =

British company

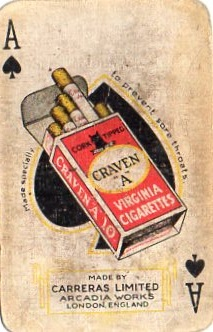
- Vintage Craven "A" branded playing card, a brand of Carreras Tobacco Company (This can be dated to post-1928, as it mentions the Arcadia Works).
- Industry: Tobacco
- Founder: Don José Carreras Ferrer
- Fate: Merged with Rothmans of Pall Mall in 1958.
- Headquarters: London
- Products: Cigarette

The House of Carreras was a tobacco business established in London in the nineteenth century by Don José Carreras Ferrer, a nobleman from Spain. It remained an independent company until merging with Rothmans of Pall Mall in November 1958. In 1972 the name was used as the vehicle for the merger of various European tobacco interests to form Rothmans International.

== History ==
=== 19th century ===
The antecedents of the Carreras business began trading in the eighteenth century (the company's products and advertising materials consistently bore the motto 'Established 1788'), and forebears of the founder’s family were Spanish apothecaries. The founder of the business was a Spanish nobleman, Don José Carreras Ferrer, who fought in the Peninsular War under the Duke of Wellington (1808–1814). After serving and receiving the highest military honours, it is believed he was obliged to leave Spain on account of his political views.

During the early years of the 19th century, Carreras began trading in London at a time when cigars were increasing in popularity and Don José became a pioneer in his field. However, although the business prospered it did not become a major concern until his son, Don José Joaquin, began to specialise in the blending of tobaccos and snuff. By 1852 Don José Joaquin Carreras had established himself near Leicester Square at 61 Prince's Street W1, and in 1853 was granted a warrant as the sole supplier of cigars and tobacco to the Spanish Legation in London. His fame as a tobacco blender soon spread, and he produced blends to suit the individual tastes of the highest members of society, with customers visiting his showrooms to select their own tobaccos. One of Don José's most famous customers was the third Earl of Craven. Some of Don José's tobacco brands became world-famous, including Guards' Mixture and Hankey's Mixture. Over one thousand brands of cigar could be bought from Carreras, together with snuffs, cigarettes, pipes and other requisites of the trade.

In 1860 Carreras became the founder committee member of the Tobacco Trade Benevolent Association, and soon opened another shop, this time in the Arcade in London's newly developed Regent Street W1.

The business remained in the hands of the Carreras family until 1894, when Mr. W J Yapp, a well-known figure in the shoe leather industry, took control. Prince's Street became part of Wardour Street in 1878, and Number 61 became known as Prince's House, No 7 Wardour Street. The House of Carreras became a London landmark, and it was here that Prince Edward (later Edward VII) often came to select the finest cigars.

=== Early 20th century ===
In 1881, the first cigarette-making machine was patented in the United States by James Bonsack, and by 1883 one of the British manufacturers, WD & HO Wills, had pioneered the use of the Bonsack machine in England. Wills joined with twelve other companies to form the Imperial Tobacco Group, from which both Rothmans and Carreras chose to remain independent, and by 1901 the Bonsack machine, making 200 cigarettes a minute, was exclusively available only to members of this Group. Around this time another of the cigarette machine makers, Bernhard Baron, had returned to London from the United States in 1896 with a patent for a new machine which could make 450 cigarettes a minute. Baron's progress was watched with interest by Mr. Yapp who was by then running the Carreras business but who was keen to make cigarettes a paying venture.

Having been unable to sell his machines to the newly formed Imperial Tobacco Company, which had a monopoly on the Bonsack machines, Yapp was able to negotiate a business arrangement with Baron in 1903. On 6 June 1903, Carreras became a public company with Yapp and Baron as directors and, under the leadership of Bernhard Baron, heralded the beginnings of competition for the Imperial Tobacco Group and the new American maker, James Buchanan Duke, who was also capturing large slices of the British market with Ogden’s Guinea Gold, the first Virginia cigarette made in England. The original Carreras prospectus was heavily criticised in the City press, but within a short time, the shares were fully subscribed, particularly by members of the tobacco trade, who saw potential in the new venture. The Baron family had a reputation as good employers who treated their staff well. Bernhard Baron would walk amongst his employees daily, enquiring after their families, and his son, Louis, and his grandson, Maurice, also made regular visits to the factory floor. A tradition developed that on Bernhard's birthday, each December, all employees were given two weeks' wages and a cake to take home.

In 1904, an allied company was established. Called Carreras and Marcianus Ltd and operating from St James's Place, Aldgate EC3, the former Baron Machine Company works, the company’s purpose was to commence production of machine-made cigarettes. During the last six months of 1904 three brands made their debut, including Black Cat, the first cigarette in the United Kingdom to contain coupons that were redeemable for gifts.

In 1905 yet more brands were introduced such as Chick, Jetty, and Sweet Kiss and Carreras began coupon trading in Black Cat. The business prospered and in 1906 additional premises were opened nearby, introducing new brands such as Carreras Ovals and 7Up. Baron chose many novel schemes for the promotion of Carreras’ pipe tobacco and cigarette brands. In 1909, the company introduced the Baron automatic pipe filler in cartridges, which revolutionised pipe smoking and sold by the millions.

In 1907 Carreras introduced an early version of the football pools. Coupons listing forthcoming matches were available from tobacconists and prizes were given for both the best forecast and to the owner of the shop from where the coupon had been purchased.

Expansion of the business continued and, in 1907, the first Arcadia Works was built on City Road EC1. More developments were made in the pipe field, including a cartridge case. Other brands were introduced before the First World War including Fireball, Golden Clipper, Red Route Mixture, and Life Ray.

In 1913, Carreras acquired the business of Alexander Boguslavsky and opened a showroom at 55 Piccadilly W1 which still retained many of its privately occupied houses and clubs. The medallion, which is still reproduced on each packet of Piccadilly Filter, was acquired with the purchase of Boguslavsky's company.

The 1914-18 war caused a rapid acceleration in cigarette smoking and Carreras was to the fore in supplying cigarettes to the armed forces. Cigarettes were in short supply but Baron continued making cigarettes and increased marketing in an attempt to outsell competitors. As an example, he enclosed French dictionaries in the containers of all cigarettes sent to the Front and supplied millions of copies of phrase and grammar books.

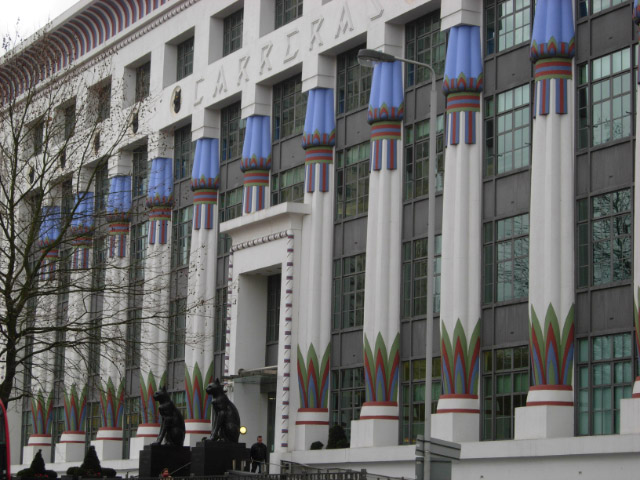
The Arcadia works at Mornington Crescent

In 1921, after the launch of Craven A, Carreras launched more brands such as Wall Arms, Piccadilly, and Turf. By 1927 the business had outgrown the Arcadia premises in City Road; the war had increased demand for cigarettes. In 1928, the famous Arcadia Works was opened in Mornington Crescent, formerly a favourite residence of artists and writers. This building, which has become a major London landmark, was unusual in its design. It was the first factory in Britain to make use of pre-stressed concrete technology, and the first to contain air conditioning and a dust extraction plant. The company was also the first to provide full welfare services for its employees. The Arcadia Works was often visited by royalty, including the Duke of Windsor when he was the Prince of Wales, King George VI when he was the Duke of York, and the Duke of Kent. Many other important visitors from every part of the globe were entertained at Mornington Crescent. Leading to the entrance of the building were two large bronze cats. Cast at the Haskins Foundry in London, these versions of the Egyptian god Bastet were each eight feet six inches tall and stood guard over Arcadia Works until 1959 when Carreras merged with Rothmans of Pall Mall and moved to a new factory in Basildon, Essex. The cats were separated, with one making the short journey to Essex, while the other went to be displayed outside the Carreras factory at Spanishtown, Jamaica.

Between the two World Wars, Carreras' sales in the United Kingdom and overseas increased, and more brands were launched. In 1929, trade-marks were acquired with the purchase of John Sinclair Ltd of Newcastle upon Tyne (including Barneys Tobacco, Barneys Punchbowle, and Parson's Pleasure). Soon after the purchase of Sinclairs the grandson of the founder of the firm, John Alexander Sinclair, was elected to the Board of Carreras and later became Joint Managing Director.

=== Post World War II ===
Once again a World War brought a sharp increase in the nation’s demand for cigarettes, coinciding with a scarcity of tobacco leaf. This brought about a shortage of both Carreras and its competitors' products, a situation which was not alleviated until the early 1950s. In 1953, Carreras acquired the assets of R & J Hill Ltd of London and the entire share capital of Murray, Sons and Company Ltd of Belfast who were manufacturing a range of popular pipe tobaccos, including Erinmore Mixture and Erinmore Flake.

At this time, Alfred Dunhill Ltd, the tobacconists which had been established in 1907 at No 30 Duke Street SW1, was a subsidiary of the Carreras Group. Carreras also had an associate in Jamaica and an interest in P J Carroll, Ireland’s largest cigarette manufacturer. The Dutch cigar company, Schimmelpenninck, was also part of the Group. The Baron family, which had held a controlling interest in Carreras since the early 1900s, decided to sell their shares in 1958 but, before doing so, were responsible for two major projects of the Company. It was decided to transfer the manufacturing plant to the new town of Basildon in Essex as the Arcadia Works in Mornington Crescent had become uneconomic and mass production techniques were being carried out on different floor levels. With the beginning of the swing towards filtered cigarette smoking, Carreras launched a brand that came to have national appeal - Guards.

In November 1958, with the sale of the Baron family shares, Carreras merged with Rothmans of Pall Mall which by now had markets in some 120 countries around the world. Two factors played an important part in bringing together Rothmans and Carreras. The first was the trend towards filter cigarettes which was beginning in the 1950s. Both Rothmans and Carreras had pioneered filtered brands. The second was Carreras’ decision to move manufacturing to the large, modern factory in Basildon which could provide much-needed production capacity for Rothmans with its expanding international trade.

A manufacturing agreement was entered into and by 1961 the business had expanded to the point where Carreras had acquired the Rothmans cigarette and tobacco business in Britain and some of its overseas markets. As a result of this deal, the biggest shareholder in the operation became Rothmans Tobacco (Holdings). As the business expanded so new trading links were forged and new businesses opened up.

Carreras Rothmans Ltd was formed in 1972 when Carreras Limited was used as the vehicle for the merger of various European tobacco interests to form Rothmans International.

== Famous customers ==
Carreras's Regent Street store was visited by royalty from many lands and as early as 1866 he received Royal Warrants from the Prince of Wales and the Duke of Saxe-Coburg-Gotha. Shortly after in 1874, Carreras received a Warrant from King Alfonso XII of Spain. The hand-written sales ledgers of this period show accounts held by nobility, statesmen, men of letters, and high-ranking service officers.

J. M. Barrie, the famous novelist and author was a valued customer during the 1890s. When he wrote My Lady Nicotine which was published in 1890, he referred to tobacco called Arcadia Mixture. Soon, before Carreras realised that Barrie's sole supply of tobacco was the Craven Mixture he sold at Wardour Street, and in January 1897 Barrie confirmed to Don Jose that Arcadia Mixture and Craven Mixture were one and the same. Shortly afterward, Carreras began using Barrie's endorsement in his advertising, and Craven Mixture benefited as sales at home and abroad increased rapidly.

== Products ==
=== Craven A ===
Soon after the end of the 1914-18 War, the market resumed its normal competitiveness. Baron launched a brand in 1921 with the slogan "Will Not Affect Your Throat". This was the first-ever machine-made cork-tipped cigarette, selling under the brand name of Craven A, again using the name of the Earl of Craven whose family remain close friends of the Rothmans International Group of companies. After the success of Craven A, various cork tipped brands were launched to compete by Imperial Tobacco Company and other tobacco houses. At the same time, the competition was moving in on the coupon business but Carreras stayed remained popular with their coupon brand Black Cat.

=== Black Cat ===
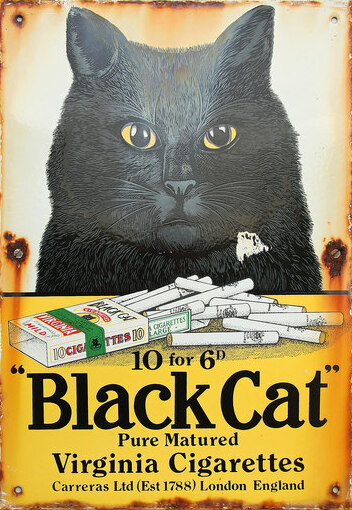
Adverisment for Black Cat Cigarettes from the early 20th century

Black Cat is now a cigarette brand sold around the world named after a real black domestic cat. The cat spent hours curled up asleep in the window of Don José’s Wardour Street shop, well before the turn of the 20th century. Because the cat became such a familiar sight to the passers-by, the shop began to be known as the “black cat shop”. Don José decided to adopt the cat as part of the company's image and in 1886 it became the first trademark to be registered by Carreras. Eventually, the cat became an integral part of the design of the Black Cat pack where it appeared in a white circle surrounded by a black border above the initials “JJC” (Don José Joaquin Carreras).

The Black Cat cigarette was introduced in 1904 as one of the first machine-made cigarettes manufactured in Britain. The cat was used in some of the earliest cigarette promotions, including the Black Cat stamp album which was issued free to smokers. Stamps were available inside the cigarette packs and £325 in prizes was offered for the most completed albums. The first item to be given away inside Black Cat cigarette packets was the Black Cat Library of Short Stories which appeared in 1909. This was a series of forty adventure stories with titles ranging from “A Fight with the Spaniards”, to “The Gunpowder Plot”, “Who Was the Man in the Iron Mask?” and “The Revenge”. In 1910 Black Cat began full-scale coupon trading, offering gifts such as pipe fillers and other smokers' requisites. One of the most ambitious promotions took place on 18 October 1913 - designated by the company as “Black Cat Day”. Advertised extensively in the national press, Black Cat salesmen could give a golden half-sovereign to anyone they approached in the street who could prove they were in possession of a Black Cat pack.

During the First World War Carreras sent gift parcels to the British troops which included French phrase books inside cigarette packs. These were to enable the soldiers to “get on better terms with our French allies”. In 1914 Black Cat cigarettes offered smokers a chance to collect small cardboard flags of the Allies and in 1916 the first set of cigarette cards was included in the packs. This was a set of 140 war cartoons by Louis Raemaekers which could fetch a considerable price at auction today. The next series of cards quickly followed, featuring Women on War Work. This was succeeded in 1915 by a series on the Science of Boxing.

During the early 1920s enthusiasm for the Black Cat was at a peak, with many people wearing badges and stickers featuring the cat and even going to fancy dress parties in black cat costumes. By now, coupon trading was fiercely competitive and the Black Cat gift catalogue offered gramophone records, gardening equipment, gentlemen's razors, automobile accessories and wirelesses. The cigarette manufacturers agreed to withdraw coupons on 1 January 1934 but the number and variety of cigarette card series continued to increase, with Carreras amongst the most prolific of the issuing companies.

During the Second World War, many cigarette brands were withdrawn from sale and Black Cat was one of these. The brand didn’t appear again until 1957, but it was reintroduced as a plain cigarette at a time when huge sales were being made by filter cigarettes. The market for plain brands continued to diminish and Black Cat was withdrawn again in 1959. It made another appearance on the UK market in 1976, this time as a filter cigarette, but finally disappeared in November 1993. The trademark continues in the ownership of the British American Tobacco Group of companies.

=== Coupons ===
In 1931, coupons were introduced to small cigarettes and sold under the brand name Clubs. This was a departure from the usual range of gifts, offering in their place a limited range of selected articles covering more personal day-to-day requirements.

The brand was very successful. At one time there were no fewer than 14 factories devoted entirely to the production of clothing to be given in return for coupons for Clubs cigarettes. Sales increased rapidly and more competition arose with at least six other brands of a similar type. Clubs' success even persuaded Gallaher Tobacco to introduce coupons into Park Drive, a move which all through the coupon war they had steadfastly maintained they would never do.

The companies agreed to end the coupon war in 1933 with the formation of the Tobacco Trade Association, now the UK Tobacco Manufacturers' Association.

To increase sales of this brand of cigarettes, and to offer a cheaper price, there was the introduction of the Flip top 20 pack a design submitted by Frederick Willis. Although the package was used by the company no patent was issued for the design and therefore no residuals paid for its design and use. Today most brands of cigarettes can be purchased in these 20 Flip Top packages.
