= Bernhard Baron =

Belarusian-born American tobacco manufacturer and philanthropist (1850-1929)

- Born: 5 December 1850; Brest-Litovsk, Russian Empire
- Died: 1 August 1929 (aged 78); Brighton
- Occupations: Tobacco manufacturer and philanthropist
- Family: Louis Baron

Bernhard Baron (5 December 1850 – 1 August 1929) was a tobacco manufacturer and philanthropist.

He was born in Brest-Litovsk in the Russian Empire (now in Belarus), to Jewish parents. He lived in Rostov as a child, and immigrated to the United States at an early age with his father. Following work at a tobacco factory in the United States, and time spent making cigarettes by hand, he invented a cigarette-making machine. From 1890 to 1895 he was managing director of the National Cigarette Tobacco Company of New York, which he had set up with the backing of a group of financiers to challenge the powerful tobacco trusts.

In 1895 he visited England to sell the patent rights to his cigarette machine. However, he was attracted by the commercial opportunities and moved to England, where he established the Baron Cigarette Machine Company Limited in Aldgate, London. The patent was later sold to the United Cigarette Machine Company for £120,000. He expanded into the production of cigarettes and tobacco and in 1903 he joined the board of the Carreras Tobacco Company, becoming its managing director in 1904 and chairman in 1905. He retained these posts until his death.

Following his business success he engaged in philanthropy, focusing on hospitals and hospital patients, including the creation of a trust. Amongst the projects supported by the trust was a cradle-to-grave school in the East End of London, originally established as the St George's Jewish Settlement and run by Basil Henriques and Rose Henriques. With a capacity of over 1,000 pupils it provided everything from kindergarten to adult literacy classes. The school building at 71 Henriques Street in Shadwell is now named Bernhard Baron House and has been converted to flats.

While living in the US he married Rachel Schwartz of Washington, who died in 1920. They had three daughters and one son. His son Louis succeeded him as chairman of Carreras and was created a baronet in 1930.

Bernhard Baron died at Brighton in 1929, and his estate was valued at £5 million.

== See also ==
- Carreras Tobacco Company
- Smoking in the United Kingdom
- List of Jews born in the Russian Empire and the Soviet Union
