= Mornington Crescent =

Street in Camden, London, England

Coordinates: 51.5334°N 0.1405°W

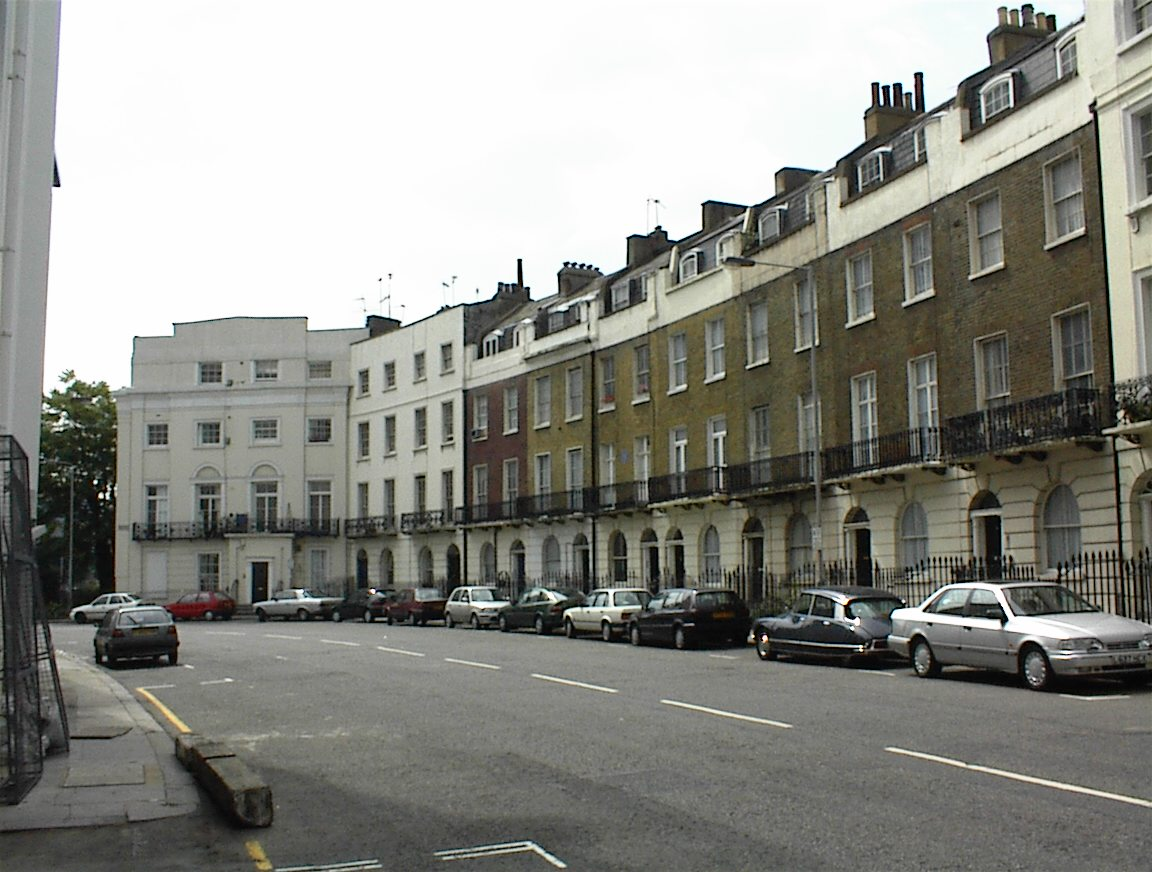
Mornington Crescent

Mornington Crescent is a terraced street in Camden Town, Camden, London, England. It was built in the 1820s, on a greenfield site just to the north of central London. Many of the houses were subdivided into flats during the Victorian era, and what was the street's communal garden is now the Carreras Building. Mornington Crescent tube station which opened in 1907, takes its name from the street.

== History ==
The crescent was named after the Earl of Mornington, brother of the Duke of Wellington. Comprising three curved terraces grouped in a crescent form around communal gardens, the north side of the crescent (numbers 37–46) was constructed first, dating from the 1820s or earlier. With 36 spacious houses suitable for professional people, the crescent was originally surrounded by green fields, enjoying views across open country to the front and rear, yet was conveniently close to town. It was at the southern end of the slightly older Arlington Street, now Arlington Road.

However, the building of the railway line into the Euston terminus, and encroachment from the nearby working class districts of Kings Cross and Camden Town led to a change in the demographics of the area during the Victorian era. More and more, the houses were subdivided into houses of multiple occupancy with flats housing artists and artisans.

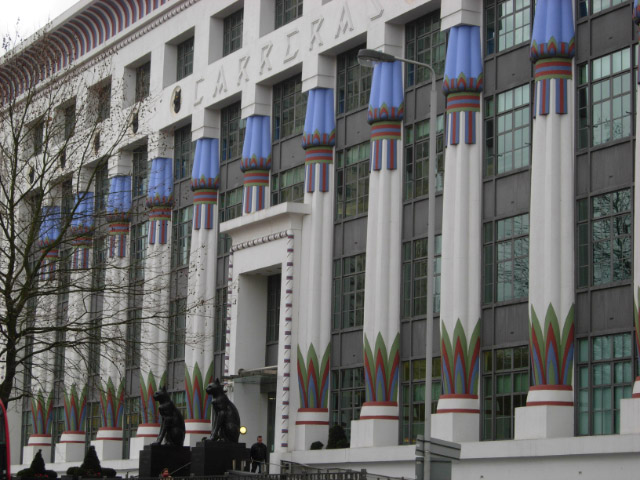
The Art Deco Carreras Building

The former communal gardens of the crescent are now occupied by a large Art Deco building, known as the Carreras Building. Originally built as a tobacco factory in 1926–28 by the Carreras Tobacco Company, it is a striking example of early 20th Century Egyptian Revival architecture and a distinctive local landmark, not least because of the large bronze statues of the Egyptian cat god Bastet which adorn the front. In the 1990s the building was restored and converted into an office building and renamed Greater London House.

== Cultural associations ==
The crescent has a number of literary and artistic associations. The artist Frank Auerbach has a studio nearby and has often painted the crescent and surrounding area. The crescent was a popular subject of the Camden Town Group; the painter Walter Sickert lived there from 1905, at number 6, and Spencer Gore lived at number 31 from 1909 to 1912. Clarkson Stanfield (a painter friend of Charles Dickens) lived at number 36 from 1834 to 1841. The painter Harden Sidney Melville lived for a time at number 34. Dickens went to a school, Wellington House Academy, on Granby Terrace adjoining Mornington Crescent, after his spell working in a blacking warehouse.

== Cultural references ==
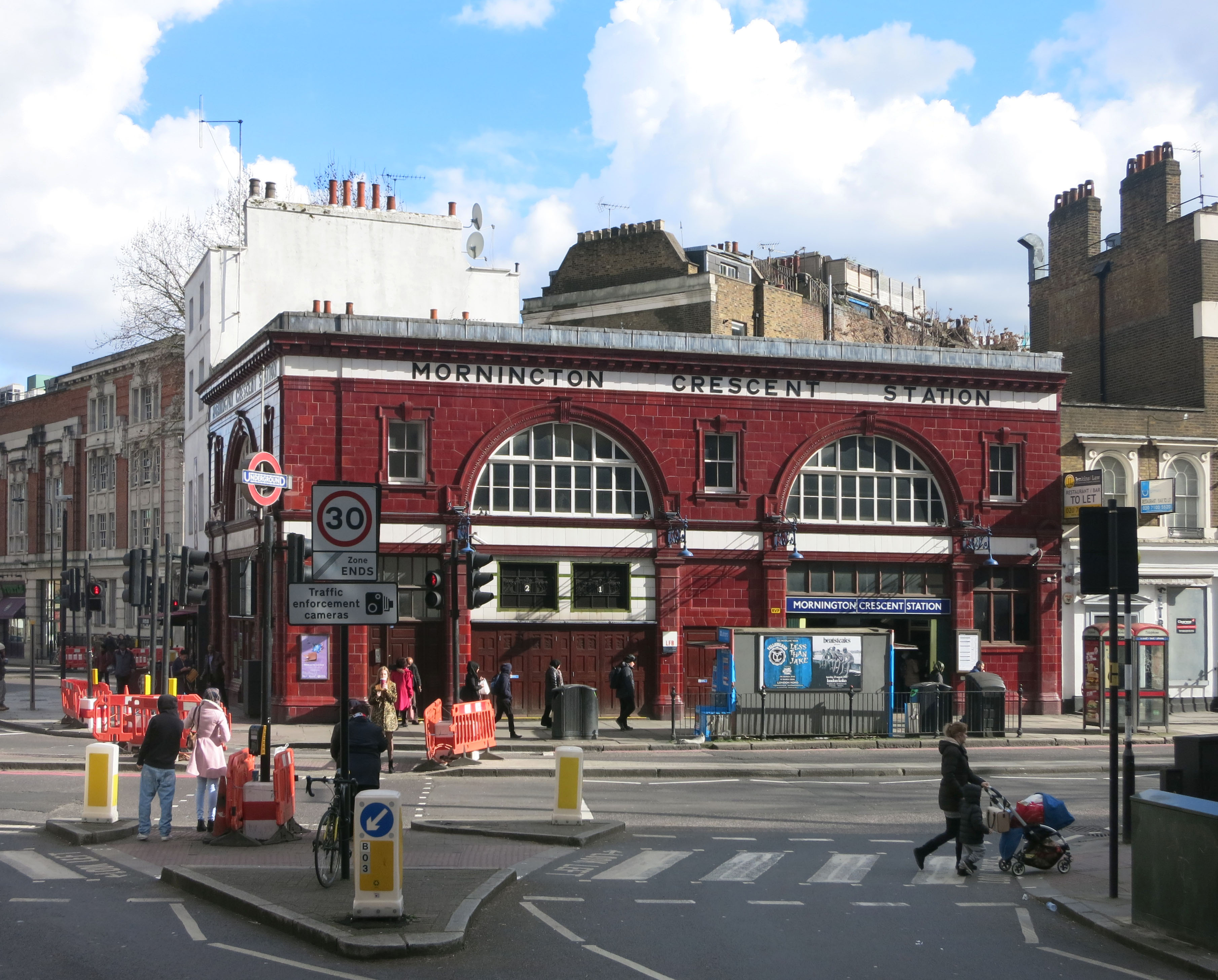
Mornington Crescent tube station seen from the street.

=== In art ===
- Spencer Gore Fireside scene at Mornington Crescent, Leeds city art gallery collection. Oil on canvas. Spencer Gore painted many views from his room at no 31, looking over the Crescent. Two are Mornington Crescent, looking north-east, 1911 (Museum of London) and Mornington Crescent, looking south c. 1911 (John Quinn Collection). Both are reproduced in London in Paint, by Galinou and Hayes, Museum of London 1996, pp. 356–358.
- Painter Walter Sickert lived on the street in 1907 at number 6, at the time of "the Camden Town Murder", and later renamed a group of his paintings The Camden Town Murder.

=== In business ===
- In 1967, Heinz launched an advertising campaign with the slogan "Beanz Meanz Heinz". The phrase was created by advertising executive Maurice Drake and went on to become one of the best-known advertising slogans in the United Kingdom. Drake later said the slogan was "written over two pints of beer in The Victoria pub in Mornington Crescent".

=== In film ===
- Mornington Crescent was used as a filming location for the films An Education (2009) and Brighton Rock (2011).

=== In radio ===
- Mornington Crescent is a spoof game, featured since the 1970s in the BBC Radio 4 comedy panel show I'm Sorry I Haven't a Clue, which satirises complicated strategy games. A Comic Heritage blue plaque honouring Willie Rushton, one of the show's longest-serving panelists, was installed within the Mornington Crescent tube station in 2002. It is located behind the ticket barrier at the top of the stairs to the platform.

=== In literature ===
- David A. McIntee's Final Destination novel, Destination Zero, has a story about Patti Fuller's great-grandmother in Mornington Crescent. Juliet Collins had a premonition that a house of a landlady will explode as she told everyone to leave before it was too late. It was later revealed that the cause of the explosion was coming from an underground gas leak in which the miners unintentionally left their tools behind.
- Iain Pears's novel Stone's Fall (2009) references an apparently fictional murder case called the "Mornington Crescent trial". The murderer is a man named William Goulding, who kept the head of his victim in a box under his bed.

=== In music ===
- The band Belle and Sebastian have a song titled 'Mornington Crescent' on their album The Life Pursuit (2006).
- Chamber pop band My Life Story released an album titled Mornington Crescent (1995) on Mother Tongue Records.
- William Hargreaves' song "The Night I Appeared as Macbeth" (1922) includes the lines: "They made me a present/Of Mornington Crescent/They threw it a brick at a time".
- The Mornington Crescent tube station was used as the filming location of the music video of Be There (1998) by British electronic group Unkle.
