= Kentish Town =

Area of London, England

Coordinates: 51.5447°N 0.1459°W

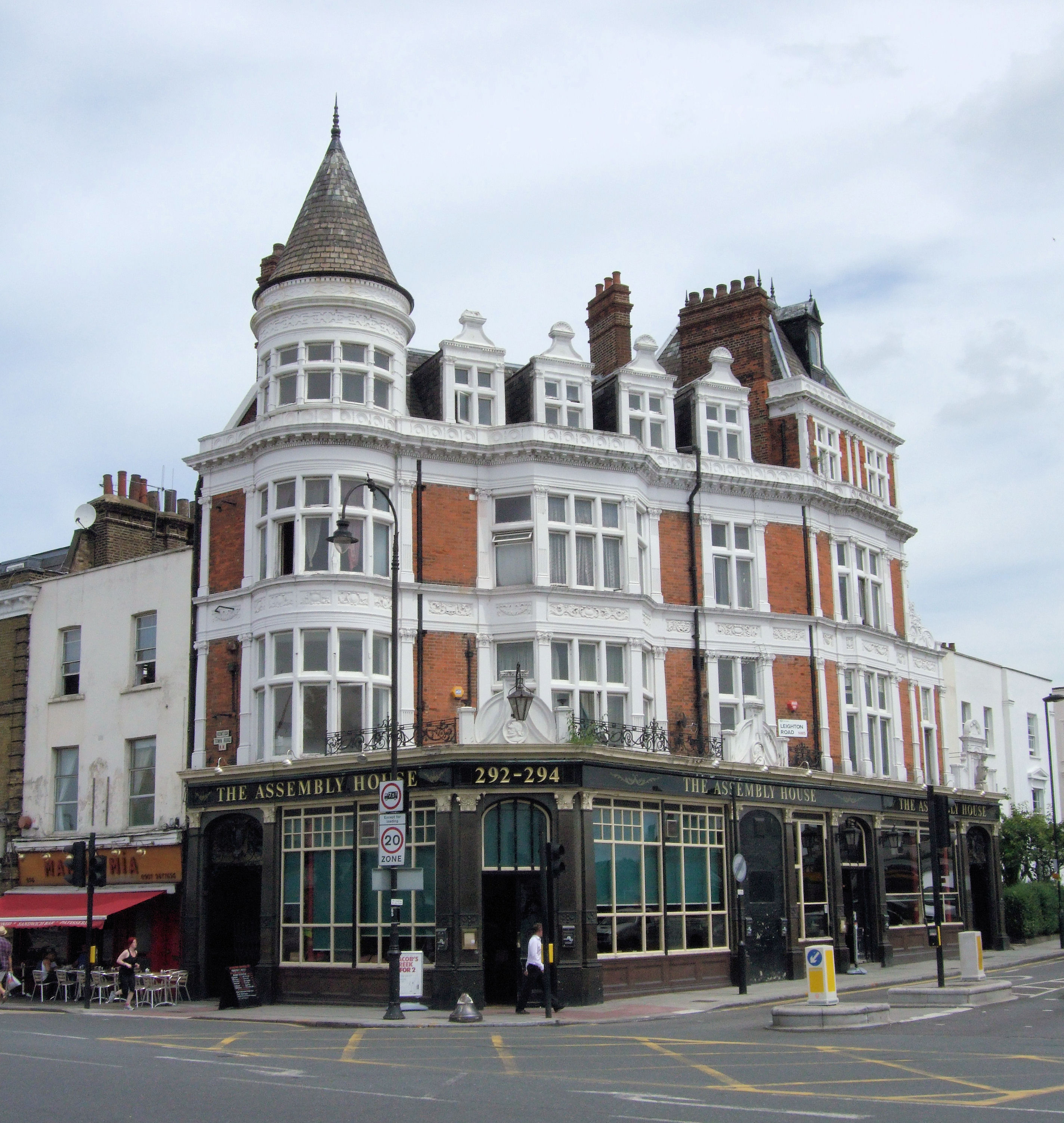
- The Assembly House Pub, Kentish Town

- Location within Greater London
- OS grid reference: TQ285845
- London borough: Camden
- Ceremonial county: Greater London
- Region: London
- Country: England
- Sovereign state: United Kingdom
- Post town: LONDON
- Postcode district: NW5, NW1
- Dialling code: 020
- Police: Metropolitan
- Fire: London
- Ambulance: London
- UK Parliament: Holborn and St Pancras
- London Assembly: Barnet and Camden

Kentish Town is an area in the London Borough of Camden, immediately north of Camden Town, close to Hampstead Heath.

The area was initially a small settlement on the River Fleet, first recorded in 1207 during King John's reign. The early 19th century brought modernization to the area, and it became a popular resort due to its accessibility from London. Karl Marx lived in Kentish Town from 1855 until his death in 1883.

The area saw further development after World War II and has a rich history of political representation; former Labour Party Prime Minister Keir Starmer held the Holborn and St Pancras parliamentary seat from 2015 to 2026. Kentish Town has also been a popular filming location for various movies and television shows. It is home to numerous independently owned shops, music venues, and cultural establishments, such as the Kentish Town Community Centre.

== Toponymy ==
The name of Kentish Town is probably derived from Ken-ditch or Caen-ditch, meaning the "bed of a waterway" and is otherwise unrelated to the English county of Kent. In researching the meaning of Ken-ditch, it has also been noted that ken is the Celtic word for both "green" and "river", while ditch refers to the River Fleet, now a subterranean river. However, another theory is the name comes from its position near the Fleet; it has been suggested that Kentish Town, which lies in between two forks of the Fleet, takes its name from cant or cantle (from the Middle English meaning "corner").

== Boundaries ==
In The Fields Beneath, author and resident Gillian Tindall writes that the northern and southern boundaries are defined by railway lines; the northern one crossing Highgate Road close to Gordon House Road and the southern one crossing Kentish Town Road close to Water Lane. A plaque marking the border between Kentish Town and Camden Town is displayed under the railway arch on Kentish Town Road. To the east, the neighbourhood extends to York Way, which also marks the boundary between the boroughs of Camden and Islington. The southeastern border is usually placed at Camden Road, possibly extending to Agar Grove. To the west, Kentish Town becomes Chalk Farm "about two-thirds the way along Prince of Wales Road," writes Tindall, perhaps at the junction with Malden Road.

== History ==
Kentish Town was originally a small settlement on the River Fleet (the waterway is now one of London's underground rivers). It is first recorded during the reign of King John (1207) as kentisston. By 1456 Kentish Town was a thriving hamlet. In this period, a chapel of ease was built for its inhabitants.

The early 19th century brought modernisation, causing much of the area's rural qualities, the River Fleet and the 18th-century buildings to vanish, although pockets still remain, for example Little Green Street. Between the availability of public transport to it from London, and its urbanisation, it was a popular resort.

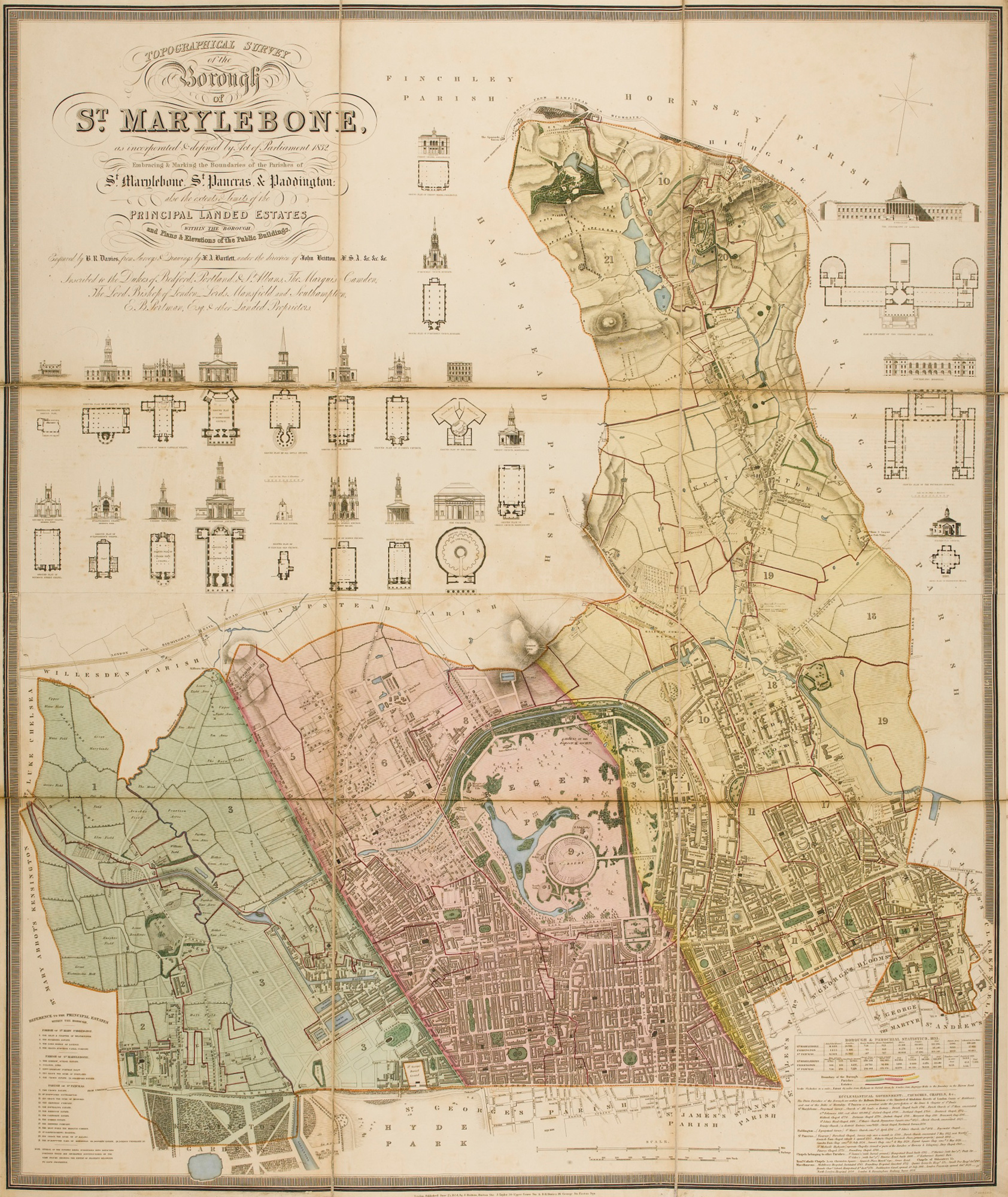
Topographical survey of (west to east); Paddington, St. Marylebone and St. Pancras Parishes. Engraving by B.R. Davies, 1,145 mm × 950 mm (45.1 in × 37.4 in), dated 1834.

Large amounts of land were purchased to build the railway, which can still be seen today. Kentish Town was a prime site for development as the Kentish Town Road was a major route from London northwards. Karl Marx was a famous resident, living at 46 Grafton Terrace from 1856. Jenny Marx described this eight-room house in Kentish Town as "A truly princely dwelling, compared with the holes we used to live in" (March 11, 1861 letter by Jenny Marx, quoted in Rachel Holmes, "Eleanor Marx: A Life", Bloomsbury Books, London, 2014, P 10).

1877 saw the beginning of mission work in the area as it was then poor. The mission first held their services outside but as their funding increased they built a mission house, chapel, and vicarage. One mission house of the area was Lyndhurst Hall which remained in use before being taken over by the council. The Council wished it to sell it for residential use, and the hall was demolished in 2006.

During the 19th century and early 20th century the area of Kentish Town became the home of several piano and organ manufacturers, and was described by The Piano Journal in 1901 as "that healthful suburb dear to the heart of the piano maker".

A network of streets in the East of Kentish Town has streets named after places or persons connected with Christ Church, Oxford viz: Oseney, Busby, Gaisford, Caversham, Islip, Wolsey, Frideswide, Peckwater & Hammond. All these streets lay behind a pub that was known as the Oxford Tavern until 2023. Some of the freehold of these streets is still in the name of Christ Church Oxford.

A network of streets in the north of Kentish Town was part of a large estate owned by St John's College, Cambridge. Lady Margaret Road is named after Lady Margaret Beaufort, foundress of St John's College. Burghley Road is named after Lord Burghley, Chancellor to Elizabeth I and benefactor of St John's. Similarly, College Lane, Evangelist Road and Lady Somerset Road are street names linked to the estate of St John's College.

In 1912 the Church of St Silas the Martyr (designed by architect Ernest Charles Shearman) was finally erected and consecrated, and by December of that year it became a parish in its own right. It can still be seen today along with the church of St Luke with St Paul and the Church of St Barnabas (handed over to the Greek Orthodox Church in 1957). The present Church of England parish church is St Benet and All Saints, Lupton Street.

In his poem Parliament Hill Fields, Sir John Betjeman refers to "the curious Anglo-Norman parish church of Kentish Town". This possibly refers to the former parish Church of St John Kentish Town.

Kentish Town Road contains one of London's many disused Tube stations. South Kentish Town tube station was closed in June 1924 after strike action at the Lots Road Power Station meant the lift could not be used. It never reopened as a station, although it was used as an air raid shelter during World War II. The distinctive building is now occupied underground by a massage shop and on ground level by a 'Cash Converters' pawn shop at the corner of Kentish Town Road and Castle Road. There have been proposals to rebuild the station.

Kentish Town was to see further modernisation in the post-World War II period. However, the residential parts of Kentish Town, dating back to the mid-19th century have survived.

== Political representation ==
Kentish Town is part of the Holborn and St Pancras seat which is held by Labour Party Prime Minister Keir Starmer as of March 2024. Kentish Town was an early base for the Social Democratic Party and the increasingly middle class population has returned large votes for the Greens and Liberal Democrats. In May 2006 the Liberal Democrats won two of the three Council seats in Kentish Town, strengthening this hold by taking the final seat in a by-election in November of the same year. In the Council elections in May 2010, Labour regained all three Council seats.

In May 2022, the ward of Kentish Town North elected two Labour Councillors Sylvia McNamara and James Slater. Kentish Town South reelected Labour Councillors Georgia Gould, Meric Apac, and Jenny Headlam-Wells.

== Filming location ==
In 2002 the comedy and drama film About a Boy was filmed in Lady Margaret Road and Oseney Crescent. Many of the filming locations used in the 2006 film Venus, starring Peter O'Toole, Leslie Phillips, and Jodie Whittaker were in Kentish Town. In 1959 Lady Somerset Road and Oakford Road were used substantially for the filming of Sapphire, a film exploring racial tension in London, directed by Basil Dearden. The Assembly House pub was the location for the 1971 film Villain starring Richard Burton. The 1993 comedy Bad Behaviour, featuring Stephen Rea and Sinéad Cusack, was set in Kentish Town and includes scenes set in several local streets and the Owl Bookshop.

The 1947 Ealing Studios film It Always Rains on Sunday had scenes shot in Clarence Way showing Holy Trinity Church with just the lower part of its spire still intact following the destruction of the upper part of the spire in WWII. The entire spire has since been removed leaving the church, effectively, with a tower. Kentish Town was also used as the location for the BBC comedy series Gimme Gimme Gimme with its main protagonists Tom and Linda living with their ex-prostitute landlord and upstairs neighbour Beryl at the fictional and suggestively named "69 Paradise Passage". In addition, the video of the Madness track "Baggy Trousers" was filmed at Islip Street School and the park in Kentish Town.

The Anglican Parish Church of St John Kentish Town, now known as Christ Apostolic Church, was used by Only Fools and Horses as the backdrop (in external scenes) exterior of the Church where Damien was christened.

Several exterior shots in the BBC tragicomedy Fleabag were filmed in Kentish Town, star/writer Phoebe Waller-Bridge being a resident.

=== Camden Film Quarter ===
In June 2026, planning approval was granted for a £1bn development project to create a TV production hub, student accommodation and housing. The planning committee vote resulted in 6 members being in favour and 5 members being against. The development will be in an area of Kentish Town (Regis Road) that has been used as an industrial brownfield site. The area was first identified as a development opportunity a decade prior to this decision. The controversial plans include housing on top of a civic amenity site.

== Shops and organisations ==
In 2005, a survey of Kentish Town by the local Green Party claimed that out of 87 shops on Kentish Town Road (locally known as Kentish Town High Street), 53 were still independently owned. The high street is a mixture of national retail chains and independent shops, including a long-standing bookshop, several delis and organic stores. Many 'World Food' shops have opened up on the street. However, since 2009 there has been a marked increase in independent shops being replaced with chain stores. One of London's most famous nudist public baths, Rio's, is in Kentish Town.

=== Kentish Town Sports Centre ===
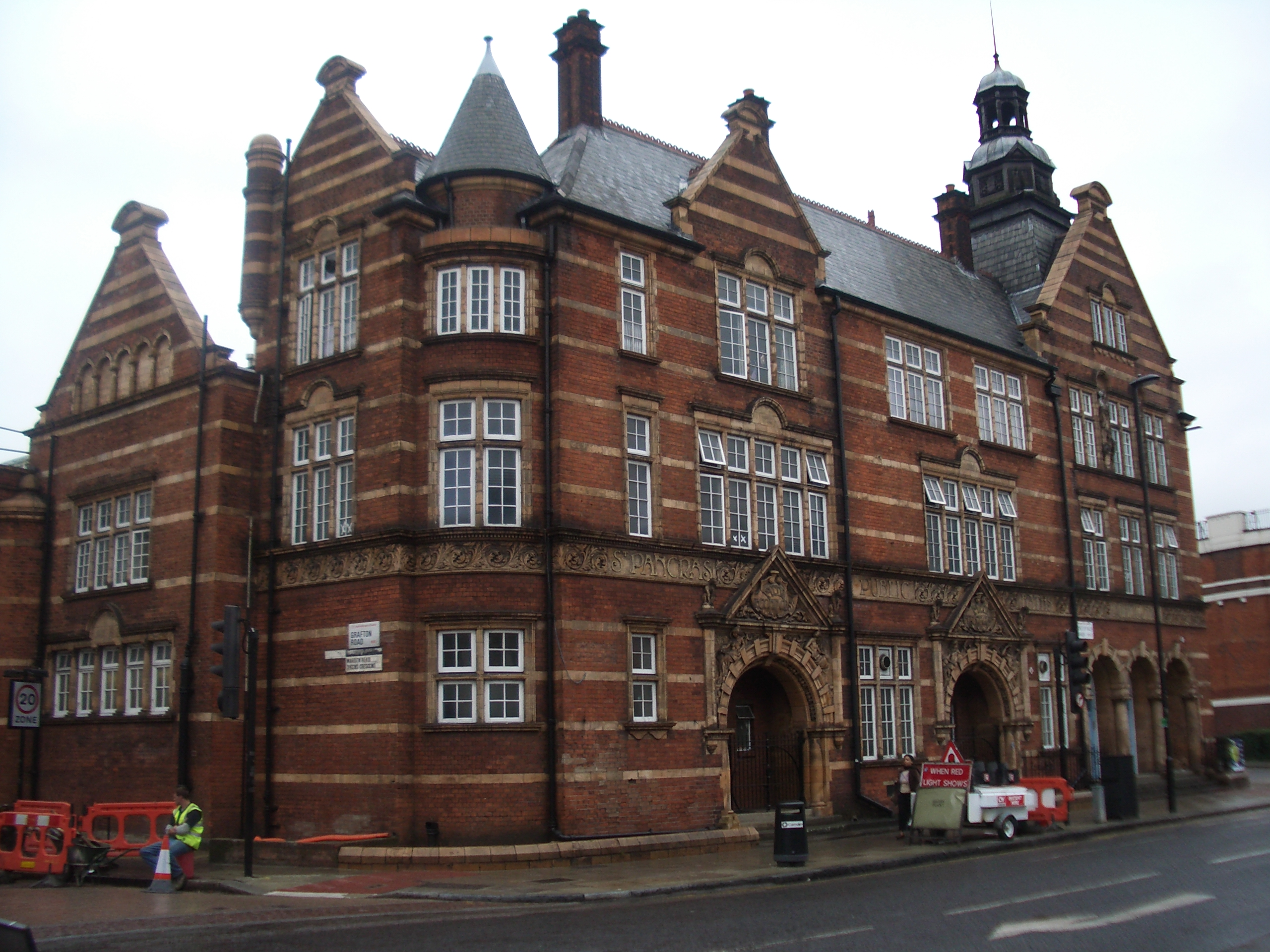
St Pancras Public Baths

The largest municipal building is the Kentish Town Sports Centre which opened as the St Pancras public baths in 1903, designed by Thomas W. Aldwinckle. The large complex originally had separate first and second class men's baths and a women's baths, along with a public hall. Little of the interior remains intact. The baths were closed in January 2007 for refurbishment and re-opened at the end of July 2010.

=== Kentish Town Health Centre ===
An architectural design competition was launched by RIBA Competitions and Camden Primary Care Trust and James Wigg Practice to design a new integrated care centre in Kentish Town that would deliver a flagship building, new models of care, enhance integrated working and provide a model for future delivery of primary care throughout the country. Through this process Architects AHMM were selected and the building opened in 2008 and has since been credited with a number of awards including the RIBA Award for Architecture 2009 and Building Magazine Public Building Project of the Year 2010.

=== Kentish Town Community Centre ===
Kentish Town Community Centre is a community centre, created in 2004, to provide meeting spaces and activities for local residents of all ages.

=== Kentish Town City Farm ===
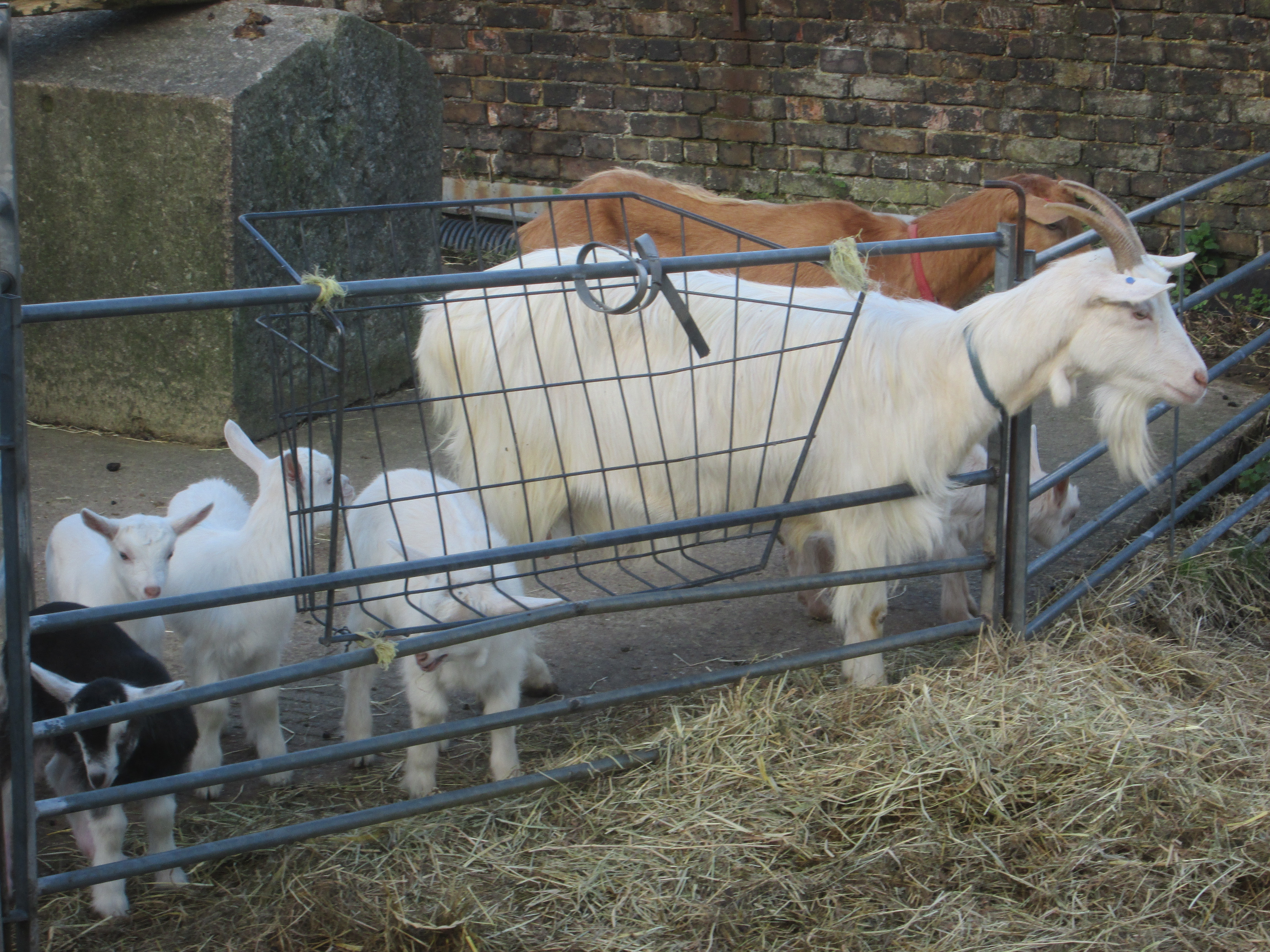
Goats at Kentish Town City Farm

Kentish Town City Farm at Cressfield Close was established in 1972. It was established with a goal of allowing local children to experience contact with animals and has animals like guinea pigs, rabbits and goats.

== Culture ==
Kentish Town graffiti

Pub rock is usually traced back to the "Tally Ho" in Kentish Town, a former jazz pub, where Eggs over Easy started playing in May 1971, and were soon joined by Bees Make Honey, Brinsley Schwarz, Max Merritt and the Meteors, Ducks Deluxe and others. The Assembly House is a Grade II listed pub at 292–294 Kentish Town Road.

Kentish Town is also home to The Forum (formerly known as the Town and Country club), during the 1950s a cinema, and now a live music venue. Spring 2014 saw Kentish Town to get its first speak easy, 1920s style hidden bar, when Knowhere Special opened its doors next to Kentish Town station.

Torriano Avenue, dating back to 1848, is a Kentish Town street home to Pete Stanley, one of the country's best-known bluegrass banjo players; British actor Bill Nighy; and The Torriano Poets, where local poets have met for over 20 years and still hold weekly public poetry readings on Sunday evenings: its founder was John Rety. The street is also home to two pubs, one being an 1850s hostelry The Leighton, the other The Torriano, which was for many years an old-fashioned community off-licence. They take their names from the local landowners, Sir David Leighton and Joshua Torriano, who developed the land for housing in the mid 19th century.

== Arts ==
Kentish Town is home to a number of visual arts organisations and galleries. The Camden Arts Centre, founded in 1965, is located on Arkwright Road on the edge of the district and presents contemporary art exhibitions, residencies and educational programmes. Since 2025, Camden Arts Projects has occupied the Grade II-listed former Wesleyan Methodist Chapel at 176 Prince of Wales Road, previously the London home of Zabludowicz Collection between 2007 and 2023. A non-profit arts organisation dedicated to contemporary visual art, commissioning exhibitions and public programmes, that contribute to the cultural life of Kentish Town and the wider London Borough of Camden.

== Notable residents ==
- Ben Aaronovitch, writer
- Akala, rapper
- Gerry Badger, photographer
- Mike Barson, keyboardist of the British pop/ska band Madness
- Kingsley Ben-Adir, actor
- Siân Berry, Green Party politician and 2008 Green Party candidate for London Mayor
- Archie Bland, journalist, writer and Deputy Editor of The Independent newspaper
- Phil Clifton, TV and radio presenter
- Giles Coren, restaurant critic
- Joe Craig, author of the Jimmy Coates series
- Charles Dance, actor
- Hunter Davies, writer
- Tony Fretton, architect
- Ben Goldacre, medical doctor and journalist
- Eddy Grant, reggae and rock artist
- William Harrison, popular tenor and actor
- Tom Hiddleston, actor
- Mr Hudson, singer
- Leigh Hunt, 19th century journalist and poet
- Daniel Kaluuya, actor
- Tim Key, comedian and poet
- Roger Lloyd-Pack, actor
- Katharine Sarah Macquoid, writer
- Karl Marx, 19th century political philosopher
- Tobias Menzies, actor
- Scott Mills, radio DJ
- Harry Mount, historian, barrister and journalist
- Mae Muller, singer-songwriter
- Henry Neele, poet
- Jimmie Nicol, former Beatles drummer
- Mohamed Nur, Mayor of Mogadishu
- George Orwell, writer
- Gareth Peirce, solicitor
- Lucy Porter, comedian
- The Roots, band
- Alan Rusbridger, editor of The Guardian newspaper
- Jon Snow, television journalist
- Keir Starmer, former Director of Public Prosecutions, since 2024 Prime Minister of the United Kingdom
- Victoria Starmer, spouse of the prime minister of the United Kingdom Keir Starmer
- Gillian Tindall, writer and historian
- Phoebe Waller-Bridge, writer/actress
- Astrid Zydower, sculptor

== Transport ==
Kentish Town has a range of transport connections: a mainline railway station that is served by Thameslink along with an interchange to the London Underground; Underground stations; London Overground connections (at Kentish Town West and Camden Road stations); and many bus routes, most of which go into or around Central London.

=== Bus routes ===
The following bus routes serve Kentish Town: 88 (24 hour), 134 (24 hour), 214 (24 hour), 393 and Night Bus Route N20.

=== Nearest stations ===
- Kentish Town station
- Gospel Oak railway station
- Kentish Town West railway station
- Camden Road railway station
- Camden Town tube station
- Caledonian Road tube station

== Neighbouring areas ==
- Camden Town and Chalk Farm to the south
- Barnsbury to the southeast
- Tufnell Park and Holloway to the east
- Dartmouth Park and Archway to the northeast
- Highgate to the north
- Hampstead and Belsize Park to the west
