= Camden Town tube station =

London Underground station

Camden Town
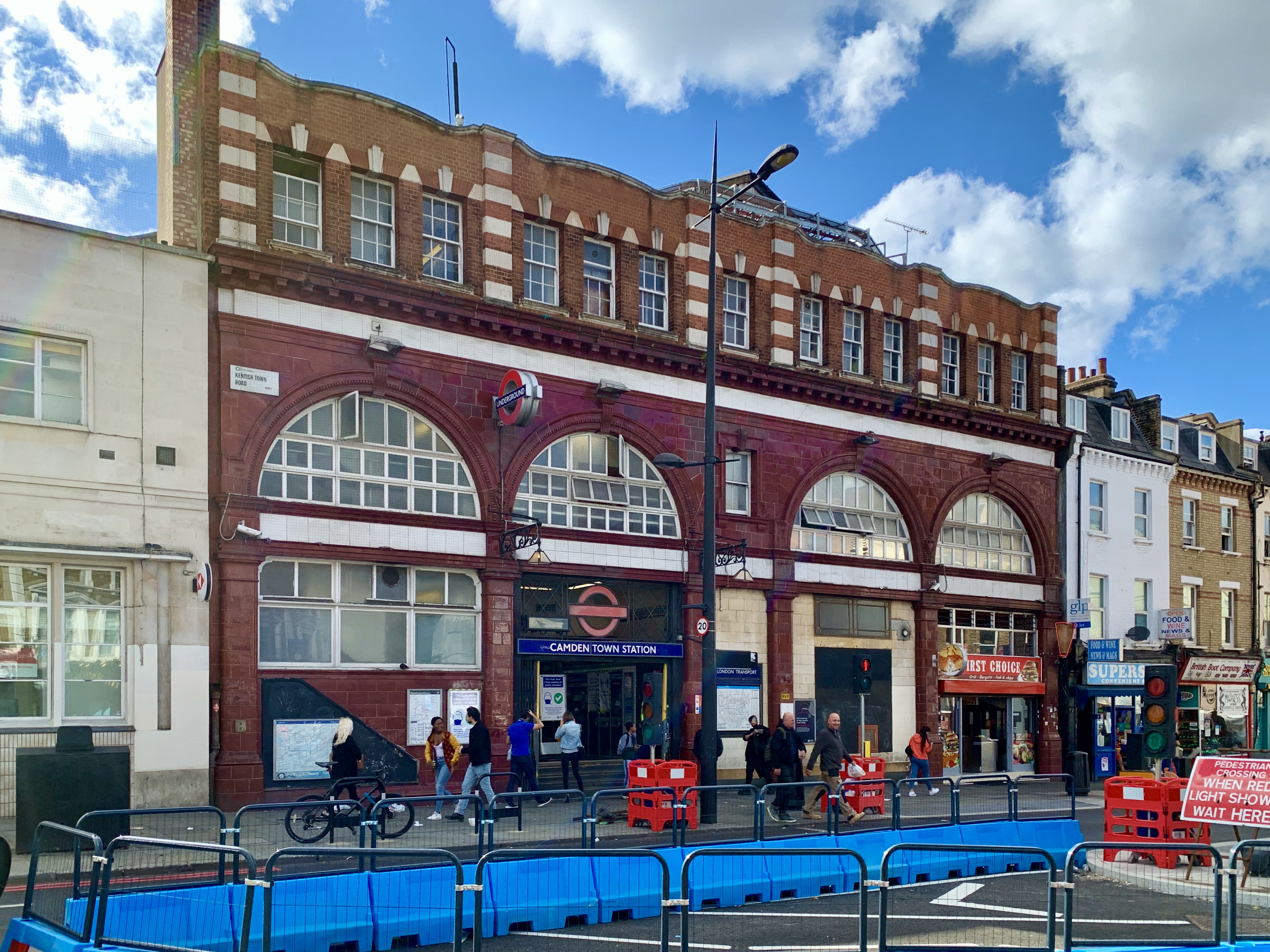
- Camden Town station
- Interactive map of Camden Town

General information
- Location: Camden Town
- Local authority: London Borough of Camden
- Managed by: London Underground
- Number of platforms: 4
- Fare zone: 2
- OSI: Camden Road

London Underground annual entry and exit
- 2021: ▲9.12 million
- 2022: ▲17.34 million
- 2023: ▲18.81 million
- 2024: ▼17.98 million
- 2025: ▼17.16 million

Railway companies
- Original company: Charing Cross, Euston and Hampstead Railway

Key dates
- 22 June 1907: Station opened
- 20 April 1924: Link from Euston (C&SLR) opened

Other information
- External links: TfL station info page
- Coordinates: 51.5394°N 0.1427°W

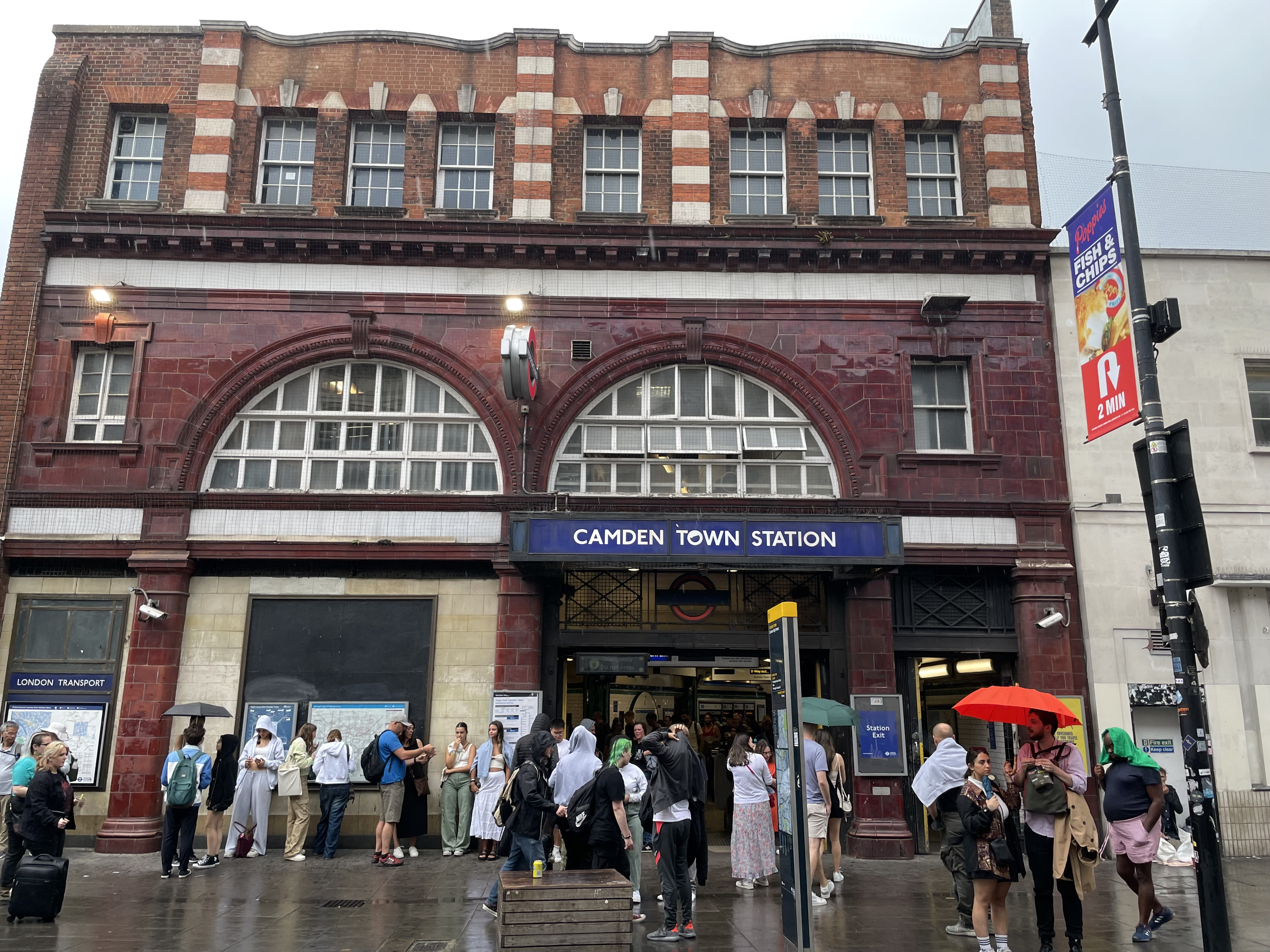
Camden Town Tube station entrance viewed from Camden High Street

Camden Town is a London Underground station in Camden Town, London. It is on the Northern line as well as a major junction for the line, as it is where the Edgware and High Barnet branches merge from the north, and is also where they split to the south into the Bank and Charing Cross branches for the journey through Central London. It is particularly busy with visitors to the Camden markets at weekends, and, until 2019, was exit-only on Sundays to prevent overcrowding.

Northbound, the next stations are Chalk Farm on the Edgware branch and Kentish Town on the High Barnet branch. Southbound, the next stations are Euston on the Bank branch and Mornington Crescent on the Charing Cross branch. The station is in London fare zone 2.

== History ==
=== Charing Cross, Euston and Hampstead Railway ===
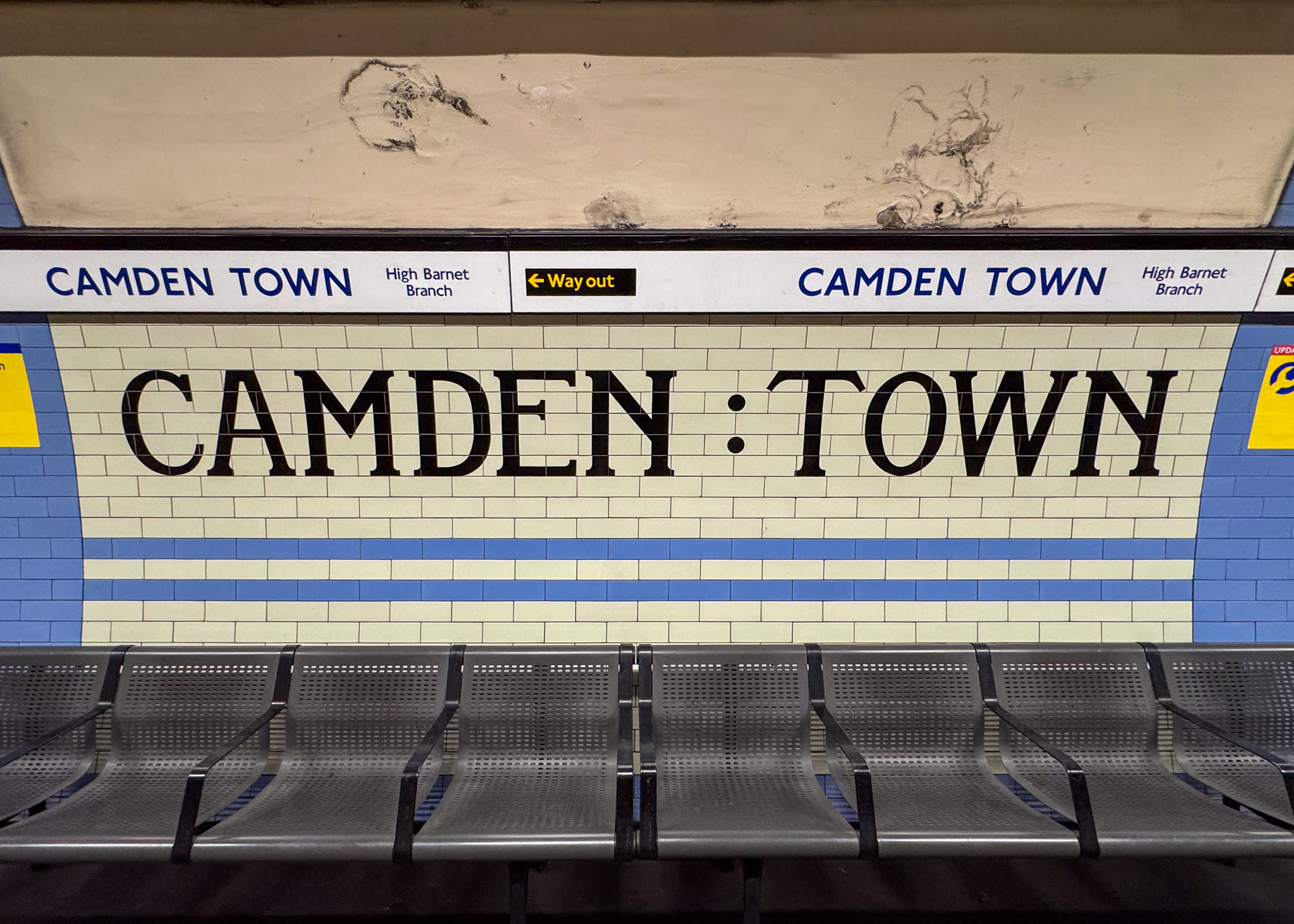
The distinctive Art Nouveau tiling on the station platforms

The station was first proposed as part of the original route of the Charing Cross, Euston and Hampstead Railway (CCE&HR) (now part of the Northern line). Proposals for the line had existed since 1893, but construction did not begin until the American entrepreneur Charles Tyson Yerkes invested in the line in October 1900. Work started in July 1902, and the station was opened on 22 June 1907 by David Lloyd George, then President of the Board of Trade. The line here branched into two routes, to Hampstead and to Highgate. The line to Hampstead (now the Edgware branch) is under Chalk Farm Road; the line to Highgate (now the High Barnet branch) is under Kentish Town Road. With the narrowness of the roads above, and the necessity to keep directly beneath them to avoid having to pay compensation to landowners during construction, on both branches the northbound platform is directly above the southbound one. The two roads meet at an angle of 35° forcing the station into an unusual V shape. The surface building was designed by the Underground Electric Railways Company of London's (UERL's) architect Leslie Green.

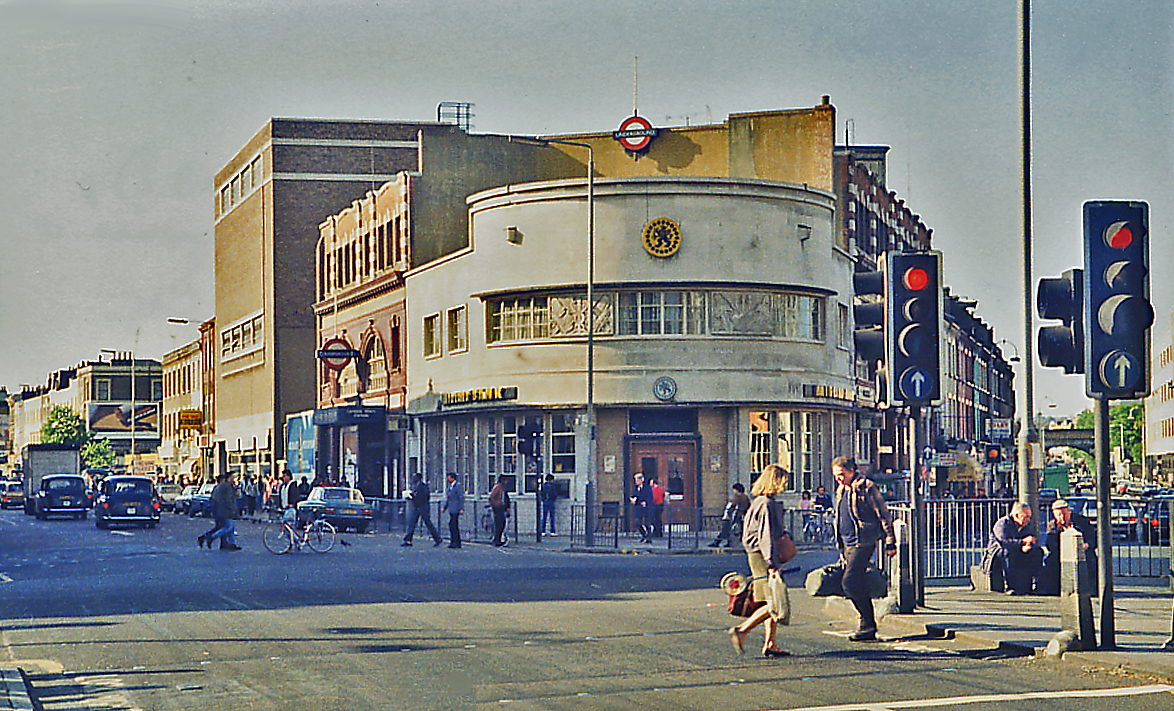
The station from Camden High Street in 1984

At the apex of the V was a junction allowing northbound trains to take either of the branches north, and likewise allow the trains south from the branches to join the single southbound track under Camden High Street. This resulted in four connecting tunnels. When the CCE&HR and City & South London Railway (C&SLR) lines were joined together after the C&SLR became part of the Underground Group on 1 January 1913, a short extension was planned from the Euston terminus of the City & South London Railway to connect with the CCE&HR south of Camden Town station allowing services to run from both City and West End branches to and from the Hampstead and Highgate branches. City branch services were extended to this station on 20 April 1924. The work required to join the two lines together at Camden Town was one of the most ambitious projects in the history of the Underground, and was undertaken without disrupting any existing services. This was partly carried out by a sort of sidling effect to get the tunnels to align, with a series of intertwined tubes inserted. It added another four tunnels that allows trains to proceed to or from either the Edgware or High Barnet branch on to or off both the City or Charing Cross branch without following conflicting paths. The multiple junction tunnels are effectively located beneath Camden High Street.

The original lifts and emergency stairs to the platforms were inside the vertex of the V, leading to four passageways, one to each of the platforms, with return passageways back to the lifts. With growing patronage and increasing congestion the lifts were later replaced by escalators that came into service on 7 October 1929 with an escalator heading from the station building to a circulating area at the northern end of the platforms. This has only two pairs of parallel passageways, one for each branch (northbound), with a small side passage on each leading to the lower southbound platforms. One set of the original lift passageways became part of the ventilation system, but the remaining one adds to the confusion of the station.

=== Northern line ===
The line, known post-merger for many years as the 'Edgware - Morden' line, was formally referred to as the Northern line from 28 August 1937.

The station was damaged by a bomb on 14 October 1940 during the Blitz. One person was killed. Shortly afterwards, Camden Town was chosen as one of eight stations on the Northern line where dedicated air-raid shelters would be constructed alongside the line, capable of accommodating 640,000 people.

=== 2003 derailment ===
On 19 October 2003, the last carriage of a 1995 stock train derailed on the approach to the station while traversing points in the connecting tunnels that connect the various Northern line branches. Seven passengers were injured, six of them with minor injuries. Two carriages were seriously damaged by the impact. After the accident, trains were restricted to travelling either from the Edgware branch to the Bank branch or from the High Barnet branch to the Charing Cross branch. Full use of the junction was restored in March 2004.

Following the derailment, a joint report by London Underground and its maintenance contractor Tube Lines concluded that poor track geometry was the main cause of the derailment. Extra friction arising out of striations (scratches) on a newly installed set of points had allowed the leading wheel of the last carriage to climb the rail and therefore derail. The track at the derailment site is on a very tight bend in a tight tunnel bore, which prevents canting the track by dipping the height of one rail relative to the other, the normal solution in this sort of situation.

=== Future expansion and upgrade ===
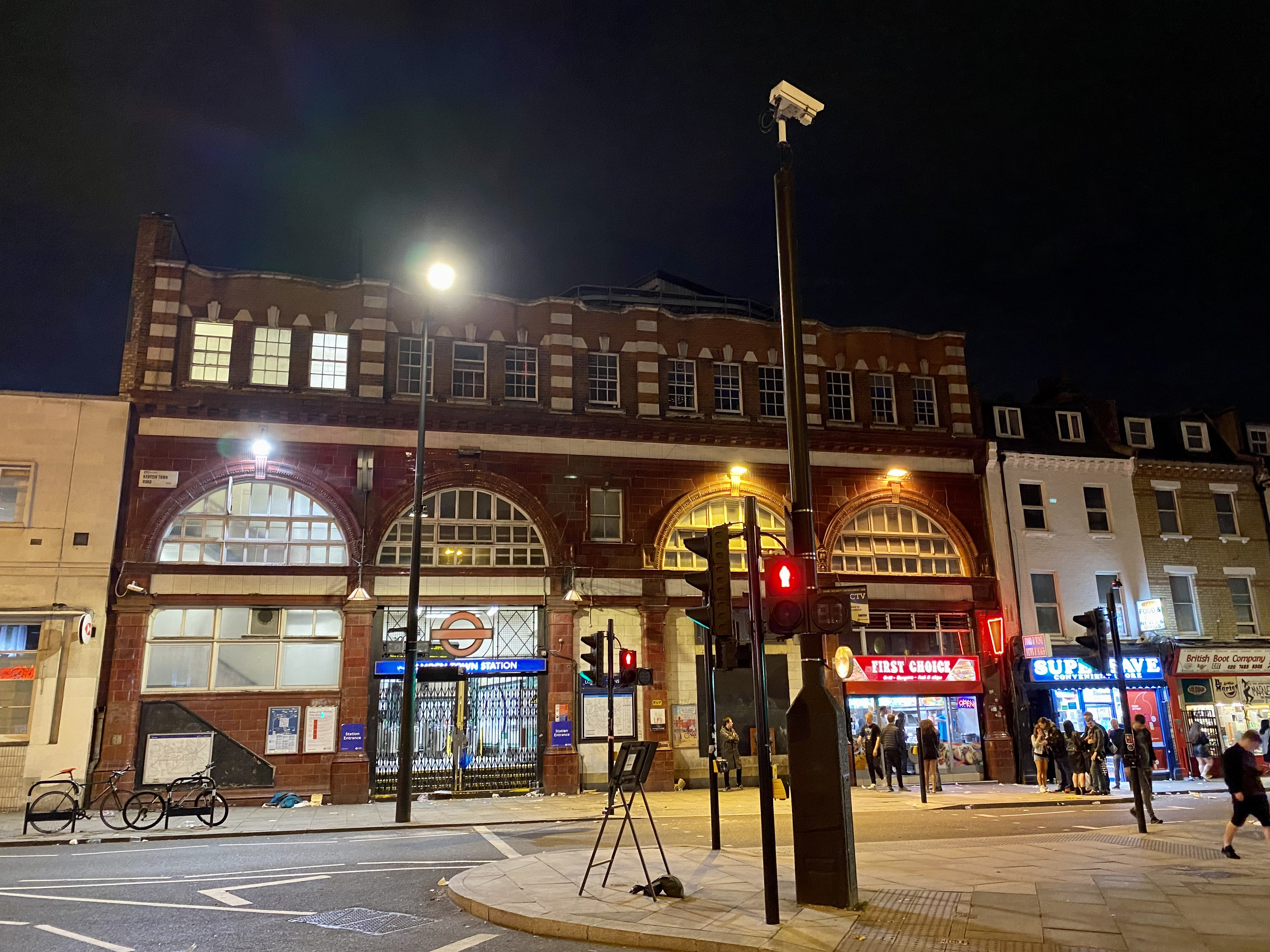
The Kentish Town road entrance at night

The station is too small for current passenger demand, with just two escalators and too few passageways between Northern line platforms. The station is particularly busy at weekends with tourists visiting Camden Market and Camden High Street, with entry to the station prohibited on Sunday afternoons to prevent overcrowding on the station's narrow platforms. A 2017 consultation suggested that by 2021, weekday passenger demand at the station was expected to grow by 40 per cent.

London Underground originally submitted redevelopment plans in the early 2000s, a £130m project that would have eased congestion and provided step free access – with residential and office development above the new station. However, the project involved demolition of all buildings between Buck Street, Camden High Street and Kentish Town Road – including Buck Street Market, Electric Ballroom and the ox-blood tiled Leslie Green station building itself. London Underground's reasoning was that land was required for a temporary entrance for the station while the new station was built. Complaints regarding the loss of these buildings and the market – as well as complaints regarding out-of-place and out-of-scale development when compared to the remainder of Camden Town – led to a public inquiry, which was held in 2004. In 2005, Transport for London had their Transport and Works Act order refused by the office of the Deputy Prime Minister and the scheme was subsequently cancelled.

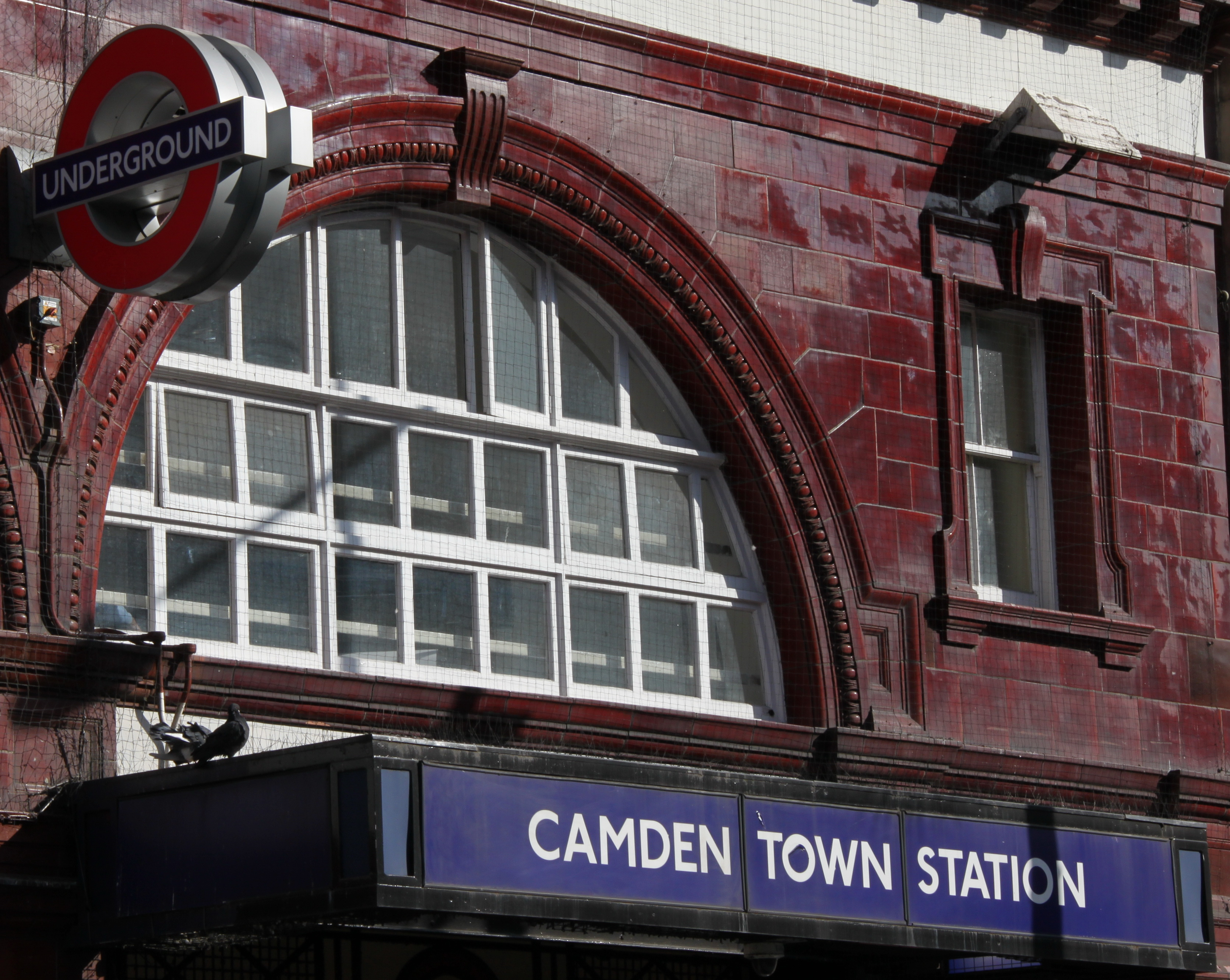
The distinctive red tiled facade of the station

In 2013, TfL announced new redevelopment plans given the continuing congestion and high passenger demand at the station. Instead of the previously aborted scheme, TfL proposed a new station building built on the north side of Buck Street, on the site of the vacated Hawley School, avoiding the need to demolish both the original station and the other previously-threatened buildings. As well as this new station entrance, expansion work would take place throughout the station with new escalators and passageways and step-free access - tripling the size of the station. In the 2017 consultation, construction work was estimated to take four years to complete. In 2018, following the delays to Crossrail and the knock on effects on TfL's business plan, the station upgrade was placed on hold indefinitely.

== Station layout ==
As one of only three stations where transfers between the Bank and Charing Cross branches are possible and the northern of the two junctions between them, Camden Town features a complex platform arrangement. Like its sister station of Kennington, the station has four platforms with cross-platform interchanges available between the branches.

However, unlike at Kennington, since trains do not terminate at Camden Town there are no terminus platforms or loop to allow terminating trains to turn around. Instead, all northbound trains heading towards Edgware use platform 1 and those heading towards High Barnet or Mill Hill East use platform 3. Trains heading southbound to either central branch use platforms 2 if coming from Edgware and 4 if coming from High Barnet or Mill Hill East respectively.

== Connections ==
=== Out-of-station interchange ===
Camden Road station is located 450 metres north-east of the station for London Overground services to Stratford, Hackney, Gospel Oak and Richmond.

=== Buses ===
London Buses routes 1, 24, 27, 29, 31, 88, 134, 214, 253, 274 and night routes N5, N20, N27, N28, N29, N31, N253 and N279 serve the station. Route 46 passes nearby.

== Air raid shelter ==
Camden Town is one of eight London Underground stations with a deep-level air-raid shelter underneath it. The entrances are on Buck Street (near the market) and Underhill Street with the shelter tunnels reaching from just north of Hawley Crescent to south of Greenland Street.

== Nearby places ==
- Camden Town
- Chalk Farm
- Kentish Town
- Regent's Park
- London Zoo
- Somers Town

Preceding station	London Underground	Following station
Kentish Town High Barnet branch towards Mill Hill East or High Barnet	Northern line	Euston Bank branch towards Morden via Bank
Chalk Farm Edgware branch towards Edgware	Northern line	Mornington Crescent Charing Cross branch towards Battersea Power Station, Morden or Kennington via Charing Cross
Out of system interchange
Preceding station	London Overground	Following station
Kentish Town West towards Clapham Junction or Richmond	Mildmay line North London line and West London line transfer at Camden Road	Caledonian Road & Barnsbury towards Stratford
Former Route
Preceding station	London Underground	Following station
South Kentish Town towards Highgate	Northern line (1907–1923)	Mornington Crescent towards Charing Cross
Chalk Farm towards Golders Green	Northern line (1907–1923)	Mornington Crescent towards Charing Cross
