= South Kentish Town tube station =

Former railway station in England

South Kentish Town
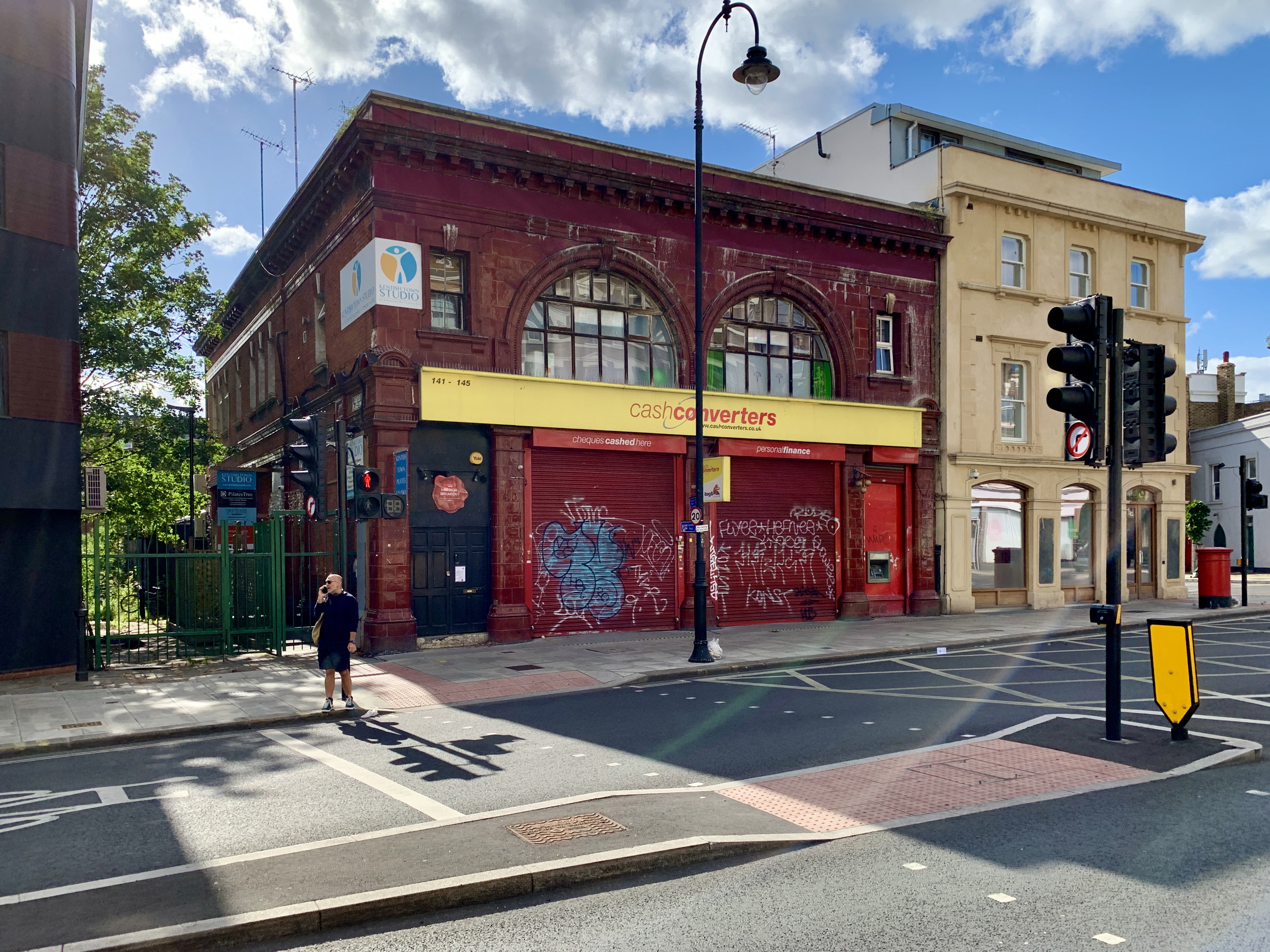
- The station building in 2020, now a Cashies
- Interactive map of South Kentish Town

General information
- Location: Kentish Town
- Local authority: Camden
- Number of platforms: 2

Railway companies
- Original company: Charing Cross, Euston & Hampstead Railway

Key dates
- 22 June 1907: Opened
- 5 June 1924: Closed

Other information
- Coordinates: 51.54528°N 0.14167°W

South Kentish Town is a disused London Underground station located in Kentish Town, north London, on the High Barnet branch of the Northern line.

It was opened in 1907 by the Charing Cross, Euston & Hampstead Railway but closed in 1924 due to low passenger usage. Latterly, it was on what is now the Northern line's High Barnet branch between Camden Town and Kentish Town stations. The surface building survives on Kentish Town Road near its junction with Castle Road and is currently a retail unit.

== History ==
South Kentish Town station was opened on 22 June 1907 by the Charing Cross, Euston & Hampstead Railway (CCE&HR) on its branch to Highgate (now Archway). The station was planned to be called Castle Road; however, this was changed just before it opened. The Castle Road name had already been fired into the original Leslie Green tiles inside the station, so after the name change they were painted over with the revised name.

On 20 April 1924, trains of the City & South London Railway began to call at the station as the connection between the CCE&HR and C&SLR at Camden Town allowed the C&SLR to extend its services northwards along the CCE&HR's northern branches. This situation would only last for seven weeks. The station was temporarily closed following unofficial strike action at Lots Road Power Station during the afternoon of 5 June 1924. It was decided not to re-open the station after the power was restored, due to the very low number of passengers using it; in fact, since as early as 1908 some trains did not stop there. During the Blitz in the Second World War it was adapted for use as an air-raid shelter.

There have been occasional proposals to rebuild the platforms and the station as part of the redevelopment plans for Camden Town. The layout of South Kentish Town is similar to Kentish Town (also originally a CCE&HR station); with two 23 ft (7.0 m) diameter lift-shafts and an 18 ft (5.5 m) diameter spiral staircase. South Kentish Town now serves as an access point for permanent way works and as an emergency egress point for passenger services.

A 1951 short story called South Kentish Town by John Betjeman told the fictional story of a passenger who became trapped in the disused station. It was based on a true incident where a train stopped at the station and mistakenly opened its doors, but in reality nobody became trapped.

As of 2016, the station building housed a retail unit and a yoga studio. From 2021, it contained three escape rooms themed to its heritage as both a former Underground station (with the aforementioned John Betjeman story being a crucial plot point) and a World War 2 air-raid shelter.

== Services ==
Former service
Preceding station	London Underground	Following station
Kentish Town towards Archway	Hampstead Tube Archway branch (June 1907–April 1924)	Camden Town towards Kennington
Kentish Town towards Archway	Northern line Archway branch (April–June 1924)	Camden Town towards Kennington
