= Kentish Town rail accident =

1861 train crash in London

Coordinates: 51°33′08″N 0°08′49″W

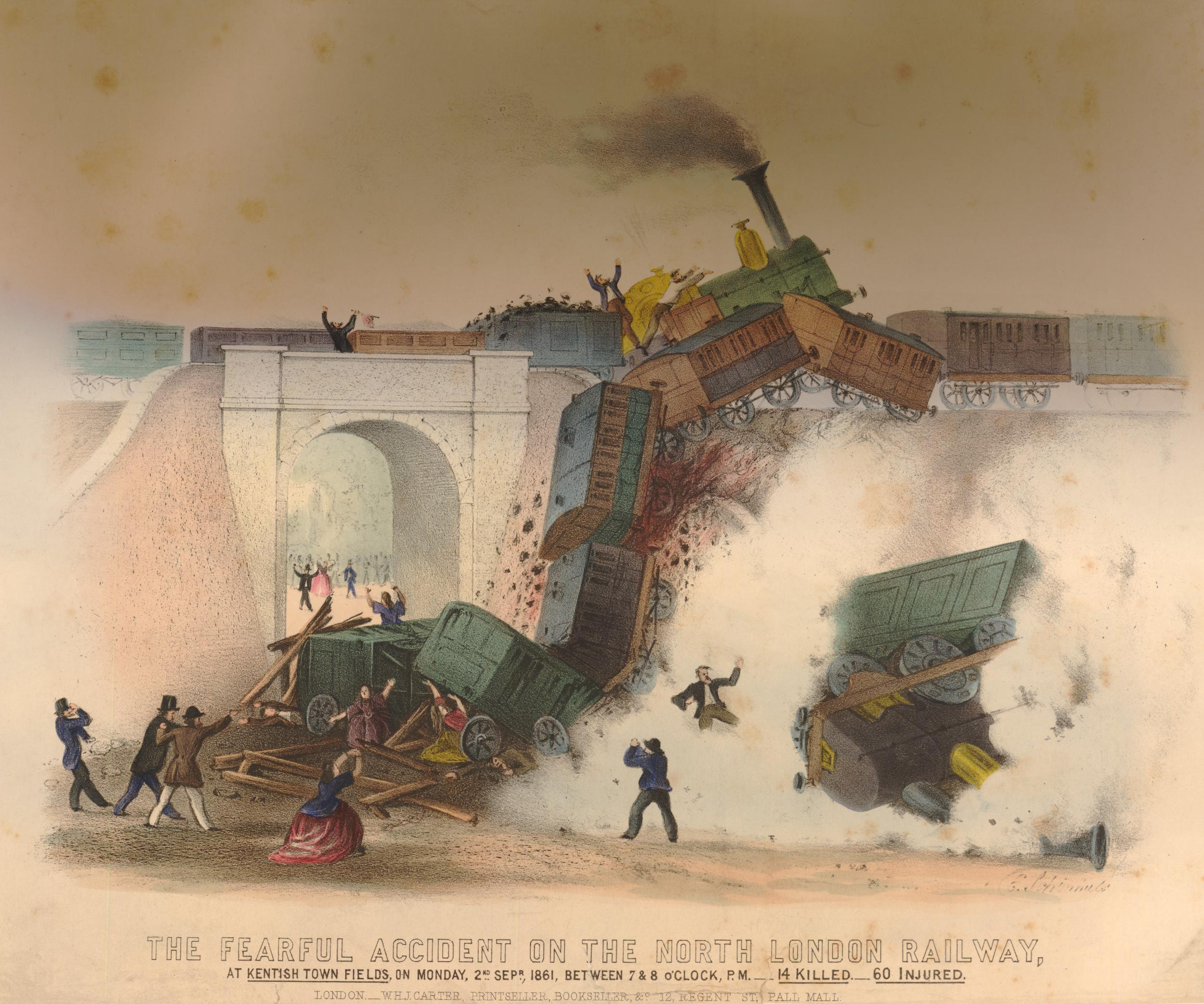
- Drawing of the accident

Details
- Date: 2 September 1861
- Location: Kentish Town station
- Country: England
- Line: Hampstead Junction Railway
- Cause: Signalling error

Statistics
- Trains: 2
- Deaths: 16
- Injured: 317 (20 seriously)

On 2 September 1861, near Kentish Town station in London, 16 people were killed and 317 were injured when an excursion train operated by the North London Railway collided with a freight train operated by the London and North Western Railway.

The excursion train was running early and had been given permission to proceed, but met the freight train as it crossed the lines at a freight sidings unprotected by signals.
