= Assembly House, Kentish Town =

Pub in Kentish Town, London

Coordinates: 51°33′3.4″N 0°8′25.4″W

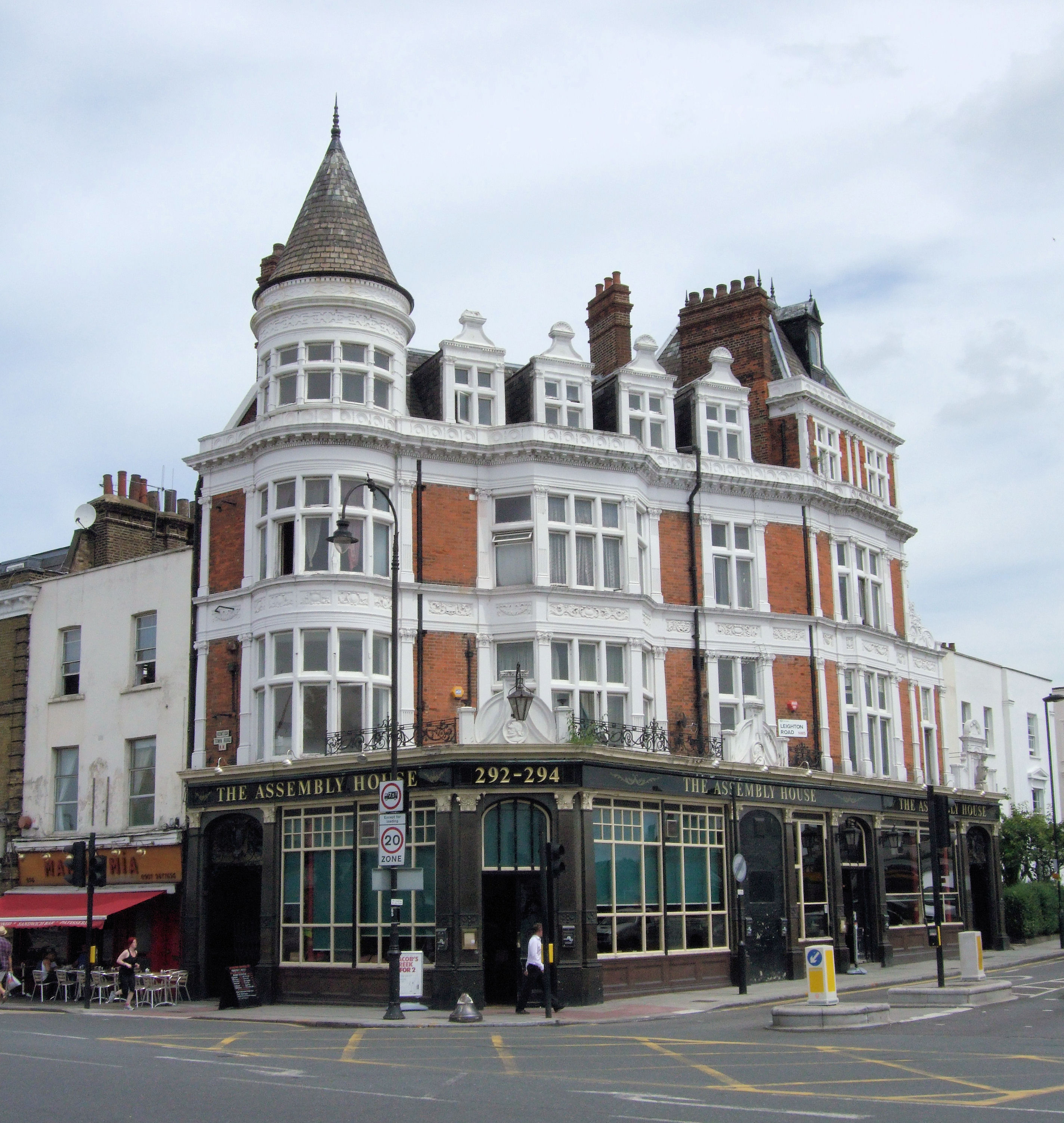
The Assembly House

The Assembly House is a Grade II listed public house at 292–294 Kentish Town Road, Kentish Town, London.

It was built in 1898 by Thorpe and Furniss.
