= Kentish Town station =

London Underground and railway station

Kentish Town
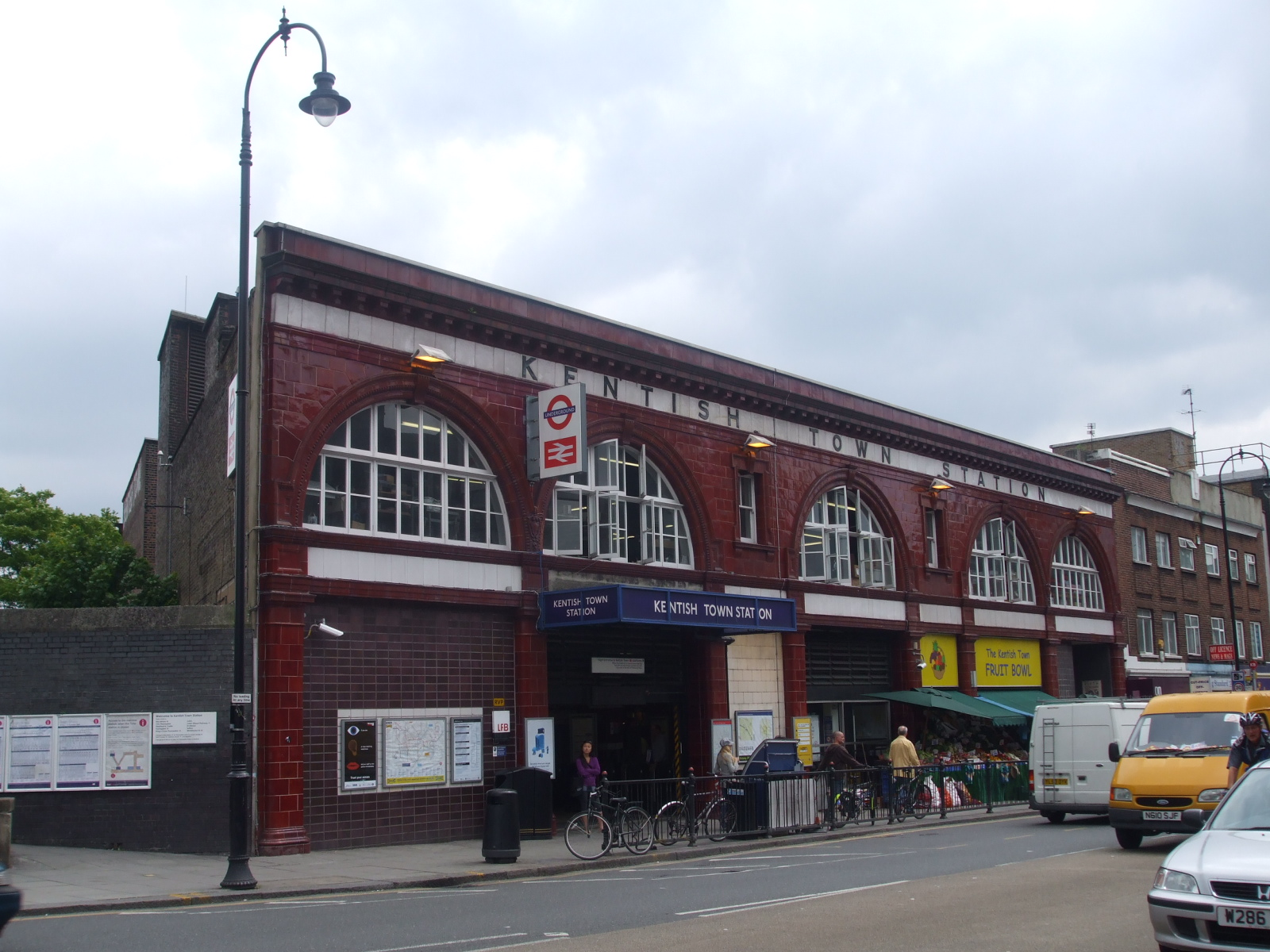
- Kentish Town station
- Interactive map of Kentish Town

General information
- Location: Kentish Town
- Local authority: London Borough of Camden
- Managed by: London Underground
- Station code: KTN
- DfT category: F1
- Number of platforms: National Rail: 4 (3 in use); London Underground: 2
- Fare zone: 2
- OSI: Kentish Town West

London Underground annual entry and exit
- 2021: ▲3.71 million
- 2022: ▲6.30 million
- 2023: ▼0.00 million
- 2024: 0.00 million
- 2025: ▼6.38 million

National Rail annual entry and exit
- 2020–21: ▼0.779 million
- 2021–22: ▲1.499 million
- 2022–23: ▲1.992 million
- 2023–24: ▼1.787 million
- 2024–25: ▲2.590 million

Key dates
- 1 October 1868: Opened (Midland)
- 22 June 1907: Opened (CCE&HR)

Other information
- External links: TfL station info page; Departures; Facilities
- Coordinates: 51.5504°N 0.1406°W

Kentish Town is an interchange station in Kentish Town in the London Borough of Camden for London Underground and National Rail services. It is at the junction of Kentish Town Road (A400) and Leighton Road. It is in London fare zone 2.

The London Underground station is on the High Barnet branch of the Northern line. The National Rail station is served by Thameslink on the Midland Main Line. It is the only station on the High Barnet branch with a direct interchange with a National Rail line. An Out of Station Interchange (OSI) with Kentish Town West on the North London line is not charged as two separate journeys in electronic journey charging.

== History ==
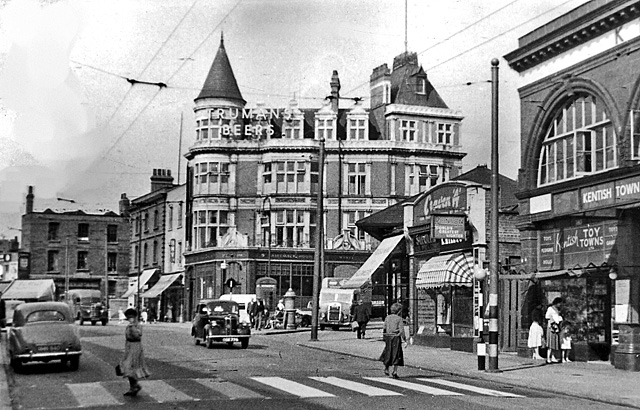
The entrance on Kentish Town Road in 1955

The first station was opened by the Midland Railway on 1 October 1868 on the extension to its new London terminal at St Pancras. Prior to that, Midland Railway trains used the London and North Western Railway lines to Euston or the Great Northern Railway lines to King's Cross. Until the St. Pancras extension was complete, and for some time afterwards, some trains exchanged locomotive at Kentish Town for one fitted with condensing apparatus and continued to Moorgate station, then named Moorgate Street station. For some years trains ran from Kentish Town to Victoria station on the South Eastern and Chatham Railway.

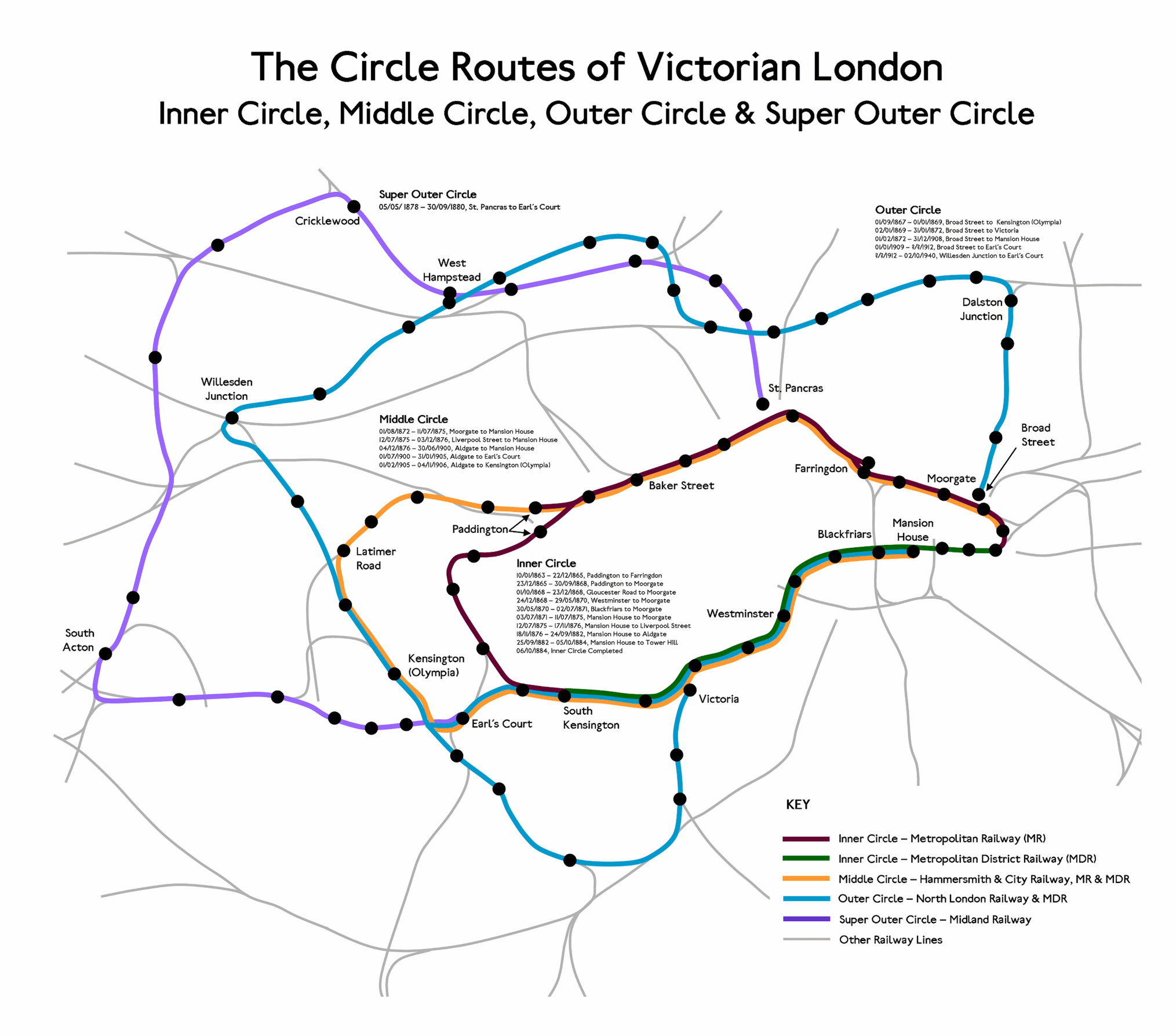
The Victorian Super Outer Circle route, passing through Kentish Town station

The second largest motive power depot and repair facility on the Midland Rail was north of the station. In 1861 a collision at a siding near the station killed 16 people and injured 317.

From May 1878 to September 1880 the MR Super Outer Circle service ran through the station, from St. Pancras to Earl's Court Underground station via Cricklewood and South Acton. The main line station was rebuilt in 1983; nothing of the original station building remains. The separate London Underground station was opened on 22 June 1907 by the Charing Cross, Euston and Hampstead Railway (CCE&HR), a precursor of the Northern line. The station was designed by Leslie Green with the ox-blood red glazed terracotta façade and the semi-circular windows at first floor level common to most of the original stations on the CCE&HR and its two associated railways, the Baker Street and Waterloo Railway and Great Northern, Piccadilly and Brompton Railway which opened the previous year. When Kentish Town station opened the next CCE&HR station south was South Kentish Town, which closed in 1924 due to low usage. Gospel Oak station on the North London line opened in 1860 as "Kentish Town", but was given its present name in 1867 when the North London Railway opened Kentish Town West. It was the junction of services to Barking until 1981, when services were diverted to terminate and start from Gospel Oak. The spur line to Junction Road Junction was then closed, the track was removed, and the trackbed sold for industrial use.

In April 2023, Transport for London (TfL) announced that the Underground station would be closed for "up to a year" from 26 June 2023 to allow the two escalators to be replaced by the same up-to-date model as those used on the Elizabeth line. The escalators had been custom-designed for the station in 1997, but later caused long closures due to unavailability of custom spare parts following breakdowns. The station was also refurbished during the closure; extensive repairs were made to the ceiling and floor of the ticket hall, and more ticket barriers were installed. During the closure, Underground platform roundels were changed from "KENTISH TOWN" to "STATION CLOSED", and entrances were chained off. The railway station remained open.

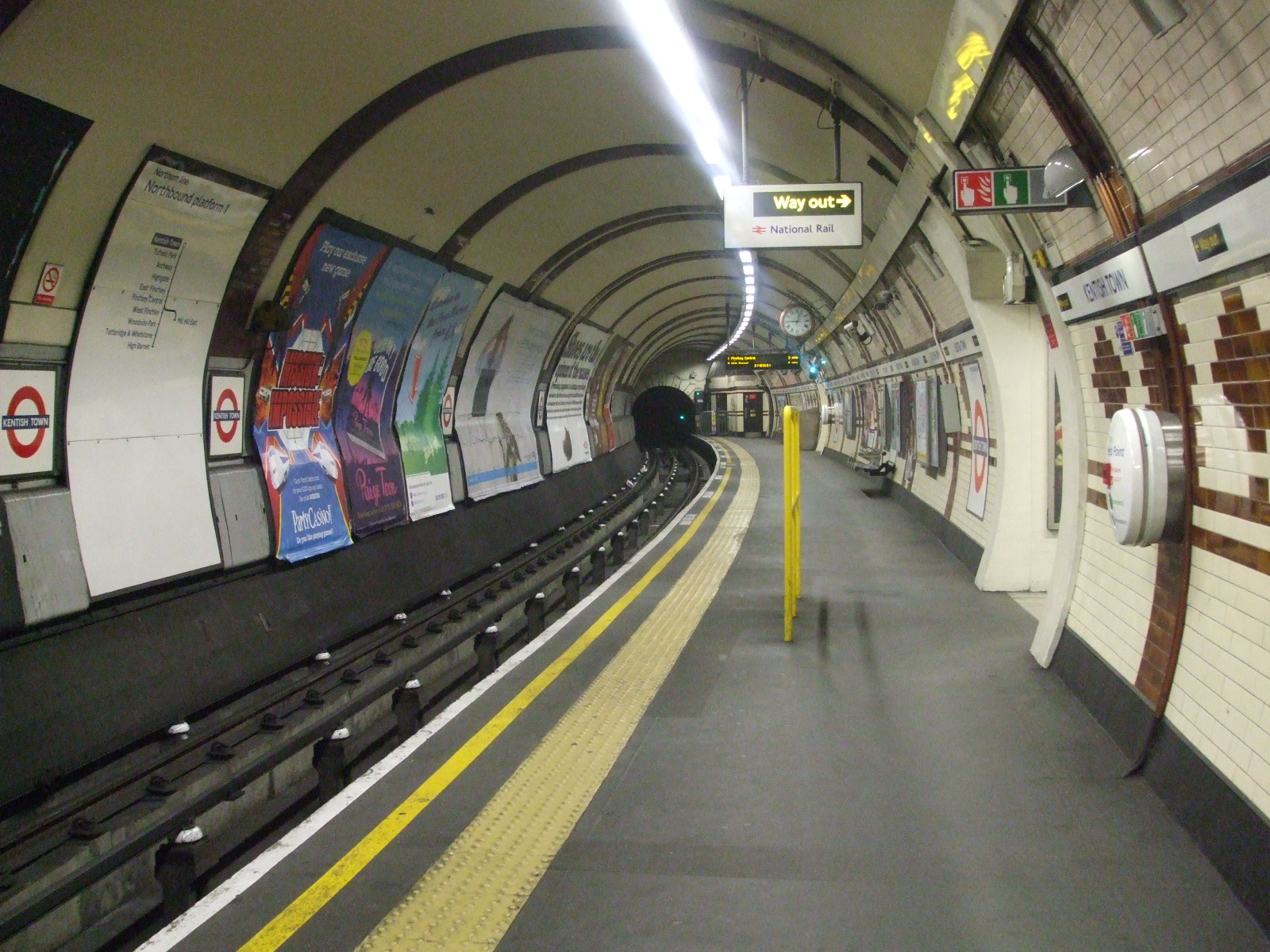
The station's Northern line northbound platform

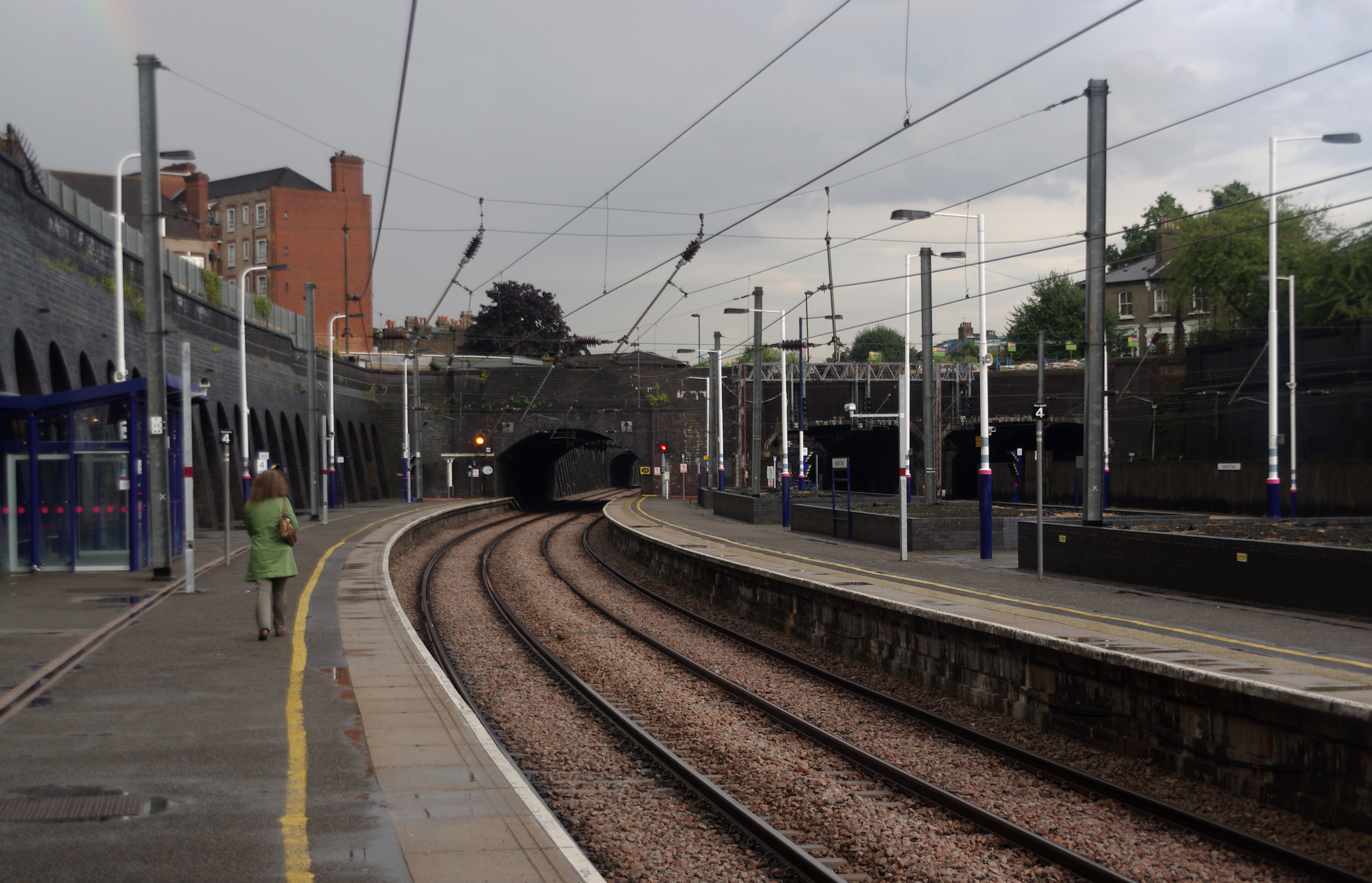
National Rail platforms at the station

The station re-opened on 23 December 2024, six months behind schedule. The new escalators have an expected life of 40 years.

== Design ==
=== National Rail station ===
There are 6 tracks and 4 platforms at this station in northwest–southeast orientation.

Starting from the easternmost platform:

- Platforms 1 and 2 are Thameslink platforms in regular use, where all Thameslink trains accessing the core pass through, although most do not stop.
- Platforms 3 (which forms an island with platform 2) and 4 are on the slow lines of the Midland Main Line, which are normally used only by terminating services or a handful of Sunday morning services.
- The fast lines of the Midland Main Line pass through the station in both directions without stopping.

Normal access to the National Rail station is from the Underground station; the direct street entrance is only open when the Underground station is closed.

=== London Underground station ===
There are 2 platforms at this station, Platform 1 heading northbound and Platform 2 heading southbound.

== Location ==
On the London Underground, the station is between Tufnell Park and Camden Town stations. On National Rail, it is between West Hampstead Thameslink and St Pancras International stations.

== Services ==
=== National Rail ===
National Rail services at Kentish Town are operated by Thameslink using Class 700 EMUs.

The typical off-peak service is:

- 4 trains per hour to St Albans City
- 4 trains per hour to Sutton (2 of these run via Mitcham Junction and 2 run via Wimbledon)

During peak hours additional services to and from Luton, Orpington and Rainham, and some late evening services to and from Bedford, stop at the station.

The station is also served by a night service between Bedford and Three Bridges on Sunday to Friday nights.

=== London Underground ===
The London Underground service frequency on the Northern line in trains per hour at the off-peak period of 19:00–20:00 as of January 2015 is:

- 14 tph to High Barnet
- 4 tph to Mill Hill East
- 8 tph to Battersea Power Station via Charing Cross
- 8 tph to Morden via Bank

The station is also served by a night service on Friday and Saturday nights as part of the Night Tube. The station is served by a train every 15 minutes between High Barnet and Morden via Charing Cross.

| Preceding station | National Rail | Following station |
|---|---|---|
| West Hampstead Thameslink | Thameslink Midland Main Line | St Pancras |
| Preceding station | London Underground | Following station |
| Tufnell Park towards High Barnet or Mill Hill East | Northern line High Barnet branch | Camden Town towards Battersea Power Station, Morden or Kennington |
Historical railways
| Haverstock Hill Line open, station closed | Midland Railway Midland Main Line | Camden Road (Midland) Line open, station closed |
| Terminus | Great Eastern Railway Tottenham and Hampstead Junction Railway | Highgate Road Line open, station closed |
Former services
| Preceding station | London Underground | Following station |
| Tufnell Park towards Highgate | Northern line (1907–24) | South Kentish Town towards Charing Cross or Clapham Common |

== Connections ==
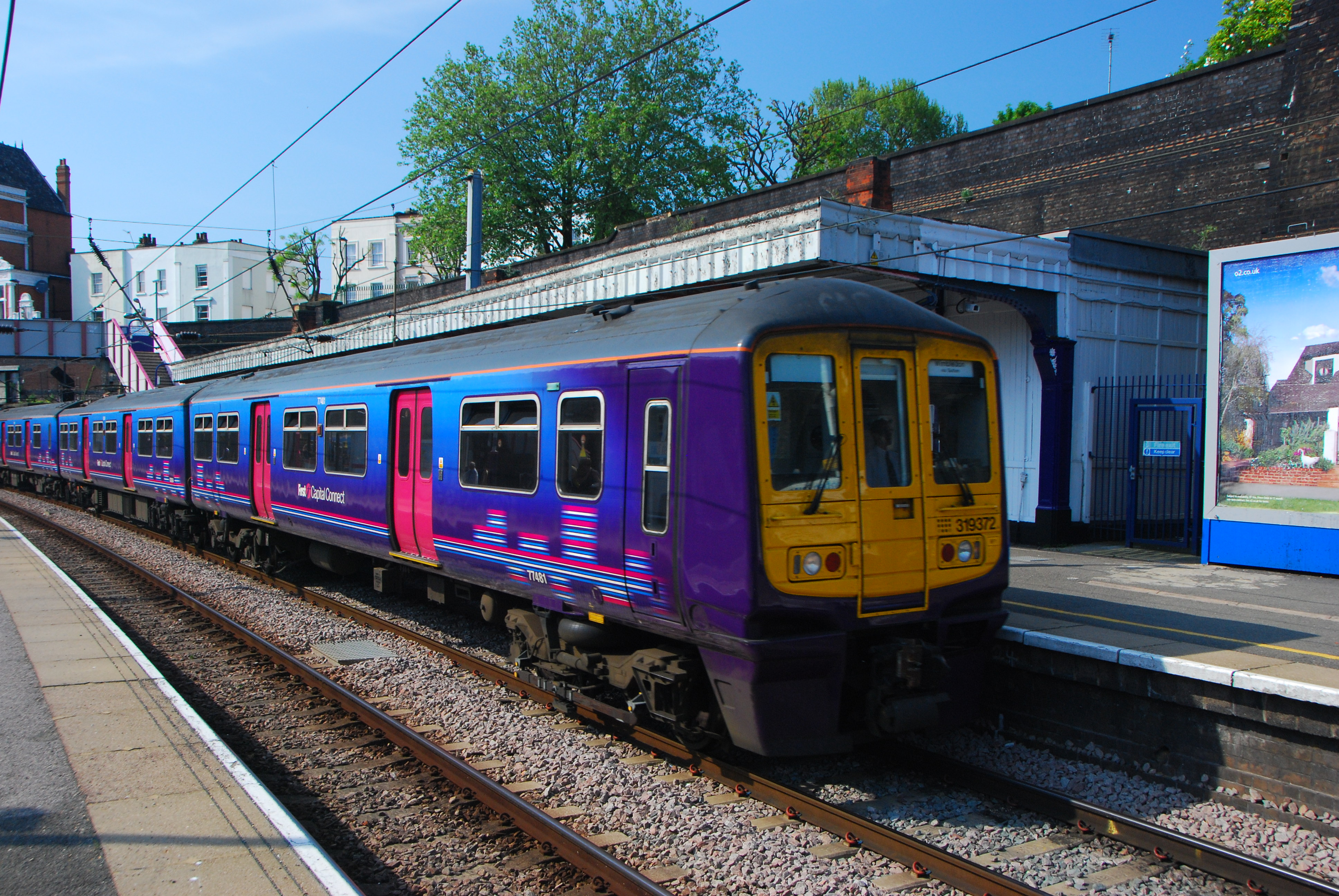
First Capital Connect train with a southbound Thameslink service.

London Buses routes 88, 134, 214, 393 and night route N20 serve the station.

== Incidents ==
On 21 August 2020 a man was hospitalised after he was hit by the TfL and British Rail sign, which fell off the façade of the entrance to Kentish Town station in high winds. The sign had been reported as looking as if it was about to fall, but no action had been taken.
