= London Buses route 134 =

London bus route

134
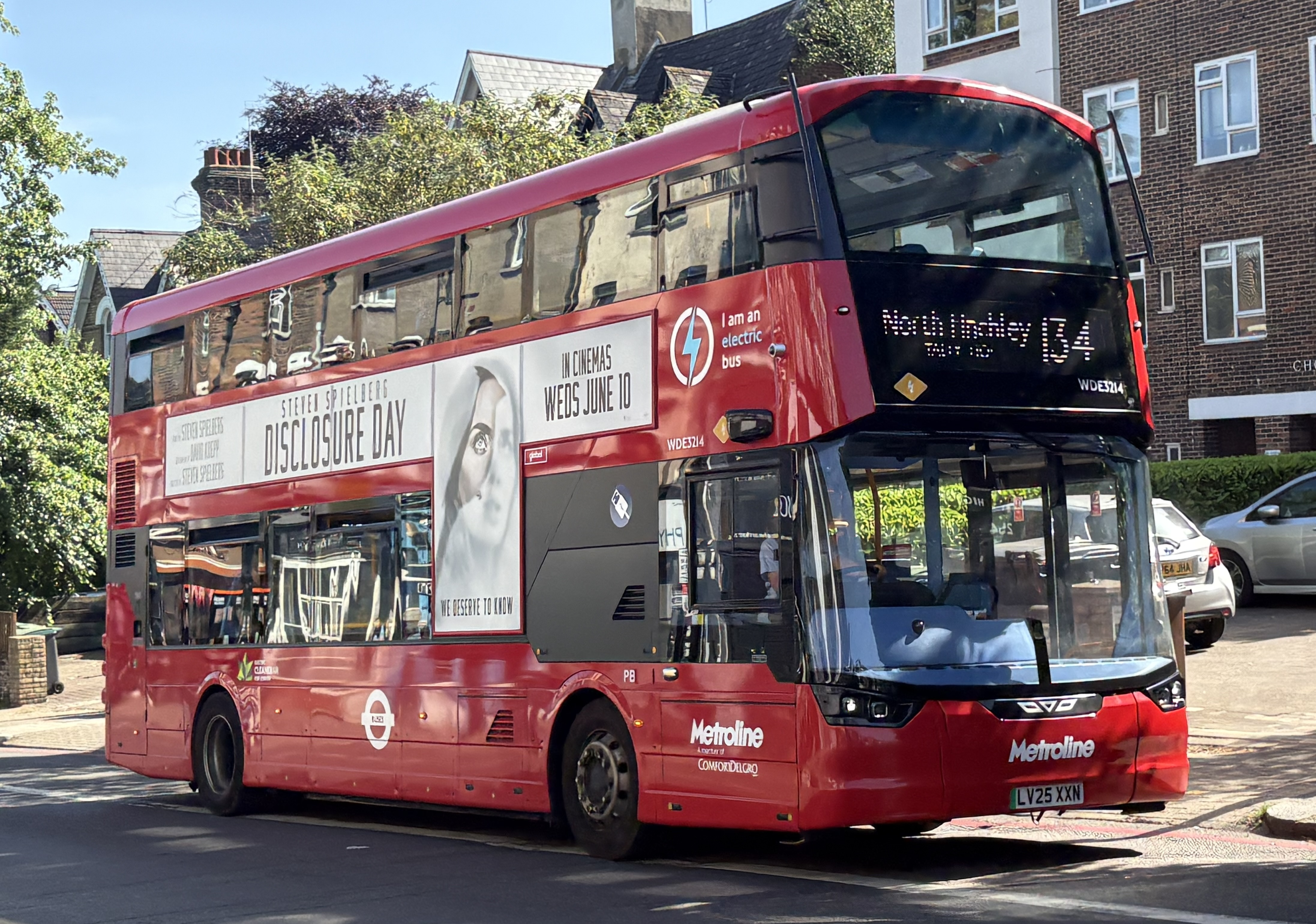
- Metroline Wright StreetDeck Electroliner on Archway Road in May 2026

Overview
- Operator: Metroline
- Garage: Potters Bar
- Vehicle: Wright StreetDeck Electroliner

Route
- Start: North Finchley bus station
- Via: Friern Barnet; Muswell Hill; Highgate; Archway; Camden Town
- End: University College Hospital

London Buses route 134 is a Transport for London contracted bus route in London, England. Running between North Finchley bus station and University College Hospital, it is operated by Metroline.

== History ==
The route previously continued north to Potters Bar, and south past Warren Street station to Victoria bus station. However, following the opening of the Victoria line in 1969 it was cut back to its present terminus at Warren Street. The London Transport Executive stated that the opening of the tube line had reduced the number of passengers travelling between Warren Street and Victoria.

Upon being re-tendered, the route was retained by Metroline with a new contract commencing on 5 February 2005.

On 15 June 2019, the route was shortened; its southern terminus became University College Hospital near Warren Street station, replacing the former southern terminus at Tottenham Court Road station.

In June 2018, it was announced that electric buses would be introduced on this route. On 19 August 2019, new Optare MetroDecker EVs manufactured by Optare were introduced.

=== Contract tendering ===
On 5 March 2005, a 5-year contract was awarded to Metroline with increased frequencies resulting in an allocation of 31 TPL buses on Monday-Friday, 24 TPL buses on Saturdays and 21 TPL buses on Sundays from Holloway garage.

On 4 February 2012, another 5-year contract was awarded to Metroline.

== Current route ==
Route 134 operates via these primary locations:

- North Finchley bus station
- Friern Barnet
- Colney Hatch
- Muswell Hill
- Highgate Wood
- Highgate station
- Archway station
- Tufnell Park station
- Kentish Town station
- Camden Town station
- Mornington Crescent station
- Warren Street station
- University College Hospital
