= Mornington Crescent tube station =

London Underground station

Mornington Crescent
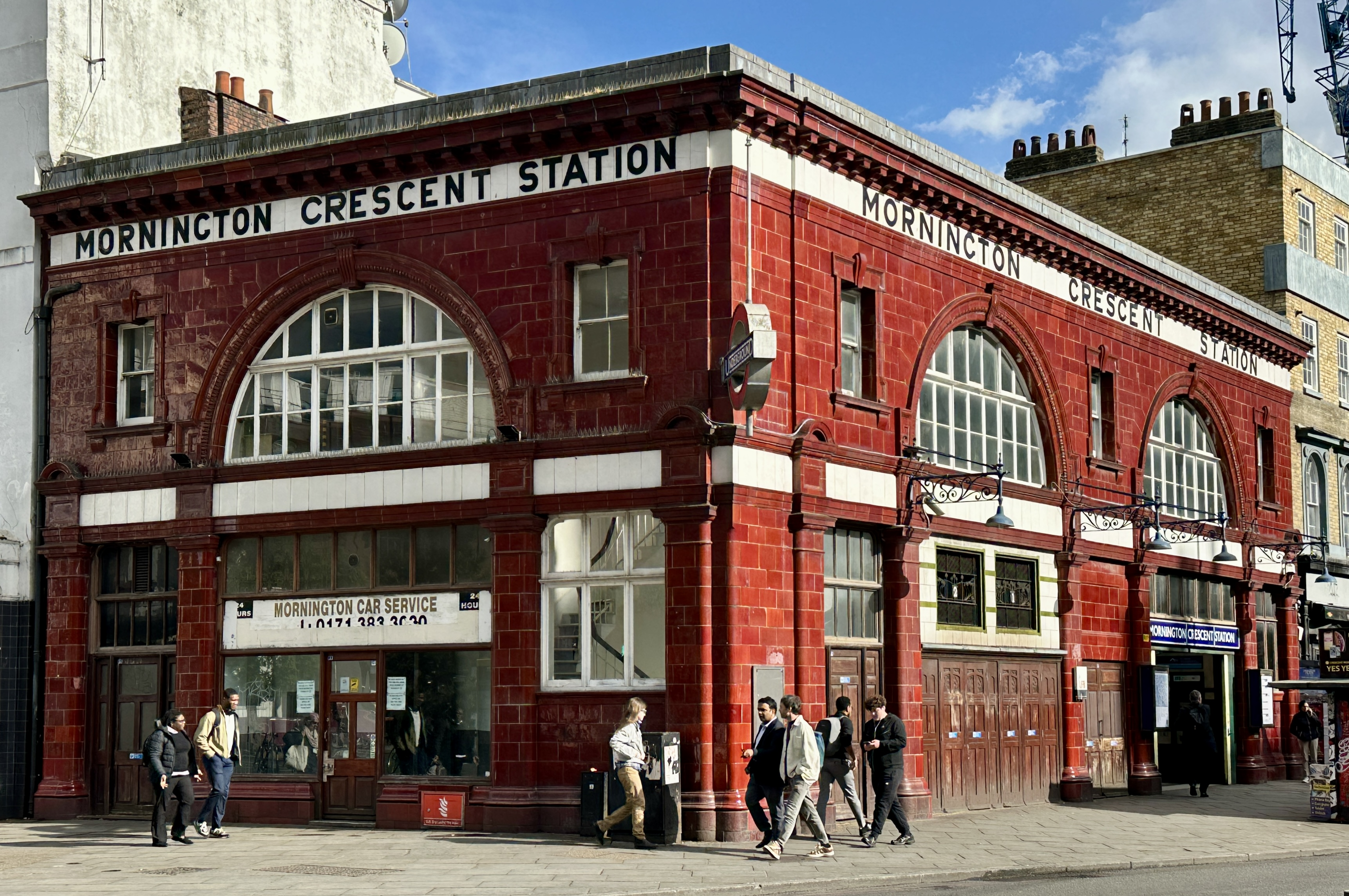
- Station exterior
- Interactive map of Mornington Crescent

General information
- Location: Mornington Crescent
- Local authority: London Borough of Camden
- Managed by: London Underground
- Number of platforms: 2
- Fare zone: 2

London Underground annual entry and exit
- 2021: ▲1.43 million
- 2022: ▲2.67 million
- 2023: ▲2.97 million
- 2024: ▼2.84 million
- 2025: ▼2.74 million

Key dates
- 22 June 1907: Opened (CCE&HR)
- 23 October 1992: Closed for refurbishment
- 27 April 1998: Reopened

Listed status
- Listing grade: II
- Entry number: 1378713
- Added to list: 24 April 1987; 39 years ago

Other information
- External links: TfL station info page
- Coordinates: 51.5344°N 0.1386°W

Mornington Crescent is a London Underground station in Somers Town in north-west London, named after the nearby street. It is on the Charing Cross branch of the Northern line, between Camden Town and Euston stations. It is in London fare zone 2.

The station was opened as part of the original route of the Charing Cross, Euston & Hampstead Railway (now the Charing Cross branch of the Northern line) on 22 June 1907. The surface building was designed by the Underground Electric Railways Company of London's (UERL's) architect Leslie Green in the Modern Style (British Art Nouveau style). Prior to the station's opening, the name of "Seymour Street" had been proposed. After opening, it was little used. For many years it was open only on weekdays, and before 1966 Edgware-bound trains passed through without stopping.

== Location ==
The station is situated at the southern end of Camden High Street, where it meets Hampstead Road and Eversholt Street. This junction forms the north-western corner of the boundary of Somers Town, with Camden Town situated to the north and Regent's Park Estate to the south of the station.

The station's location on the Northern line is unusual due to the dual-branch nature of that line. On the Charing Cross branch, Mornington Crescent is between Camden Town and Euston. The Bank branch also runs from Camden Town to Euston, but via tunnels which take an entirely different route to the Charing Cross branch and which do not pass through Mornington Crescent. Although modern-day tube maps show Mornington Crescent to the west of the Bank branch tunnels, it is actually to the east of them: the two branches cross over each other at Euston, so that between Euston and Camden Town, the Bank branch tunnels run to the west of the Charing Cross branch on which Mornington Crescent is situated. Harry Beck's 1933 tube map represented this correctly.

There is a northwards facing crossover to the north of the station to enable trains from Camden Town to terminate and head back north.

== Closure and reopening ==
On 23 October 1992, the station was shut so that the then 85-year-old lifts could be replaced. The intention was to open it within one year. However, due to lack of funding and the state of neglect, the station remained closed for six years.

A concerted campaign to reopen the station was launched, with pressure from Camden Council, and assistance from the popular BBC Radio 4 panel game I'm Sorry I Haven't a Clue. The show frequently features the game Mornington Crescent, which takes its name from the station.

During the station's rebuilding, the original distinctive light blue tiling pattern was restored to the station (though taking into account modern fire safety requirements). The ticket hall was reconstructed and the original emergency stairs closed. A second lift shaft was converted (losing the unnecessary extra two lifts) into a staircase on one side and a series of station facilities on the other.

After substantial refurbishment, the station was reopened on 27 April 1998 by the regular cast of I'm Sorry I Haven't a Clue (Humphrey Lyttelton, Barry Cryer, Tim Brooke-Taylor and Graeme Garden). A memorial plaque to the late Willie Rushton, one of the longest-serving panelists, was installed at the station in 2002.

Since its 1998 reopening, the station has been open at the same times as most other stations, including weekends, in an attempt to relieve the pressure on the increasingly busy nearby Camden Town station.

== Services ==
Mornington Crescent station is on the Charing Cross branch of the Northern line in London fare zone 2. It is between Camden Town to the north and Euston to the south. The typical offpeak service in trains per hour (tph) is as follows:

- 20 tph Southbound to Kennington, of which 10 continue to Battersea power station
- 10 tph Northbound to Edgware
- 8 tph Northbound to High Barnet
- 2 tph Northbound to Mill Hill East

Preceding station	London Underground	Following station
Camden Town towards Edgware, Mill Hill East or High Barnet	Northern line Charing Cross branch	Euston towards Battersea Power Station, Morden or Kennington

== See also ==
- Mornington Crescent (street), the 1820s terrace after which the tube station is named
