= Kentish Town West railway station =

London Overground station in the London Borough of Camden

Kentish Town West
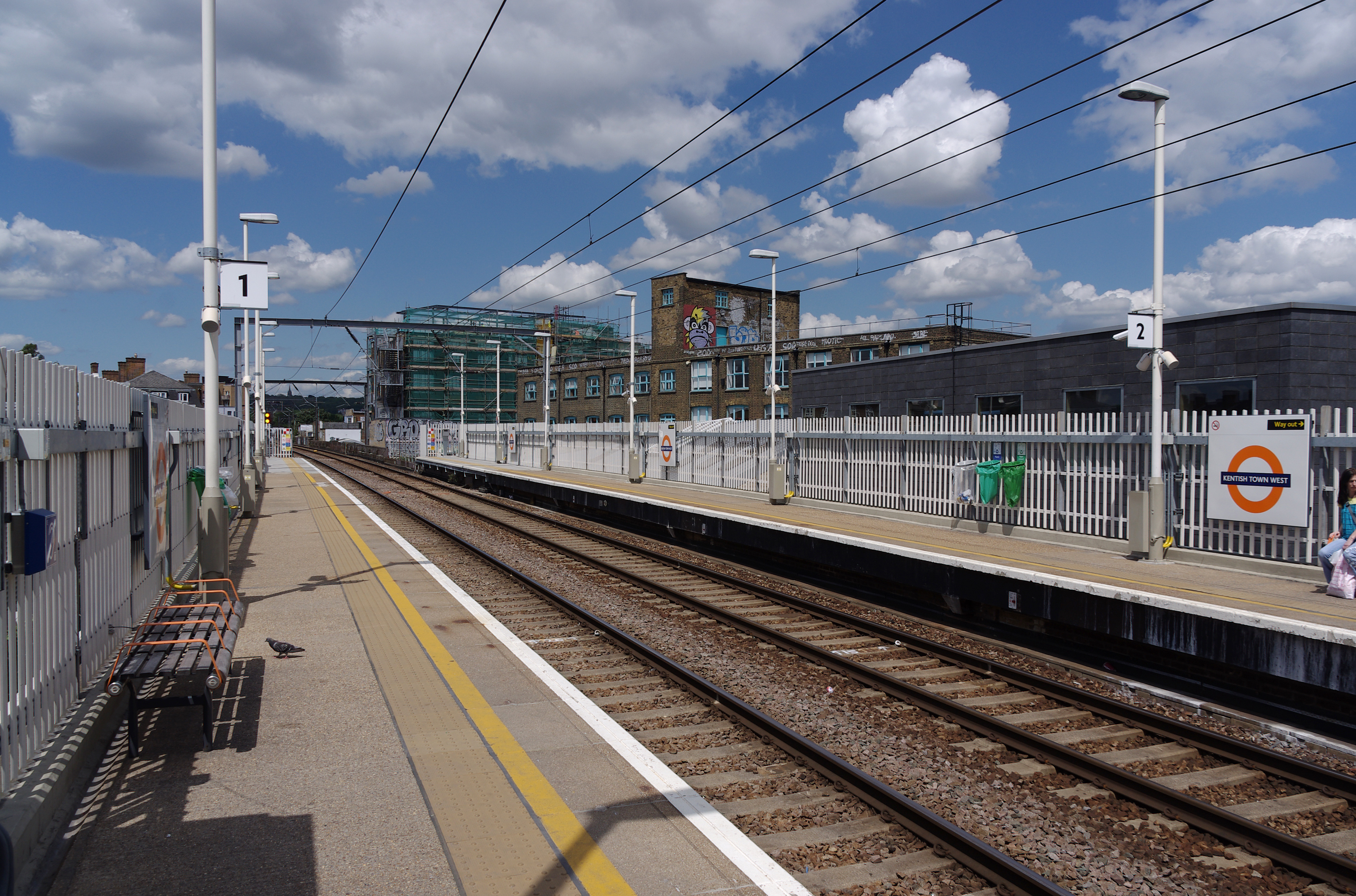
- Interactive map of Kentish Town West

General information
- Location: Kentish Town
- Local authority: London Borough of Camden
- Managed by: London Overground
- Owner: Network Rail
- Station code: KTW
- DfT category: E
- Number of platforms: 2
- Fare zone: 2
- OSI: Kentish Town

National Rail annual entry and exit
- 2020–21: ▼0.702 million
- 2021–22: ▲1.345 million
- 2022–23: ▲1.545 million
- 2023–24: ▲1.887 million
- 2024–25: ▼1.886 million

Key dates
- 1 April 1867: Opened as Kentish Town
- 2 June 1924: Renamed Kentish Town West
- 18 April 1971: Closed due to fire
- 5 October 1981: Reopened

Other information
- External links: Departures; Facilities
- Coordinates: 51.5468°N 0.1468°W

Kentish Town West is a station on the Mildmay line of the London Overground, located on Prince of Wales Road in the London Borough of Camden. It is in London fare zone 2.

== History ==
The station opened on 1 April 1867 as "Kentish Town", was renamed "Kentish Town West" on 2 June 1924, and no trains called after a serious fire on 18 April 1971. In 1976, British Rail began the procedure for its permanent closure. If no objections were received by 19 November 1976, the station would be deemed closed from Monday 20 December 1976. Despite this announcement, the station was rebuilt and re-opened on 5 October 1981. It was officially opened by Ken Livingstone, Leader of the Greater London Council. The £400,000 cost of rebuilding had been financed entirely by the GLC. The new station consisted of a booking hall and ticket office, plus waiting shelters on the platforms.

To allow four-car trains to run on the London Overground network, the North London line between Gospel Oak and Stratford closed in February 2010, and reopened on 1 June 2010, in order to install a new signalling system and to extend 30 platforms. After the reopening the work continued until May 2011 with a reduced service and none on Sundays.

== Services ==
The station is managed by London Overground, which also operates all services from the station. The basic weekday service is eight Mildmay line services per hour in each direction, calling at every station. Four trains are Richmond to Stratford services, alternating with four services between Clapham Junction and Stratford. Services are formed of Class 378 Capitalstar electric multiple units, which replaced the older Class 313 EMUs.

Preceding station	London Overground	Following station
Gospel Oak towards Clapham Junction or Richmond	Mildmay line North London line	Camden Road towards Stratford

== Connections ==
London Buses routes 46 and 393 serve the station.

== See also ==
- Kentish Town station, on the Northern line and Thameslink.
