= List of garden squares in London =

This is a list of garden squares, broadly defined, in London, England. Unlike the list at Squares in London, which partially overlaps, these places all have a clear communal garden element and may be named other than Square; commonly in order, Gardens, Crescent, Place, Fields and Circus reflecting the diversity of the city's complex street layout. Non-square instances are only in this list if strongly, inherently notable for architecture, use or size – a common selectivity in the study of the history and use of such spaces.

The list deliberately avoids many similar public greens, verges and crescents outside of Central London. So too the few large public green places (commons or parks) away from the City which are not shrouded by six-foot (or more) walls even if faced conspicuously by buildings.

Some officially named 'Square' (streets and/or spaces) in London are triangular or a circle (circus). For instance Walcot Square and Wilton Square are triangular, Hanover Square is an oval as to the garden, many are very elongated rectangles such as Bryanston Square — thus the London internal communal garden or park fronted by buildings, is not confined to squares of the main dictionary definition. Truest garden squares meet the recognisable criteria of a shared internal zone, faced chiefly by buildings' fronts having one or more open approach ways, so are not beholden to legal name nor precise shape.

Garden courtyards are commonly omitted from this list, for having been intuitively named 'Gardens' or 'Garden Apartments', or for a communal garden which is not large enough to meet traditional definitions of garden squares and so is unlikely to open for open-day visits.

Several items at Squares in London, a list of places named "... Square", have lost a shared hemmed-in zone with multi-estate neighbouring buildings, removing their square status, and making them town squares, remnants in name only, or private courtyards.

== Barnet ==
- Central Square
- Litchfield Square
- Lucas Square

== Brent ==
- Cambridge Square

== Bromley ==
- Watermen's Square

== Camden ==
- Argyle Square
- Bedford Square
- Bloomsbury Square
- Brunswick Square
- Camden Square
- Coram's Fields
- Chalcot Square
- Euston Square
- Gainsborough Gardens
- Gordon Square
- Gray's Inn Square
- Grove Terrace Squares
- Harrington Square
- Mecklenburgh Square
- Mornington Crescent, London
- Munster Square
- Oakley Square
- Pond Square
- Queen Square, London
- Red Lion Square
- Regent Square
- Russell Square
- South Grove Square
- Tavistock Square
- Torrington Square
- Woburn Square

== City of London ==
- Aldermanbury Square
- Bunhill Fields (within London Borough of Islington)
- Devonshire Square
- Finsbury Circus
- Gough Square
- Monkwell Square
- Paternoster Square
- Salisbury Square
- Warwick Square

== Hackney ==
- Albion Square
- Charles Square, Hackney
- Clapton Square
- De Beauvoir Square
- Fassett Square
- Goldsmith's Square
- London Fields
- Hoxton Square
- St Thomas's Square
- Town Hall Square, Hackney

== Hammersmith & Fulham ==
- Brompton Park
- Brook Green
- Colehill Gardens
- Imperial Square
- Lillie Square
- Queen's Club Gardens
- St Peter's Square, London
- Weaver's Terrace
- Westcroft Square

== Islington ==
- Alwyne Square
- Anderson Square
- Arlington Square
- Arundel Square
- Barnsbury Square
- Bartholomew Square
- Canonbury Square
- Charterhouse Square
- Claremont Square
- Cloudesley Square
- Edward Square
- Finsbury Square
- Gibson Square
- Granville Square
- King Square
- Lloyd Square
- Lonsdale Square
- Milner Square
- Myddelton Square
- Northampton Square
- Percy Square
- Thornhill Square
- Tibberton Square
- Union Square, Islington
- Vernon Square
- Wilmington Square
- Wilton Square

== Kensington and Chelsea ==
- Arundel Gardens
- Ashburn Place
- Barkston Gardens
- Bina Gardens
- Blenheim Crescent
- The Boltons
- Bolton Gardens
- Bramham Gardens
- Cadogan Place
- Cadogan Square
- Cambridge Gardens
- Campden Hill Square
- Collingham Gardens
- Colville Gardens
- Colville Square
- Courtfield Gardens
- Earl's Court Square
- Edwardes Square
- Egerton Gardens
- Elgin Crescent
- Elm Park Gardens
- Ennismore Gardens
- Gledhow Gardens
- Harrington Gardens
- Hans Place
- Hereford Square
- Kensington Gardens Square
- Kensington Square
- Kensington Park Gardens
- Lansdowne Crescent, London
- Lennox Gardens
- Lowndes Square
- Nevern Square
- Markham Square
- Norland Square
- Onslow Square
- Paultons Square
- Pelham Crescent
- Pembridge Square
- Pembroke Square
- Philbeach Gardens
- Princes Gardens, London
- Powis Square
- Queen's Gate Gardens
- Redcliffe Square
- Royal Crescent, London
- Sloane Square
- Stanley Gardens and Stanley Crescent, Holland Park
- Stanhope Gardens
- St James's Gardens
- Tavistock Crescent
- Thurloe Square
- Warwick Square
- Wellington Square
- Wetherby Gardens

== Kingston upon Thames ==
- St Andrew's Square, Kingston upon Thames

== Lambeth ==
- Albert Square, Lambeth
- Bonnington Square
- Cleaver Square
- Courtenay Square
- Denny Crescent
- Grafton Square
- Walcot Square
- St Mary's Gardens
- Becondale Road

== Southwark ==
- Addington Square
- Avondale Square
- Camberwell Green
- Leyton Square
- Merrick Square
- Nelson Square
- Surrey Square Park
- Trinity Church Square
- West Square

== Tower Hamlets ==
- Arbour Square
- Arnold Circus, the Boundary Estate
- Beaumont Square
- Carlton Square
- Ford Square
- Ion Square
- Sidney Square
- Tredegar Square
- Trinity Square, Tower Hamlets
- York Square

== Wandsworth ==
- Nightingale Square
- Park Crescent, London
- St Philip Square

== Westminster ==
- Berkeley Square
- Belgrave Square
- Bryanston Square
- Cavendish Square
- Cambridge Square
- Chester Square
- Craven Hill Gardens (Note: Craven Hill Gardens has two gardens, one being the small main square)
- Dolphin Square
- Dorset Square
- Eaton Square
- Ebury Square
- Eccleston Square
- Gloucester Square
- Golden Square
- Grosvenor Square
- Hanover Square, London
- Hyde Park Square
- Leicester Square
- Lincoln's Inn Fields
- Manchester Square
- Millbank Gardens
- Montagu Square
- Norfolk Square
- Oxford Square
- Park Square, London
- Parliament Square
- Porchester Square
- Portman Square
- Soho Square
- St George's Square
- St James's Square
- Smith Square
- Sussex Square
- Talbot Square
- Trafalgar Square
- Victoria Square, London
- Vincent Square
- Warwick Square
- Wilton Crescent

== See also ==
- London Squares and Enclosures (Preservation) Act 1906 (6 Edw. 7. c. clxxxvii)
- Royal Commission on London Squares
- London Squares Preservation Act 1931 (21 & 22 Geo. 5. c. xciii)
- Roosevelt Memorial Act 1946 (9 & 10 Geo. 6. c. 83)
