= Squares in London =

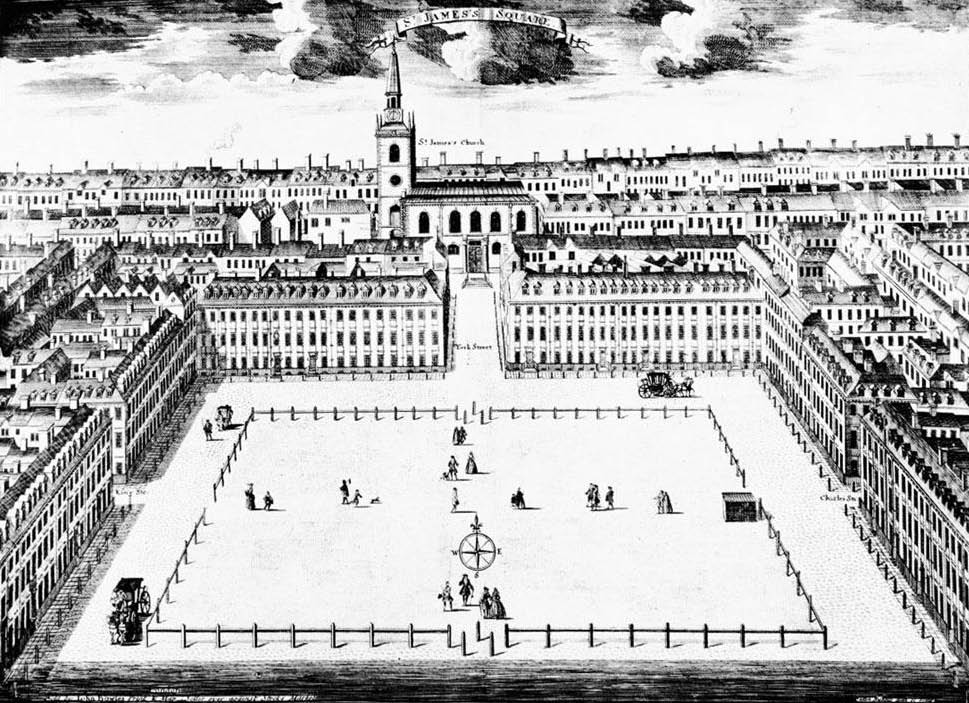
St. James's Square, c. 1722

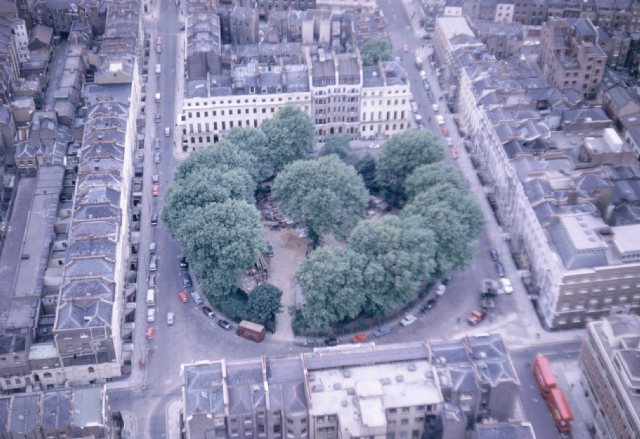
Fitzroy Square

Squares have long been a feature of London and come in numerous identifiable forms. The landscaping spectrum of squares stretches from those with more hardscape, constituting town squares (also known as city squares)—to those with communal gardens, for which London is a major international exponent, known as garden squares. London's largest privately owned square is Vincent Square, in Westminster, which comprises 13 acres.

A few in the capital of the United Kingdom, such as Trafalgar Square, began as public open spaces in the same way as other city squares worldwide, typically a plaza, piazza and a platz in Spain, Italy and Germany. Most, however, began as garden squares i.e. private communal gardens for the inhabitants of surrounding houses. All types of the space are more prevalent in parts of London with high (urban) density. Some of these gardens are now open to the public, while others, for example around Notting Hill, are railed (a form of fencing) and private.

The terminology has been loosely applied for over a century. Some "squares" are irregularly shaped—including five triangles, a pentagon, hexagon, octagon, and two ovals among those officially named Square. Approbative and technical studies of garden squares commonly cover equivalent landscaped communal gardens not named as a Square many of which have become small public parks. A diversity of descriptive names features in the list of London's "garden squares".

== Name and shape ==
"Square" is a generic term for neat, planned or set aside urban open spaces larger than a verge or pavement overlooked by buildings. In London, elements of fields were set aside, a fact reflected in the name of the square London Fields and two later examples: Coram's Fields and Lincoln's Inn Fields. Some are not actually square, or even rectangular. One reason for this is the use of a local nickname for the street, park or garden in question. Another is that some older squares were irregularly shaped to begin with, or lost their original layout due to the city's many transformations, not least following the Great Fire of London and The Blitz.

The street naming (or streetnaming) authority of each London Borough and the City of London Corporation, by authority of an act of Parliament, the London Building Acts (Amendment) Act 1939 (2 & 3 Geo. 6. c. xcvii), imposes rules to authorise appropriate street names for new developments and for owners wishing to rename features. Commercial building and retained historic names apart, new residential squares must in many boroughs be "for a square only" — considered not well elongated but rectangular and to some extent open. Billiter Square, EC3 and Millennium Square, SE1 in districts dominated by retail, commerce and offices are among many modern buildings (not beside a visible rectangular open space) that include alternative, higher built density, square features to their design—such as a courtyard or a square footprint.

Some squares such as Granary Square are paved; others like Russell Square have grass and trees; many others have diverse communal gardens. Most of those that are actually square have the word in their name, and these are listed below. Others more flexibly identified do not. Such notable lists are commonly identified as list of garden squares or estate gardens, communal gardens, formal gardens, about which many books have been written. Increasingly, spaces are being constructed that are legally private, though in practice open to the public (Paternoster Square).

The Royal Borough of Kensington and Chelsea contains over a hundred garden squares whose use is restricted to residents, almost all share a name with their directly adjoining road. Residents may contract with private contractors or with the council, in which case the council charges those residents, typically at the same time as council tax. One instance is a lens (pointed oval), The Boltons.

Toward the public end of the public/private continuum, London's growth has taken in village greens. A minority of these partly or wholly survive such as Newington Green to form council-run open spaces breaking up housing, road networks and/or retail streets. The categories of greens and garden squares become more well-visited where larger than an informal scale. These are mainly government-run, characteristic parks and open spaces in London. By subtle distinction their less urban equivalent amounts to London's 26 commons most of which were diminished in the period of legal inclosure and/or the city/county's 16 country parks.

== History ==
=== Development of squares ===
The making of residential squares fell into decline in the early 20th century, one of the last notable such squares having been designed by Edwin Lutyens for Hampstead Garden Suburb. Numerous squares were in danger of filling in for further building. This was banned by the London Squares Preservation Act 1931 (21 & 22 Geo. 5. c. xciii). In the last quarter of the 20th century a fashion for making office squares developed, a trend led by the Broadgate development. Developers such as London Square, Berkeley Homes and Taylor Wimpey (in the first two instances through their London subsidiaries) have built and set aside land in more than one of their 21st century London developments to create those of the residential type. More broadly, mixed-use squares to give a focal area have become a resurgent planning design, reflected for instance in Times Square, Sutton and Canada Square, Canary Wharf.

=== Viewings and events in private communal gardens ===
Since 1998 many private squares (which term in that context takes in many other shapes of gardens between houses) temporarily open to the paying public: London's "Open Garden Squares Weekend", founded by Caroline Aldiss, takes place on the second weekend in June. The event is organised by London Parks and Gardens. In 2013 over 200 gardens took part, including the garden of the prime minister at 10 Downing Street and the Gardens of HM Prison Wormwood Scrubs. Other events in keynote squares coincide such as a World Archaeology Festival, Gordon Square, Bloomsbury run by UCL Institute of Archaeology.

The parks can be categorised as public garden squares, private garden squares or other squares.

=== Social importance ===
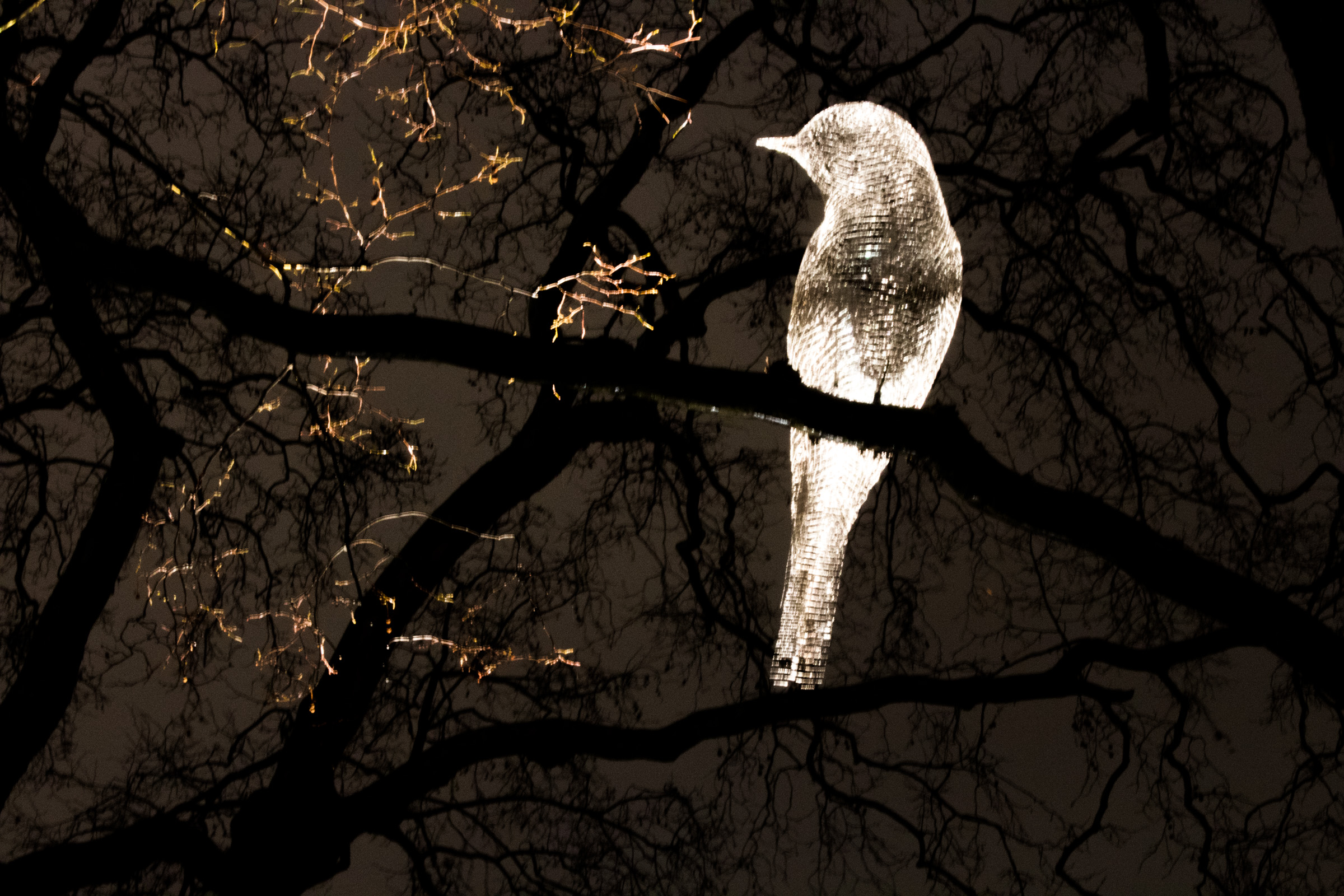
An illuminated wire sculpture of a nightingale, displayed in London's Berkeley Square as part of Lumiere London 2018, an art festival. The sculpture and the accompanying soundtrack A Nightingale Sang in Berkeley Square formed an art installation titled 'Was that a dream?' by a French artist Cédric Le Borgne.

The local proliferation relative to other UK cities coupled with, since the early 20th century, their widespread opening up has similarly made squares broadly cited in portrayals of London. Initially cultural use was mainly confined to novels and, to a lesser degree, fine art.

"It's a Long Way to Tipperary" is a 1910s song featuring the line "Farewell Leicester Square". "A Nightingale Sang in Berkeley Square" is a romantic hit of 1940 with lyrics by Eric Maschwitz and music by Manning Sherwin, sang that year separately by Ray Noble and Vera Lynn and a theme of a film the next year, by Fritz Lang., Man Hunt. In the 1956 song "Why Can't The English?" from the musical My Fair Lady, Professor Henry Higgins laments, "Hear them down in Soho Square/Dropping H's everywhere."

Drama most notably includes the high-audience soap opera broadcast by the BBC running since 1985, EastEnders based on a semi-permanent set north of London's border, Albert Square. It had pre-release titles Square Dance, Round the Square, Round the Houses, London Pride and East 8.

Soho Square garden contains a bench that commemorates the singer Kirsty MacColl, who wrote the song "Soho Square" for her album Titanic Days. After her death in 2000, fans bought a memorial bench in her honour, inscribing the lyrics: "One day I'll be waiting there / No empty bench in Soho Square". The Lindisfarne album Elvis Lives On the Moon also includes a song named after that square.

== Notable communal gardens surrounded by buildings ==
- Arundel Gardens
- Bedford Square
- Belgrave Square
- Berkeley Square
- Clapton Square
- Egerton Gardens
- Finsbury Circus
- Golden Square
- Grosvenor Square
- Hans Place
- Harrington Gardens
- Kensington Square
- Kensington Park Gardens
- Lennox Gardens, London
- Park Crescent
- Royal Crescent
- Russell Square
- St George's Square
- St. James's Square
- Sloane Square
- Soho Square
- The Boltons
- Wilton Crescent

== Most notable town squares ==
- Trafalgar Square
- Leicester Square
- Parliament Square

== List of Greater London squares ==
This list comprises places bearing the word Square. The tables state if each has an open-air space exceeding a double-size pavement or the provision of parking spaces. Those marked mainly (due to a building, typically a church, school or community hall in the space) or yes have a clear, open space. Those marked No include streets of any shape including those with vestigial names (throwbacks) to open spaces that lay there (or adjacent) before.

Demolished squares are listed in a table at the end of this section.

Approximate area, in square metres, includes hardscapes and roads.

London's squares are arranged by postcode, see the map below of postcodes.

London post town postcodes

=== Centremost postcodes ===
Name	Post district	Open-to-sky area between buildings	Image	m^{2}
King	EC1	Mainly		16000
Charterhouse	EC1	Yes	(Note: A pentagon. One actual square is directly north and commonly confused by map makers, the Green. Nine smaller courtyards exist, e.g., Preacher's Court, Pensioners Court, Masters Court: mostly green.)	9300
Northampton	EC1	Yes		6600
Brewery	EC1	Yes		900
Waterhouse	EC1	Yes	(Note: Within subdivision of a building (into three), a courtyard, linked by public ways to all but north side. Takes up site of Furnival's Inn.)	1500
Coldbath (historically Cold Bath)	EC1	Yes		320
St John's	EC1	Yes		4500 (Note: historic hardscapes north and south of Clerkenwell Road)
Myddelton	EC1	Yes		14000
Rosebery	EC1	No	(Note: a C-shaped building with a raised terrace occupying the void)	600
Bartholomew	EC1	No	(Note: Bartholomew Court of the Redbrick Estate could be said to comprise it yet its north side remains: three buildings, today numbered №s 20-28.)	0
Finsbury	EC2	Mainly		17000
Devonshire	EC2	Yes		3200 (Note: including avenue/plaza East approach in the m^{2} shown.)
Reliance	EC2	No		0
Mark	EC2	Yes	(Note: Taken as Mark Street Gardens, fronting south-west of this short street)	2400
Finsbury Avenue	EC2	Mainly		2600
Aldermanbury	EC2	Yes		1650
Exchange	EC2	Yes		5900
Monkwell	EC2	Yes		2280
Bridgewater	EC2	No	A small pre-school playground	500
New Inn	EC2	No		0
Trinity	EC3	Yes		8200
St Helen's	EC3	Yes		2700 (Note: North-west mini-extension omitted)
America	EC3	Yes		1000
Paternoster	EC4	Yes		3200
Salisbury	EC4	Yes		1280
New Street	EC4	Yes		1350
Warwick	EC4	Yes		1150 (Note: A tree on a verge then a side yard with a surface car park in the City of London)
Gough	EC4	Yes		480
Ludgate	EC4	No		0
Queen	WC1	Yes		8660
Red Lion	WC1	Mainly		7200
Gray's Inn	WC1	Yes		4430
South	WC1	Yes		2600
Bloomsbury	WC1	Yes		12000
Regent	WC1	Yes		7500
Mecklenburgh	WC1	Mainly	(Note: Forms the east of Coram’s Fields)	18000
Granville	WC1	Yes		5000
Wilmington	WC1	Yes		7200
Lloyd	WC1	Yes		4900
Fleet	WC1	Yes	(Note: Car park with a much smaller zone of trees, lawn or shrubs) (Note: Smaller than the large communal courtyard(s) in the same estate)	1850
Wells	WC1	Mainly		1400
Argyle	WC1	Yes		7800
Brunswick	WC1	Yes	(Note: Forms the west of Coram’s Fields)	18000
Torrington	WC1	Mainly		8800
Tavistock	WC1	Yes		18000
Gordon	WC1	Yes		16000 (Note: Excludes SE greens with table zone used by UCL)
Woburn	WC1	Yes		6200
Russell	WC1	Yes		40000
Bedford	WC1	Yes		17000
New	WC2	Yes	(Note: Part of Lincoln's Inn. One side is open (to Lincoln's Inn Fields))	7000

=== Inner ===
==== North and northwest ====
Name	Post district	Open-to-sky area between buildings	Image	m^{2}
Canonbury	N1	Yes		8500
Union	N1	Yes		5700
Arlington	N1	Yes		9200
Claremont	N1	Yes		12000
King's Cross Square	N1	Yes		6900
Hoxton	N1	Yes		6000
Lewis Cubitt Square	N1	Yes		5200
Charles	N1	Yes		2700
Highbury	N5	Yes		9900
Cloudesley	N1	Mainly		4800
John Spencer	N1	Yes		5200 (Note: Set around two greens)
De Beauvoir	N1	Yes		12000
Old Royal Free	N1	Yes		2800
Lonsdale	N1	Yes		5250
Gibson	N1	Yes		8200
Milner	N1	Yes		4900
Barnsbury	N1	Yes		7750
Edward	N1	Yes		5900
Alwyne	N1	Yes		3600
Wellington	N1	Yes		3750
Anderson	N1	Yes		1400
Peabody	N1	Yes		1350
Packington	N1	Yes		2500
Canalside	N1	Yes		3800
Red House	N1	Yes		3000
Wilton	N1	Yes		4200 (Note: The outer sides form four lines, one very short; the inner sides i.e. the communal gardens are a rounded triangle)
Thornhill	N1	Mainly	(Note: An oval.)	20000
Pond	N6	Mainly		6400
Park	NW1	Yes		28000
Euston	NW1	Yes		7000
Munster	NW1	Yes		4400
Dorset	NW1	Yes		8500
Blandford	NW1	Yes		1500 each (Note: Green, landscaped zones south of four parallel housing blocks; replaced original square and four small streets)
Chalcot	NW1	Yes		3600
Tolmers	NW1	Yes		2000 (Note: An irregular octagon, with housing facing on seven sides, opened by road eighth side and mini-roundabout; extra courtyards and gated.)
Oakley	NW1	Yes		13000 (Note: As from Victorian layout, an elongated semi-hexagon, with large green)
Harrington	NW1	Yes		8000 (Note: A triangle with arterial road)
Ampthill	NW1	Yes		5000 (Note: And extra zones of green and playgrounds)
Elliott	NW1	No		0
St Mark's	NW1	Mainly		3000
Alma	NW8	Yes		2800
Camden	NW1	Yes		16000
Northpoint and Caledonian	NW1	No		0 (Note: Recesses in a building’s front (car parks in indents) are marked no for ease of reference.)
Triton	NW1	No		0
Rochester	NW1	No		0
Islington	N1	No		0
1 Hamond	N1	No		0 (Note: Block of flats with smaller garden to rear)
Hoffman	N1	No		0
Uhura	N16	No		0

==== West and southwest ====
Name	Post district	Open-to-sky area between buildings	Image	m^{2}
Eaton	SW1	Yes		51000
Vincent	SW1	Yes		47000
Belgrave	SW1	Yes		36000
Grosvenor	W1	Yes		30000
St George's	SW1	Mainly		22000
Berkeley	W1	Yes		20000
Portman	W1	Yes		20000
Eccleston	SW1	Yes		18000
Onslow	SW7	Yes		17000
Warwick	SW1	Yes		15000
Cavendish	W1	Yes		14500
Parliament	SW1	Yes		14000
Bryanston	W1	Yes		14000
Redcliffe	SW10	Mainly		13500
Dolphin	SW1	Mainly		12000 (Note: More than 1000 flats occupy the Houses of Dolphin Square, the building sitting in the square is its Sports Centre with café/restaurant. Beatty House, Collingwood House, Drake House, Duncan House, Frobisher House, Grenville House and Hawkins House, Hood House, Howard House, Keyes House, Nelson House, Raleigh House, Rodney House)
Thurloe	SW7	Yes		12000
Montagu	W1	Yes		11000
Lowndes	SW1	Yes		11000
Cleveland	W2	Yes		10000
Kensington Gardens	W8	Mainly		10000
Kensington	W8	Yes		8400
Smith	SW1	Mainly		5900 (Note: Half of Smith Square is a church if excluding the circular road with five exits surrounding)
Fitzroy	W1	Yes		8700
Nevern	SW5	Yes		8700
Manchester	W1	Yes		8000
Hereford	SW7	Yes		7400
Chelsea	SW3	Yes		10000
Carlyle	SW3	Yes		8200
Tedworth	SW3	Yes		4800
Cadogan	SW1	Yes		13000
Edwardes	W8	Yes		16000
Norland	W11	Yes		12000
Pembridge	W2	Yes		10000
Sloane	SW1	Yes		6000
Duke of York	SW3	Mainly		5000 (Note: Retail estate, north of, and café-centrepiece town square)
Paultons	SW3	Yes		6500
Earl's Court	SW5	Yes		6400
Ebury	SW1	Yes		6000
Brompton	SW3	Yes		6200 (Note: A long lune shape)
Markham	SW3	Yes		4500
Montpelier	SW7	Yes		4300
Alexander	SW3	Yes		4200 (Note: Alexander Square is on one side trees to the back of houses on Egerton Crescent (the only square is conceived taking in Brompton Road), has three minor roads around the other sides of its thin strip of green divided in two by another minor road)
Ovington	SW3	Yes		2600
Trevor	SW7	Yes		2800
Lindsay	SW1	Mainly		2000
Victoria	SW1	Yes		1250
Pearson	W1	Mainly		1600
Wellington	SW3	Yes		1500
Admiral	SW10	Yes		1080
Coleridge	SW10	Yes		1040
St Mary's	W2	Yes		1250
Gloucester	W2	Yes		8200
Hyde Park	W2	Yes		8000
Sussex	W2	Yes		7750
Connaught	W2	Yes		6800
Norfolk	W2	Yes		6400
Sheldon	W2	Mainly		6000
Cambridge	W2	Yes		4200
Oxford	W2	Yes		4200
Talbot	W2	Yes		3000
Lancer	W8	Yes		3550
Rose	SW3	Yes		1200 (Note: Most of the gardens are to the side at Rose Square, a former hospital, Fulham Road, Chelsea, London)
Chantry	W8	Yes		1200 (Note: Chantry Square is set around a small circle with a semi-circular hedge, and is part of Kensington Green, a private gated-community)
St Andrews	W11	Yes		1000
Wesley	W11	Yes		2200
Colville	W11	Mainly		3300
Porchester	W2	Yes		5780
Powis	W11	Yes		4400
Orme	W11	Yes		1980
Prince's	W2	Yes		7200
Leinster	W2	Yes		7200
Katherine	W11	Yes		950
Campden Hill	W8	Yes		8500
Wycombe	W8	Yes		2000
Ravenscourt	W6	Yes		3200
St Peter's Square	W6	Yes		13000
Ashcroft	W6	Yes		4800 (Note: Shopping centre)
Westcroft	W6	Yes		3200
Lyric	W6	Yes		2000
Audley, South Audley Street	W1	Yes		500
Chesterton	W8	Yes		2050 (Note: Chesterton Square is a large courtyard of a large civic/social housing building)
Grafton	SW4	Yes		7500
Battersea	SW11	Yes		1150
Rathbone	W1	Yes		800 (Note: A courtyard)
Shuters (Sun Road)	W14	Yes		800
Vine	W14	Yes		800
Orchard	W14	Yes		600
Ivory	SW11	Yes		500
Nottingdale	W11	Yes		450
Macaulay	SW4	Yes		1500
Imperial	SW6	Yes		2700
Hurlingham	SW6	Yes		2620
Marryat	SW6	Yes		950
Queen's Elm	SW3	Yes		900
Lampeter	W6	No	(Note: South part has a courtyard used for parking and small shrubbery)	400
Restoration	SW11	No		510
White's	SW4	No		0
Philpot	SW6	No		0
Mortimer	W11	No		0
St Charles	W10	No		0
Franklin	W14	No		0
Fountain	SW1	No		0
Brassey	SW11	No		0
Cavalry	SW3	No		0

==== South ====
Name	Postal district	Open to air communal space	Image	m^{2}
Surrey	SE1	Yes		18000
Dickens	SE1	Mainly		12000
Avondale	SE1	Mainly		10000
Trinity Church	SE1	Mainly		7700 (Note: Half of Trinity Church Square is Henry Wood Hall, an Arts Organisation that replaced the church.)
Lorrimore	SE17	Mainly		7400
Nightingale	SW12	Yes		7000
Sutherland	SE17	Not mainly		7000
Albert	SW8	Yes		6500
West	SE11	Yes		6400
Thorburn	SE1	Mainly		6000
Nelson	SE1	Yes		6000
Peckham	SE15	Mainly		5000
Cleaver	SE11	Yes		4800
Peabody	SE1	Yes		4500
Addington	SE5	Yes		4200
St. Philip	Battersea, SW8	Not mainly		4000 (Note: Half of St Philip Square is the Church of St Philip with St Bartholomew.)
Providence	SE1	Yes		4000
Merrick	SE1	Yes		3600
Montague	SE15	Yes		3200
Walcot	SE11	Yes		2700 (Note: Triangular)
St Mary's	SE11	Yes		2700
Perkins	SE1	Yes		2600
Bermondsey	SE16	Yes		2500
Gatehouse	SE1	Yes		2100
Helsinki	SE16	Yes		2000
Millennium, Shad Thames	SE1	Yes		1700
Greenacre	SE16	Yes		1600
Reveley	SE16	Yes		420
Brewery	SE1	Yes		660
Edward	SE16	Yes		900
Elizabeth	SE16	Yes		640
Frederick	SE16	Yes		640
Helena	SE16	Yes		640
Sophia	SE16	Yes		640
William	SE16	Yes		640
New Place	SE16	Yes		3800
Lockwood	SE16	Yes		4800
Marden	SE16	Yes		5100
Layard	SE16	Yes		6000
St Olavs or St Olav's	SE16	Yes		2000
Great Guildford Business	SE1	Not mainly		200
Oslo	SE16	Yes		2300
Bergen	SE16	Yes		1950
Tillett	SE16	Yes		200
Graphite, Vauxhall Walk	SE11	Yes		500
Cornwall, Kennings Way	SW11	Yes		2800 (Note: Cornwall Square is divided by fences among the owners.)
John Parker	SW11	Yes		1000
Fenner	SW11	Yes		1000
Holliday	SW11	Yes		1000
Weekley	SW11	Yes		1000
Winchester	SE1	Mainly		730
Cobalt	Vauxhall, SW8	Yes		1500
St Georges or Saint George's	SE8	Yes		3000 (Note: Bounded by the Thames, a boat repair marina and the roads named Deptford Wharf and Plough Way, St George’s Square in SE8 has no homes or businesses.)
Granville	SE15	Yes		800
Yarnfield	SE15	Yes		2200
Vivian	SE15	Yes		1000
Galatea	SE15	Yes		2500
Huguenot	SE15	Yes		1400
Bonnington	SW8	Yes		900
Hamilton	SE1	Yes		550
Fountain Green	SE16	Yes		970
Rust	SE5	No		0
Shard's	SE15	No		0 (Note: A narrow asphalted accessway)
Choumert	SE15	No		0
Flat Iron	SE1	No		0
Gagarin, Southwark Street	SE1	No		0
Queen Annes	SE1	No		0
Westminster Business	SE11	No		0 (Note: A cross- or t-shaped road, without such space or with apartments that have courtyard(s); mainly a parking lot or accessway.)

==== East ====
Name	Post district	Open to air communal space	Image	m^{2}
Clapton	E5	Yes		12000
Canada	E14	Yes		12000
Ion	E2	Yes		9000
Carlton	E1	Yes		9000
Tredegar (/trɪˈdiːɡər/, Welsh: [trɛˈdeːɡar])	E3	Yes		8900
Beaumont	E1	Yes		8500
Cabot	E14	Yes		8200
Royal Victoria	E16	Yes		5500
St David's	E14	Yes	(Note: Has three squares opening out onto the Thames)	5500
Harpley	E1	Yes		5000
Bishops, Old Spitalfields Market	E1	Yes		5500
Thomas More	E1	Mainly		4500
Ford	E1	Yes		4000
Sidney	E1	Yes		3950
Avis	E1	Yes		3000
Petticoat	E1	Mainly		3800
Rectory	E1	Yes		2800
The Mother's	E5	Yes		2500
Wellclose	E1	Not mainly		800
Hooper	E1	Yes		1600
Hornbeam	E3	Yes		1070
Jasmine	E3	Yes		1070
Grayling	E2	Yes		900
Times	E1	Yes		900 (Note: Mainly water)
Lea	E3	Yes		800
Bartholomew, Cudworth Street	E1	Yes		700
Arbour	Stepney, E1	Yes		6300
Brayford	E1	Yes		1100 (Note: T shaped, pedestrian hardscape)
O’Leary	E1	Yes		1700
Douthwaite	E1	Yes		840
Cork	E1	Yes		500
The Watergarden, Roy	E14	Yes		1100 (Note: A directly enclosed-by-homes, green courtyard)
York	E14	Yes		2800
Cutlers	E14	Yes		895
Vulcan	E14	Yes		900
Torres	E14	Yes		300
Bering	E14	Yes		300
Shalbourne	E9	Yes		1200
Silk Mills	E9	Yes		1200
Leabank	E9	Yes		2500
Alphabet	E3	Yes		2000
Gerry Raffles and Theatre	E15	Yes		2500
Heylyn	E3	Yes		2300
Sheffield	E3	Yes		1700
Guerin	E3	Yes		1600
Trellis	E3	Yes		1500
Stonechat	E6	Yes		1200
Partridge	E6	Yes		1200
Lampern	E2	Yes		1300
Old Market	E2	Yes		1000
Ambassador	E14	Yes		1100 (Note: A tree set in complex-footprint hardstanding)
St George's or Saint George's Square	E14	Yes		700
Aqua Vista	E3	Yes		900
Lanark	E14	Yes		1800
Burrells Wharf	E14	Yes		2500
Capstan	E14	Yes		2000
Botanic	E14	Yes	(Note: Octagon: three sides unfilled)	6000
Hopewell	E14	Yes		2400
Carter	E14	Yes		1000
St Thomas's	E9	Yes		6000
St Peter's	E2	Yes		2000
Pollard	E2	Yes		6400
Market, Chrisp Street	E14	Yes		3000
Fassett	E9	Yes		2200
Shaw	E17	Yes		1275
Sutton (or Urswick Road)	E9	Yes		2400
The Square, High Road/York Road	E10	Yes		2000
Patriot	E2	No		0
Spital	E1	No		0 (Note: A short street, leading past Bishops Square, becoming Lamb Street)
Cumberland Mills	E14	No		0
Murray	E16	No		0
St George's	E7	No		0
Regent	E3	No		0
Old School	E14	No		0
Athol	E14	No		0
Torrens	E15	No		0
Olympus	E5	No		0
Transom	E14	No		0
Forge	E14	No		0
Warrior	E12	No		0
St Luke's	E16	No		0
Goldsmith's	E2	No		0
Education	E1	No		0
Portland	E1	No		1180
Martineau	E1	No		0 (Note: Part of a road with a slight kink)
Chant	E15	No		0
Barnby	E15	No		0
Primrose	E9	No		0
Principal, Chelmer Road	E9	No		0
Albert	E15	No		0
Maryland	E15	No		0
Tollgate	E6	No		0
Goose	E6	No		0
Butterfield	E6	No		0

Renamed squares note:

- Albert Gardens
- Trafalgar Gardens

These two 19th-century-built squares are officially renamed as shown. This avoids confusion with other squares in London.

=== Outer ===
==== East ====
Name	Post town	Post district	Open to air communal space	Image	m^{2}
Eastbury	Barking	IG11	Mainly		9000
Brandesbury	Woodford Green	IG8	Yes		3000
Rosebury	Woodford Green	IG8	Yes		3000
Brackley	Woodford Green	IG6	Yes		1500 (Note: Mostly fenced separate homes and gardens; has a railed verge, with shrubbery, of size stated)
Warrington	Dagenham	RM8	Yes		2700
The Square	Ilford	IG1	Yes		1850
Noel	Dagenham	RM8	Yes		1400 (Note: Three triangles (a tree- and shrub-planted verge crossed by two roads and bounded by another))
Causton	Dagenham	RM9	Yes		2300
Arnett	London	E4	Yes		2700
Manor	Dagenham	RM8	No		0
Osborne	Dagenham	RM9	No		0
Hunters	Dagenham	RM9	No		0
The Square	Woodford Green	IG8	No		0

==== West ====
(the London Boroughs of Hillingdon, Hounslow and Ealing, exc. Harefield, Isleworth and Feltham)

Name	Post town	Post district	Open to air communal space	Image	m^{2}
The Square	Hayes, Uxbridge	UB11	Yes		11000
Sutton	Heston, Hounslow	TW5	Yes		7100
Townfield	Hayes	UB3	Yes		6500
Emerald	Southall	UB2	Yes		4700
Halliday	Southall	UB2	Yes		1800
Cubitt	Southall	UB2	Yes		1400
Coleridge	London	W13	Yes		1200
Victoria	London	W5	Yes		820
St Mary's or Old Ealing	London	W5	Yes		800
Chiswick	London	W4	No		0
Essex Place (Market) (Note: Sometimes considered part of Chiswick High Road)	London	W4	Yes		860
Dolphin	London	W4	No		0
Epsom	Hounslow	TW6	No		0
Cardington	Hounslow	TW4	No		0
Drenon	Hayes	UB3	No		0
Tudor	Hayes	UB3	No		0
Mission	Brentford	TW8	No		0
Ferry	Brentford	TW8	No		0

==== South West ====
Royal/London Boroughs of Kingston upon Thames, Richmond upon Thames and Wandsworth, excluding Battersea, Norwood, Clapham and Balham.

Name	Post town	Post district	Open to air communal space	Image	m^{2}
New	Bedfont, Feltham	TW14	Yes		20000
St. Andrew's	Surbiton	KT6	Yes		8900
Toland	London	SW15	Yes		6000
Aubyn	London	SW15	Yes		3200
Chapman	London	SW19	Yes		3000
Barringer	London	SW17	Yes		1900
Heathfield	London	SW18	Mainly not		13000
Red Lion	London	SW18	No		0
Hardwicks	London	SW18	No		0
St Edmunds (or Saint Edmunds)	London	SW13	Yes		1800
Emerald	London	SW15	Yes		1900
Radcliffe	London	SW15	Yes		1600
Gillis	London	SW15	Yes		1300
Vanneck	London	SW15	Yes		1250
Bevin	London	SW17	Yes		1200
Chartfield	London	SW15	Yes		900
New Chapel	Feltham	TW13	Yes		1400
Topiary	Richmond	TW9	Yes		1400
Heron	Richmond	TW9	Yes		860
Charlotte (Pyland Road)	Richmond	TW10	Yes		1300
Memorial	Kingston upon Thames	KT1	Yes		1600
Sigrist	Kingston upon Thames	KT1	Yes		600
Noel	Teddington	TW11	Yes		500
Lower	Isleworth	TW7	Yes		730
Upper	Isleworth	TW7	Yes		210
Cheriton	London	SW17	No		0
Memorial	Isleworth	TW7	No		0
Belvedere	London	SW19	No		0
George	London	SW19	No		0
Magna	London	SW14	No		0
Pavilion	London	SW17	No		0
The Square	Richmond	TW9	No		0
King George	Richmond	TW10	No		0
Fleetwood	Kingston upon Thames	KT1	No		0
Charter	Kingston upon Thames	KT1	No		0
Ernest	Kingston upon Thames	KT1	No		0
Rosebery	Kingston upon Thames	KT1	No		0
Waters	Kingston upon Thames	KT1	No		0
Ashcombe	New Malden	KT3	No		0
Idmiston	New Malden	KT3	No		0
St George's	New Malden	KT3	No		0
St Leonards	Surbiton	KT6	No		0

==== South East ====
Royal/London Boroughs of Greenwich, Lewisham, Bexley and Bromley (plus Norwood and Dulwich)

Name	Post town	Post district	Open to air communal space	Image	m^{2}
Ryculff	London	SE3	Mainly		5000
Artillery	London	SE18	Yes		3800
Watermens	London	SE20	Yes		3800
James Clavell	London	SE18	Yes		3000
Pavilion	London	SE18	Yes		1300
School	London	SE10	Yes		1500
Palace	London	SE19	Yes		2000
Talisman	London	SE26	Yes		2000
Chiswell	London	SE3	Yes		2100
Gibbs	London	SE19	Yes		2000
Market	Bromley	BR1	Yes		1700
Robert	London	SE13	Yes		2000
Les Smith or Leslie Smith	London	SE18	Yes		880
Kingston	London	SE19	Not mainly		900
Tristan	London	SE3	Yes		800
Old Clem	London	SE18	Mainly		850
St Paul's	Bromley	BR2	Not mainly		580
Roman	London	SE28	Yes		480
Corvette	London	SE10	Yes		380
Collins	London	SE3	Not mainly		350
Oregon	Orpington	BR6	No		0
Peppermead	London	SE13	No		0
Archer	London	SE14	No		0
Beresford	London	SE18	No		0
Reginald	London	SE8	No		0
Ealdham	London	SE9	No		0
Adams	Bexleyheath	DA6	No		0
Brook	London	SE18	No		0
Mortgramit	London	SE18	No		0
Gainsborough	Bexleyheath	DA6	No		0
Regent	Belvedere	DA17	No		0

==== North ====
Name	Post town	Post district	Open to air communal space	Image	m^{2}
Arundel	London	N7	Yes		12000
Cornwallis	London	N19	Mainly		9500
Topham	London	N17	Yes		1600
Broadfield	Enfield	EN1	Yes		1500
Westbrook	Cockfosters, Barnet	EN4	Yes		1500
Sambroke	Barnet	EN4	Yes		800
Albion	London	E8	Yes		5800
Evergreen	London	E8	Yes		4600
Chow	London	E8	Yes		600
Time	London	E8	Yes		300
Schonfeld	London	N16	Not mainly		2000
Christina	London	N4	No		0
Brunswick	London	N17	No		0
Chaplin	London	N12	No		0
Hamilton (Sandringham Gardens)	London	N12	No		0
Red (Piano Lane)	London	N16	No		0

==== South ====
Name	Post town	Post district	Open to air communal space	Image	m^{2}
Exchange	Croydon	CR0	Mainly		4000
Stanley	Carshalton	SM5	Yes		3950
Alexandra	Morden	SM4	Yes		2500
Glebe	Mitcham	CR4	Yes		1350
Kennet	Mitcham	CR4	Yes		1100
Cameron	Mitcham	CR4	Yes		900
Tyrrell	Mitcham	CR4	Yes		650
Appleton	Mitcham	CR4	Yes		350
Torrington	Croydon	CR0	Yes		700
Rathbone (Tanfield Road)	Croydon	CR0	Yes		200
Times	Sutton	SM1	No		0
Wallington	Wallington	SM6	No		0
Queen's	Croydon	CR0	No		0

==== North West ====
Name	Post town	Post district	Open to air communal space	Image	m^{2}
Chelmsford	London	NW4	Yes		6300
South	London	NW11	Mainly		7600
Central	London	NW11	Yes		10000
North	London	NW11	Mainly		7600
Litchfield	London	NW11	Yes		1500
Lucas	London	NW11	Yes		1500
Linden	Harefield, Uxbridge	UB11	Yes		1500
Seaton	London	NW7	Yes		1080
Sentinel	London	NW4	Yes		450
Hampden	London	N14	Yes		5000
Wembley Central	Wembley	HA9	Yes		6400
Belsize	London	NW3	Not mainly		10000
St Leonard's	London	NW5	No		0
Elliott	London	NW3	No		0
New End	London	NW3	No		0
The Mount	London	NW3	No		0
Ashbourne	Northwood	HA6	No		0

=== Demolished ===
- Angel Square, EC1
- Billiter Square, EC3
- Holford Square (Note: became Bevin Court, north of Percy Circus, Pentonville)
- Harewood Square (Note: became forecourt zone between overground and underground Marylebone stations)
- Pancras Square (Note: A very small square.)

== See also ==
- List of garden squares in London
- Parks and open spaces in London

== Notes and references ==
Notes
