= Parks and open spaces in the London Borough of Islington =

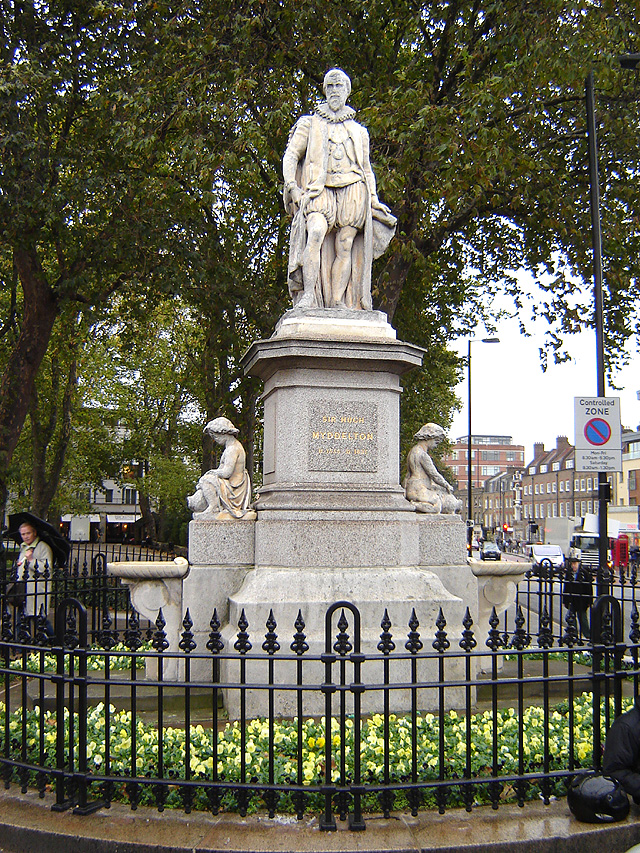
Statue of Sir Hugh Myddleton, surmounting a fountain at the southern end of Islington Green. (November 2005)

The London Borough of Islington is short of large parks and open spaces, given its status in recent decades as a desirable place of residence. In fact, Islington has the lowest ratio of open space to built-up areas of any London borough. The largest continuous open space in the borough, at 11.75 hectares (29 acres), is Highbury Fields.

Islington has access to large open spaces in neighbouring London boroughs. The Islington district of Finsbury Park is next to the southern end of Finsbury Park, in Haringey. The "Green Route" of the Regent's Canal tow path provides access to Regent's Park to the west – in Camden; and Victoria Park to the east – in Tower Hamlets. Many other open spaces such as Clissold Park in Hackney are situated on the borders of the borough. Islington also contains many well-kept public squares and greens, such as Canonbury Square and Thornhill Square.

Because of the perceived open space deficit, many small community gardens grew up in Islington from the 1970s on. Created and maintained by local residents on sites made derelict by the Blitz and redevelopment, not all have survived, but one notable remaining example, open to the public, is Culpeper Community Garden, near the Angel.

== List of open spaces ==
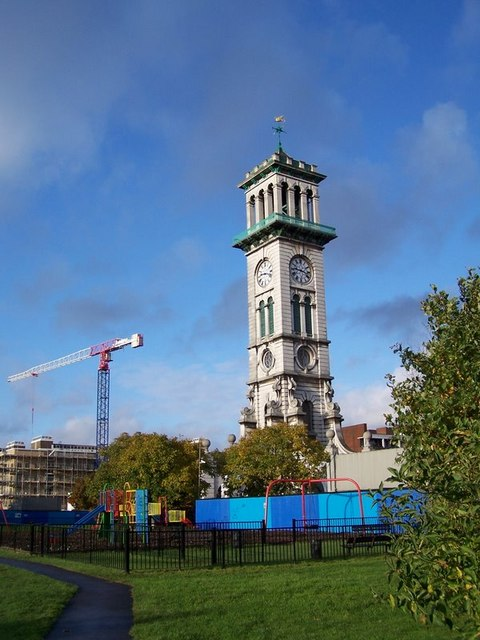
Caledonian Park

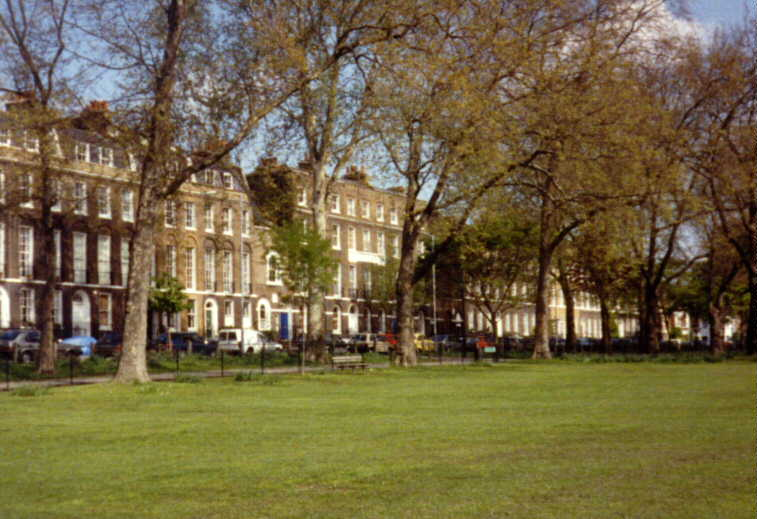
Highbury Terrace on Highbury Fields, the borough's largest open space.

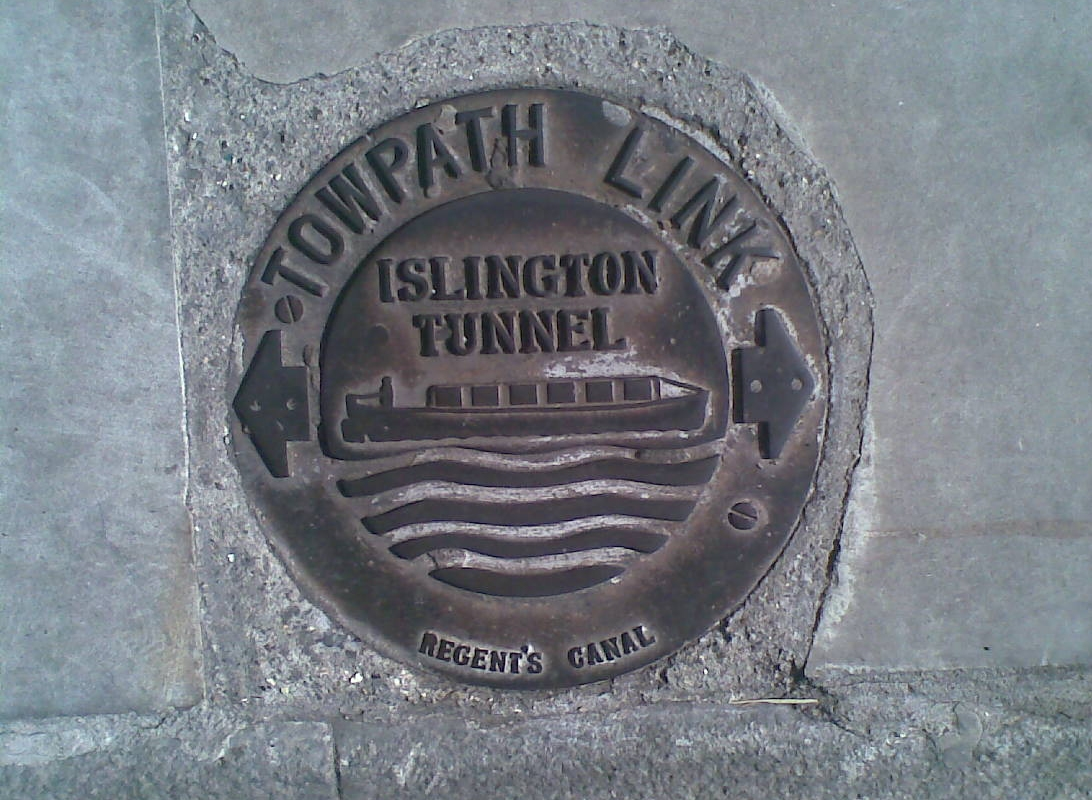
Waymarker for the Islington Tunnel walk

- The Artillery Ground is an 3.2 hectares (7.9 acres) open space on the edge of the city. It has belonged to the Honourable Artillery Company since 1638. While it is not normally open to the public, the ground contains many sports facilities that are used by local schools
- Barnard Park, 3.66 hectares (9.0 acres)
- Bunhill Fields is a 3.2 hectares (7.9 acres) burial ground, adjacent to the Artillery Ground. It contains many dissenter burials, including Daniel Defoe, John Bunyan and William Blake. It is administered by the Corporation of London. Part contains historic graves; but part is laid to a pleasant and quiet park.
- Caledonian Park, 7.40 hectares (18.3 acres) - on the site of the former Caledonian Cattle Market once the biggest cattle market in North London
- Charterhouse Square, 0.80 hectares (2.0 acres), former burial ground converted into a garden square
- Claremont Square contains a covered former reservoir that is closed to the public
- Compton Terrace Garden, 0.38 hectares (0.94 acres)
- Crouch Hill Park is located about halfway along the Parkland Walk
- Duncan Terrace Gardens & Colebrook Row Gardens, 0.77 hectares (1.9 acres)
- Elthorne Park, 2.45 hectares (6.1 acres)
- Finsbury Square, 0.70 hectares (1.7 acres)
- Fortune Street Park, 0.36 hectares (0.89 acres)
- Freightliners City Farm is in Lower Holloway. This small urban farm contains a wide range of animals from rabbits to cows to chickens and pigs
- Graham Street Park, off of City Road Basin
- Highbury Fields, 11.75 hectares (29.0 acres)
- Islington Green, 0.32 hectares (0.79 acres)
- Jewish Burial Ground, 0.51 hectares (1.3 acres)
- Joseph Grimaldi Park, 0.51 hectares (1.3 acres)
- King Square Gardens, 1.18 hectares (2.9 acres), is a park in the St Luke's area
- Laycock Street Open Space, 0.89 hectares (2.2 acres)
- Market Road Gardens, 1.1 hectares (2.7 acres). The Copenhagen Tunnel lies directly underneath.
- New River Walk including Astey's Row Rock Gardens/Astey's Row Playground, 2.09 hectares (5.2 acres) is a linear walk that connects the Angel and Canonbury along the banks of the New River
- Newington Green
- Paradise Park, 1.85 hectares (4.6 acres)
- The Parkland Walk is a linear park along the route of a disused railway line from Finsbury Park to Highgate Woods, a small part of which is in Islington with the rest being in Haringey
- Petherton Green is a linear walk along the route of the New River, which was culverted and covered in 1868–70, and an avenue of trees and grass planted down the middle
- The Regent's Canal enters the Islington Tunnel, near City Road Lock. A linear walk is marked through the streets and parks above the tunnel
- Rosemary Gardens, 2.63 hectares (6.5 acres)
- Spa Fields, 0.82 hectares (2.0 acres)
- St Mary's Church Gardens (also known as Islington Parish Church), 0.69 hectares (1.7 acres)
- St Mary Magdalene Gardens
- Thornhill Gardens (also known as Thornhill Road Gardens), 0.28 hectares (0.69 acres)
- Tufnell Park Playing Fields, 1.92 hectares (4.7 acres)
- Whittington Park, 4.09 hectares (10.1 acres)
- Wray Crescent, 2.13 hectares (5.3 acres)

== Garden squares ==
- Alwyne Square
- Andersons Square
- Arlington Square
- Arundel Square
- Barnsbury Square
- Bartholomew Square
- Canonbury Square
- Charterhouse Square
- Claremont Square
- Cloudesley Square
- Edward Square
- Finsbury Square
- Gibson Square
- Granville Square
- King Square
- Lloyd Square
- Lonsdale Square
- Milner Square
- Myddelton Square
- Northampton Square
- Percy Square
- Thornhill Square
- Tibberton Square
- Union Square, Islington
- Vernon Square
- Wilmington Square
- Wilton Square

== Local Nature Reserves ==
There are three Local Nature Reserves in Islington, Gillespie Park (2.8 hectares (6.9 acres)), Barnsbury Wood (0.35 hectares (0.86 acres)), and the part of the Parkland Walk which is in the borough.

== See also ==
- Copenhagen House Grounds
