= St Andrew's Square =

St Andrew's Square can mean:

- St Andrew's Square, Glasgow
- St Andrew's Square, Kingston upon Thames, a garden square in London
- St Andrew Square, Edinburgh
