= Leinster Square =

Garden squares in Bayswater, London

Coordinates: 51°30′50.9″N 0°11′35.7″W

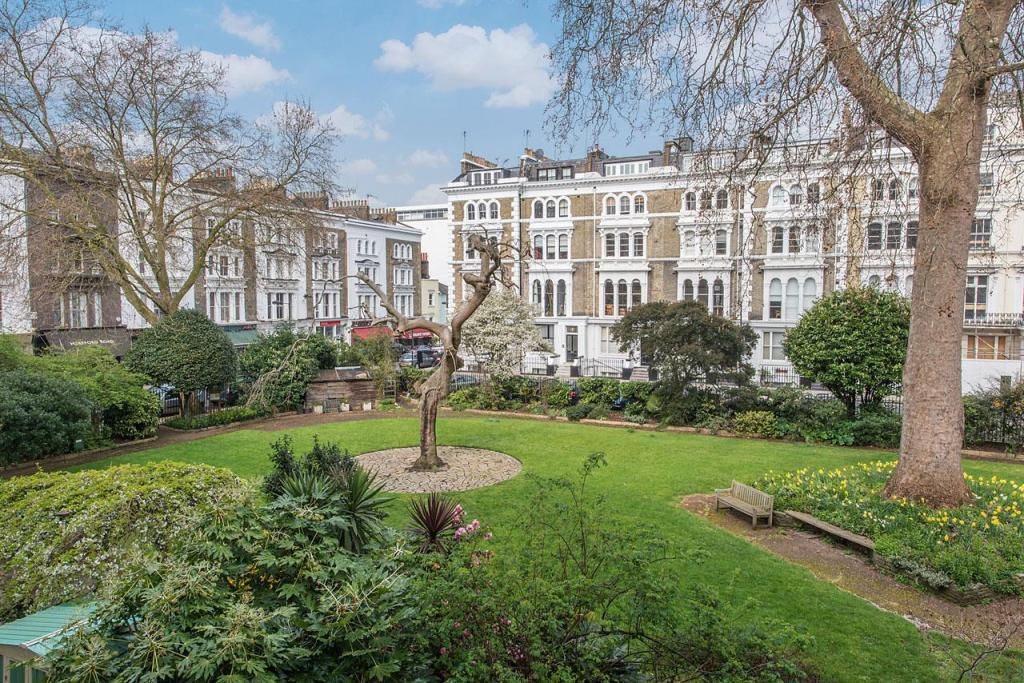
A view of Leinster Square from the gardens.

Leinster Square (/ˈlɛnstə/) and Prince's Square in London are mirroring garden squares in Bayswater on the cusp of Westbourne and Notting Hill. The south side of Leinster Square comprises the north frontage of Prince's Square. It is within the large additions of 1965 to the City of Westminster, London, W2.

The square is in a broad cluster of Victorian estates of private housing with aesthetic landscaping and architecture. These include Prince's Square of symmetrical design, Hereford Road and Garway Road. It is close to Westbourne Grove, the major retail road running across Notting Hill and Tube stations: Bayswater, Queensway and Notting Hill Gate. Much of the area's war damage in the London Blitz was rapidly repaired with houses rebuilt to match the originals.

Tall Victorian terraced houses encompass the square, which, on the Hereford Road side, features a proportion of restaurants and cafés. The buildings have basements with black railings, slate mansard roofs, sash windows and yellow bricks with white stucco projections, pediments and dressings.

The houses surrounding the square are Grade II listed buildings on the National Heritage List for England. The buildings are grouped into individual listings as 1–6, 7–16, 17–20, 23–26, 21 and 22, 27–34, and 38–57 Leinster Square. 35–37 and 58–64 Leinster Square are listed in two groups with buildings in adjacent Prince's Square.

As of 2015, a string of high-end developments was taking place in the square, with new flats and townhouses built behind the façade of two former hotels.

== History ==
Leinster Square was begun along with adjacent Prince's Square in 1856 and finished in 1864, largely the work of the obscure builder and speculator George Wyatt. The plane trees which still today dominate the gardens date from this time, including the one planted in the middle of the garden on 26 February 1887 in Queen Victoria's Jubilee Year.

In 1977, after a period of decline, the garden underwent refurbishment, with extensive planting that largely survives today and the restoration of its iron railings, the originals removed during the Second World War.

As of today the garden is accessible to key-holding residents only and managed by the Leinster Square Gardens Association (LSGA), set up in 1976 to rebuild the gardens after the above-mentioned period of neglect.

== Notable residents ==
- Georgina Fanny Cheffins (1863–1932), militant suffragette, died at 25 Leinster Square.
- Sir Charles Locke Eastlake (1836–1906), director of the National Gallery and author, lived and died at 41 Leinster Square.
- Sting (born 1951), popular musician, lived at 28A Leinster Square in the late 1970s during the formative years of The Police.

In fiction, the chief character of the 1998 film Sliding Doors lived in the square.
