= Argyle Square =

Garden square in London, England

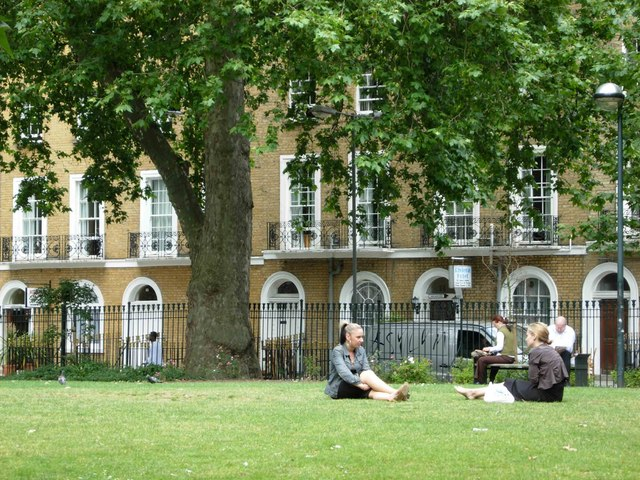
- A view of the interior of the square, with the Grade II-listed buildings in the background.
- Interactive map of Argyle Square
- Type: Garden square
- Location: London, WC1; United Kingdom
- Coordinates: 51°31′44″N 0°7′20″W
- Area: 0.35 hectares (0.86 acres)
- Created: 1830s
- Public transit: King's Cross St Pancras

Argyle Square is a garden square in the London Borough of Camden in London, England. It is the main public park in Kings Cross.

The square was built in the 1830s and 1840s, after the collapse of an attempt to build a music and arts centre in the area. Before its construction, the area was home to one of London's waste dumps. Almost all of the square remains in its original form, with numbers 7 to 47 (i.e. everything but the north side) Grade II-listed.

It was the headquarters of the Swedenborgian movement in England, having been home to the New Jerusalem Church. However, the church was bombed in World War II, and later demolished as unsafe.

Although originally built exclusively for residential properties (other than the church), the square is now home to a number of bed and breakfasts.
