= Barnsbury Wood =

Nature reserve in London, England

Coordinates: 51.541711°N 0.11440283°W

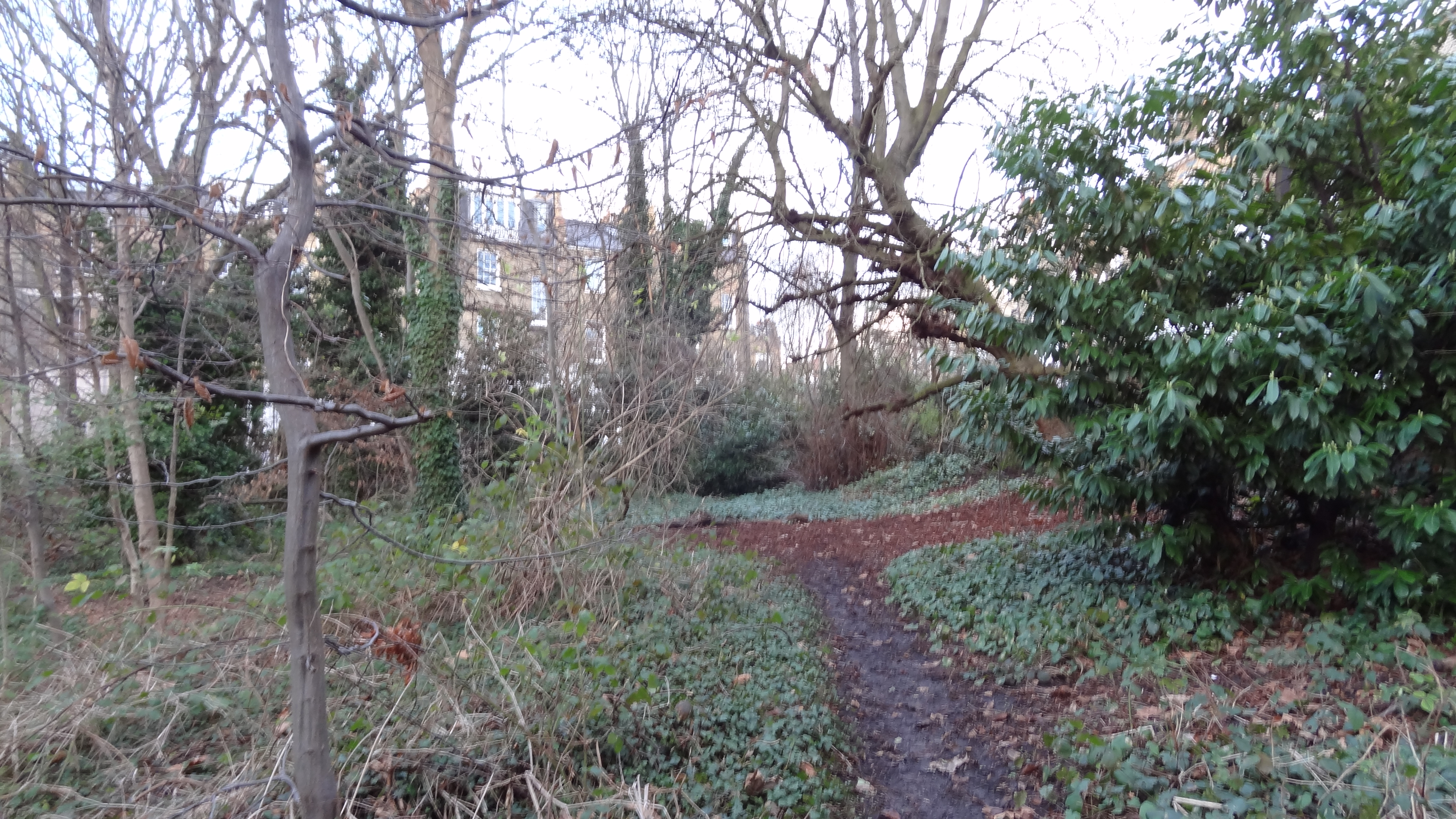

Barnsbury Wood is a Local Nature Reserve and Site of Borough Importance for Nature Conservation, Grade I, in Barnsbury in the London Borough of Islington. With an area of only 0.35 hectares, it is one of the smallest Local Nature Reserve in London It is owned and managed by Islington Council.

In the nineteenth century the site was the garden of the vicarage of St Andrew's Church in Huntingdon Street. In the early twentieth century the garden was abandoned and became woodland. Islington Council purchased it in 1974, proposing to develop it, but in the 1990s it was decided to leave it as woodland and it was declared a Local Nature Reserve. Trees include sycamore, ash, lime and horse chestnut. Birds include the long tailed tit, and there are invertebrates such as the lesser stag beetle and the sixteen spot ladybird.

Barnsbury Wood was used as a location in the Agatha Christie’s Poirot TV episode The Clocks (2011).

There is access to the wood from Crescent Street. It is open from 2 p.m. to 4 p.m. on Tuesdays throughout the year and, with the aid of volunteers, Saturdays in the summer.
