= St Andrew's Square, Surbiton =

Garden square in London, England

Coordinates: 51.3932°N 0.3105°W

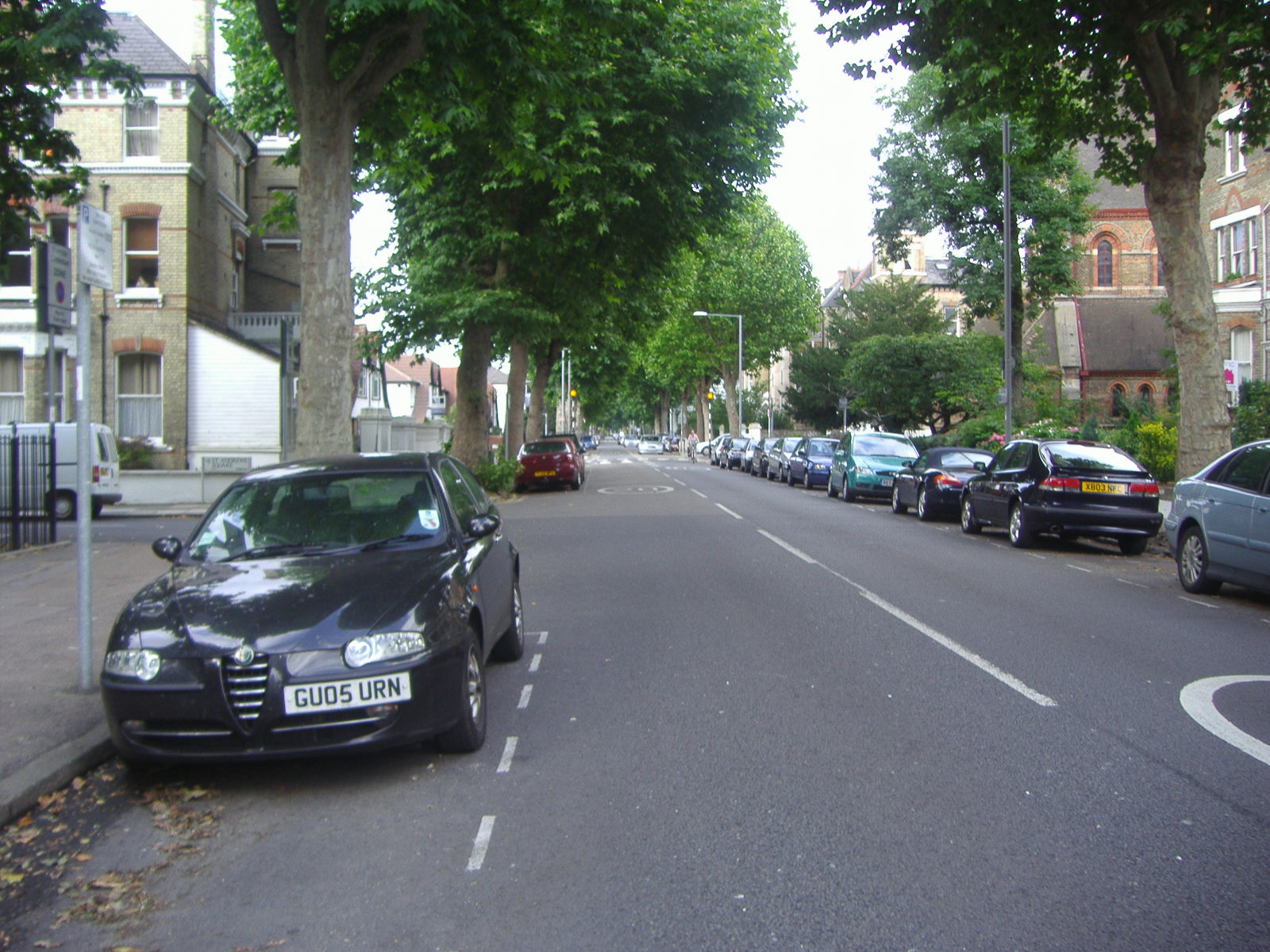
View of the east side of the square, including No.1 and part of central garden's railings

St. Andrews Square (Note: Variants with Royal Mail and local authorities were St Andrew's Square and Saint Andrew's Square which is closest to as said, noting Saint in place names has a typically simplified vowel like said in most British speech.) is a mainly 1876 to 1884-built garden square in Surbiton in the borough of Kingston upon Thames, (Note: Until 1965 the borough's two predecessors were in Surrey) London.

== Layout ==
The houses enclose a zone of 400 feet (120 m) by 240 feet (73 m), so 96,000 square feet (8,900 m^{2}). A railed park takes up a little over half of this space, and the flanking, capillary, streets and pavements are broad.

The eponymous street lines three sides, but not the east (St. James Road). In the north-west corner it has a short continuation fronting 2 1/2 houses. Numbering, where used, is consecutive; to north: No.s 1 to 15 and to south: No.s 30, 30A, 31 to 40. Facing the west side, Little Dell and Little Rex are houses enjoying a garden greater than footprint, the other, Rex House matches the rest of the homes (ratio of the two land uses including much hardstanding to front yards (not part of the original scheme) is near 1:1). Eight apartments occupy the former houses No.s 28 and 29. Some of the houses have been internally split into flats.

Mature, oldest trees and all buildings' façades (their outer design and materials) are strictly protected by being in the conservation area.

== Architecture ==
The borough have made this and parts of two adjoining streets a Conservation Area:

It is an "area of Victorian housing dating from the 1860s – 1880s, in Gothic and Classical styles, including a garden square unique to South West London. It forms a later phase of the Surbiton “New Town” begun in 1838 by Thomas Pooley."

It "is one of the few remaining Victorian squares in SW London and is the only example of traditional Victorian square development in the borough. Three sides of the square are lined with closely-knit three-storey brick Victorian terraced houses built between 1876–1884 by local developers Corbett and McClymont in the Gothic style. In addition to these...[included is] St Andrews Church, the central garden of the Square and the interesting group of Victorian houses on Maple Road in the Classical style.

Apart from six mid-19th-century stuccoed houses on the north side of St. James Road (№s. 72-82), and three mid 19th century houses at Nos 61 - 65 Maple Road, all of the houses [herein] were built at the same time and by the same developers, Corbett and McClymont."

The west end of St Andrew's Church, Surbiton faces a point of the eastern side's road (Maple Road) just north of the north-west corner of the square. It is a Grade II listed building (statutorily protected and recognised in the mainstream, initial category of the scheme).

In the local planning scheme, a lesser protection of Locally Listed Building applies to: 1–15 and 32–40 St. Andrews Square and facing or nearby in the Conservation Area: 14–42, 46–60, 61–65 and 17–25 Maple Road; and 17–25 St. James Road.

== Footnotes and citations ==
Notes

Citations;
