= Surrey Square =

Garden square in London, England

Coordinates: 51°29′18″N 0°04′55″W

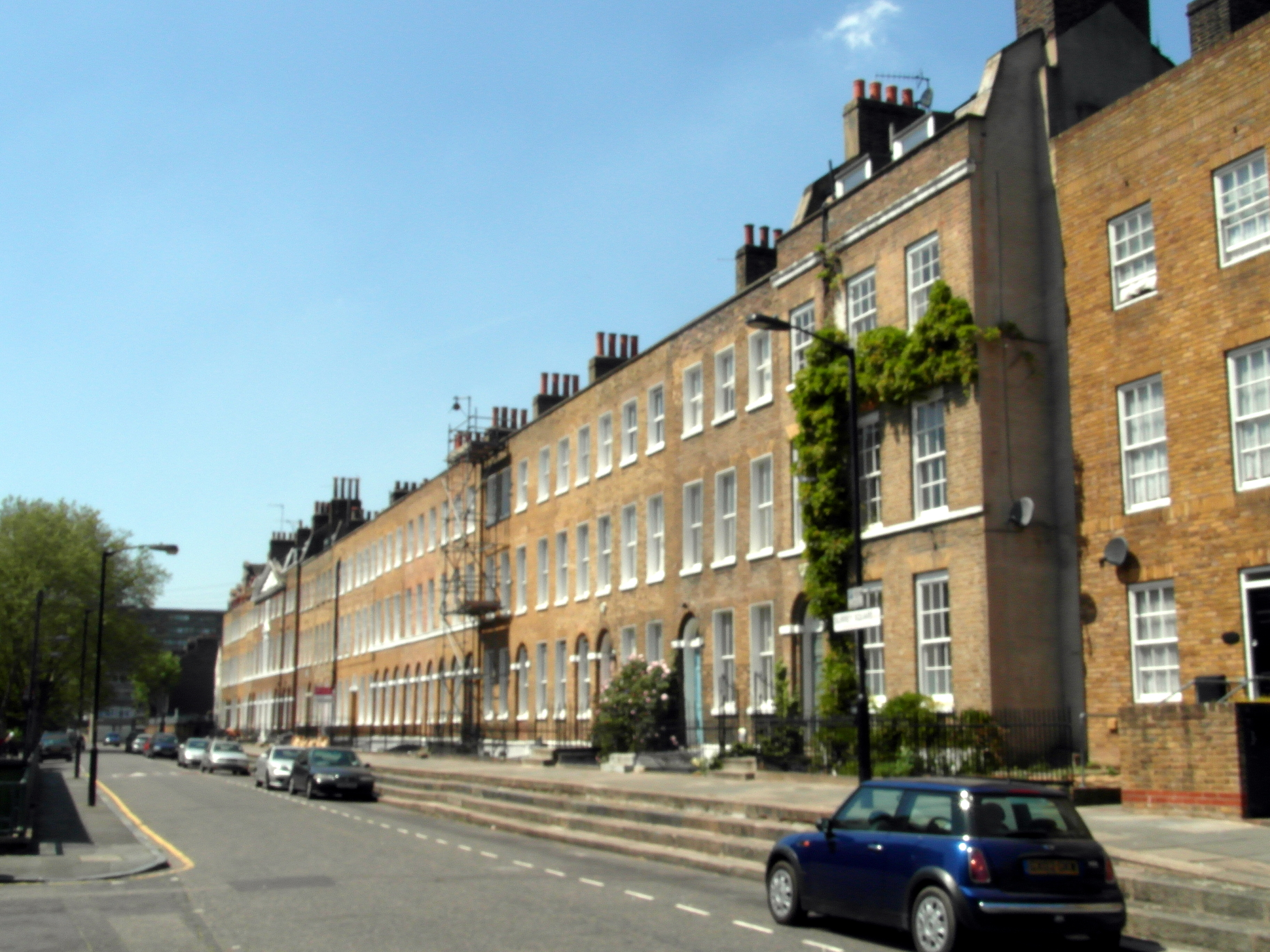
Surviving original Georgian houses.

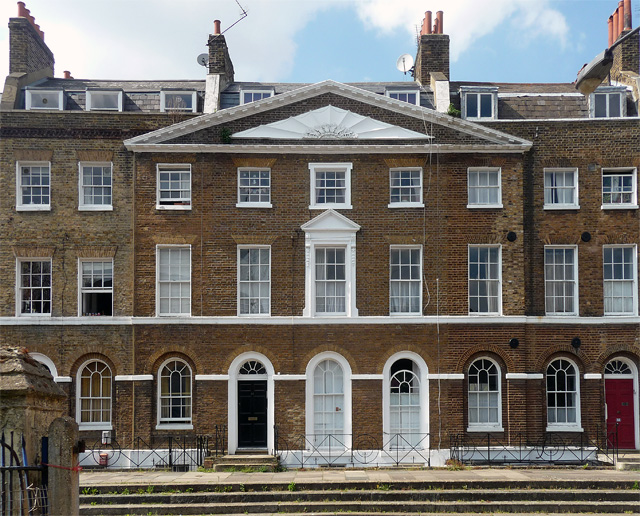
44-48 Surrey Square.

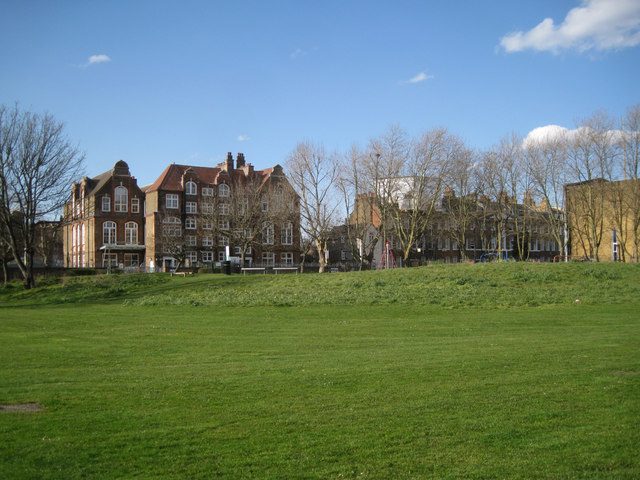
Surrey Square Primary School across Surrey Square Park.

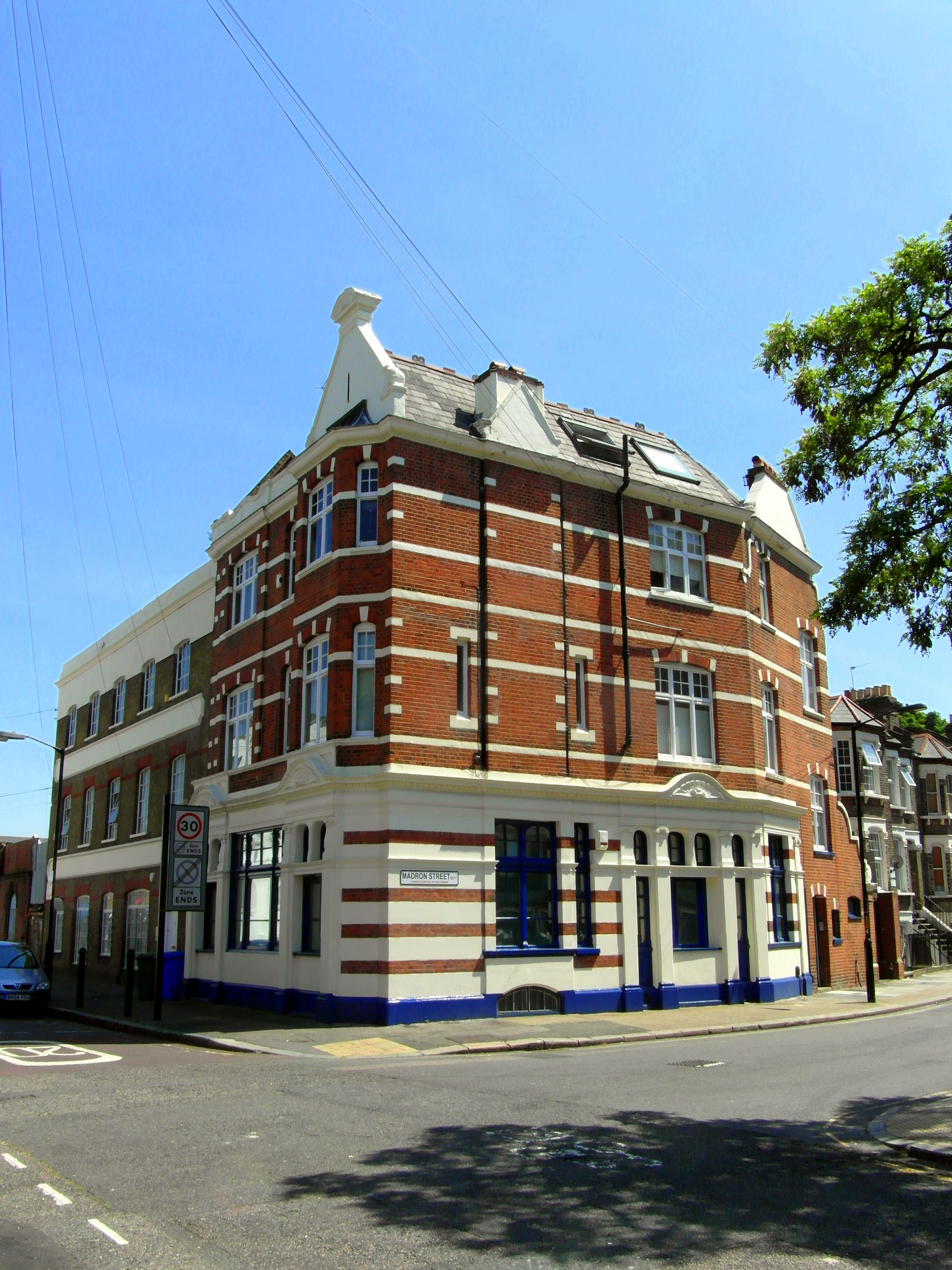
Former pub, the Surrey Arms.

Surrey Square is a garden square in Walworth in the London Borough of Southwark. Located just off the Old Kent Road it was laid out in the 1790s to designs by the architect Michael Searles, who also oversaw the nearby Paragon at what is now Bricklayers Arms. The square takes its name from the county of Surrey in which Walworth was traditionally located. When built it would have been semi-rural and designed to provide upmarket housing for the expanding population of the capital. Within two years of the first stone being laid in 1792 it was fully occupied. Amongst notable early residents was the painter Samuel Palmer who was born there in 1805.

While northern side of the square was filled with terraced housing, the other three were initially open spaces. They were slowly filled with individual houses and All Saints Church. The square, already oblong-shaped came to and less and less resemble a traditional square as more buildings were added to fill up the middle section, part of which is now known as Surrey Square Park. Surrey Square Primary School is located on the northern side.

== Bibliography ==
- Baxter, Mark & Lock, Darren. Walworth Through Time. Amberley Publishing Limited, 2010.
- Campbell-Johnston, Rachel. Mysterious Wisdom: The Life and Work of Samuel Palmer. Bloomsbury Publishing, 2012.
- Cherry, Bridget & Pevsner, Nikolaus. London 4: South. Yale University Press, 2002.
- Fairfield, Sheila. The Streets Of London: A Dictionary Of The Names And Their Origins. Papermac, 1983.
