= Thornhill Square =

Public gardens in north London, United Kingdom

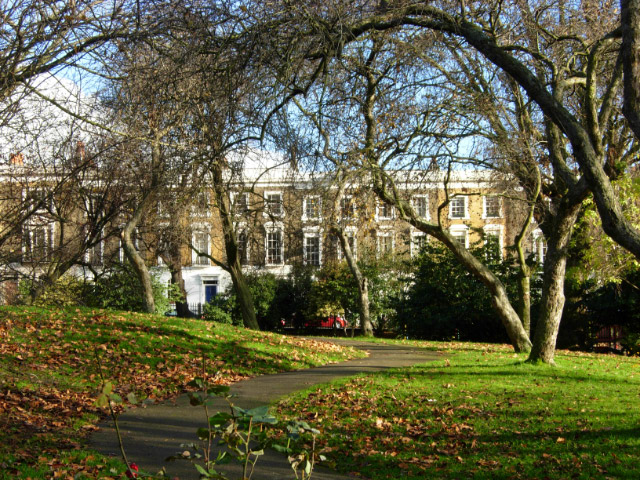
- Thornhill Square

- Location within London Borough of Islington
- Postal code: N1
- Coordinates: 51.540545°N 0.115195°W

Construction
- Construction start: 1847
- Completed: 1852

Thornhill Square together with the adjacent Thornhill Crescent form a garden square in the Barnsbury district of Islington, North London. It is bounded by Victorian terraced houses, all of which are listed buildings. The central public gardens contain flower beds, mature trees, and a children's play area, and the Crescent gardens surround the Victorian Church of St Andrew.

== History ==
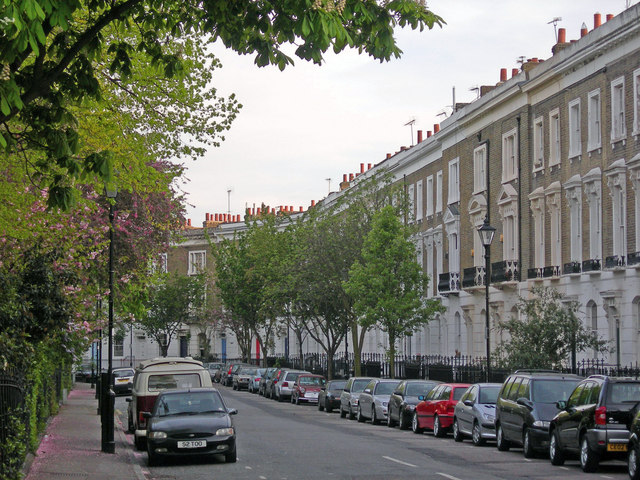
Thornhill Square - west side, looking south

The extensive Thornhill Estate in Barnsbury was owned by the wealthy Thornhill family, originally from Yorkshire, who had acquired a substantial amount of land in the area which was primarily let for dairy farming. Several plans were drawn up between 1810 and 1847 for housing development on the estate, but little progress was made until the 1830s, under the ownership of George Thornhill. Construction of Thornhill Square by builders G.S.S. Williams & Son commenced around 1847, starting on the west side. A rich local dairy farmer, Samuel Pocock, built Thornhill Crescent starting around 1849.

With the substantial growth in the population as a result of new housing, additional new churches were needed in Islington. The site for a church was donated in 1852 by George Thornhill, and the large church of St Andrew was built here in 1852-54, seating 1,650. Thornhill also gave £500 towards the building costs, and Samuel Pocock gave £100 for the railings. Mr Wontner, builder of nearby Tibberton Square, gave £2. (Note: The source is mistaken, as Thomas Wontner, the builder of Tibberton Square, died in 1831. The donor was probably his son Joseph.) After winning the design competition, the church design was completed by John Johnson and Francis B. Newman and it was built by Dove Brothers Ltd, who were a Barnsbury based construction company from 1781 to 1993. The church was consecrated in 1854 by the Bishop of London, Dr Charles Blomfield in the presence of the Lord Mayor of London and other City dignitaries, indicating the prosperous status of the estate and its new residents. The £6,500 cost exceeded the sum stated in the competition conditions and, on completion, debts of over £2,000 were still outstanding.

Residents of the new estate were well-to-do, including lawyers, doctors, merchants and retired clergy. From 1854 Thornhill College for Ladies, no. 1A Thornhill Crescent, offered a broad education, including French, drawing, and music, and preparation for university and public examinations. In 1884 there were 40 boarders and day pupils.

In 1906 nos. 64 & 65 Thornhill Square were demolished to make way for a new library. Islington West Library was designed by Professor Arthur Beresford Pite, the architect of the south end of Burlington Arcade, was built by C. Dearing & Co., and opened in 1907. £5,000 of the £8,700 cost of the building was from the library fund of Andrew Carnegie.

Charles Booth’s poverty map of c.1890 shows Thornhill Square households as “Middle-class. Well to-do”, and those of Thornhill Crescent as "Fairly comfortable. Good ordinary earnings". However as the 20th century progressed, the area became run-down like much of Islington. The Thornhill family interest ceased with the death of Captain Noel Thornhill in 1955, and there were rumours that the estate might be broken up and redeveloped. By 1959 about a third of the property in the surrounding square mile was condemned for rebuilding by Islington Council, and the vicar claimed that women were afraid to attend church on dark evenings because of the disagreeable neighbourhood. However, as the area became newly fashionable as part of the gentrification of Islington in the 1960s and 1970s, many of the freeholds were privately purchased by occupants and the houses were rehabilitated. It was one of the later areas of Barnsbury to be reclaimed and rehabilitated.

== Description ==
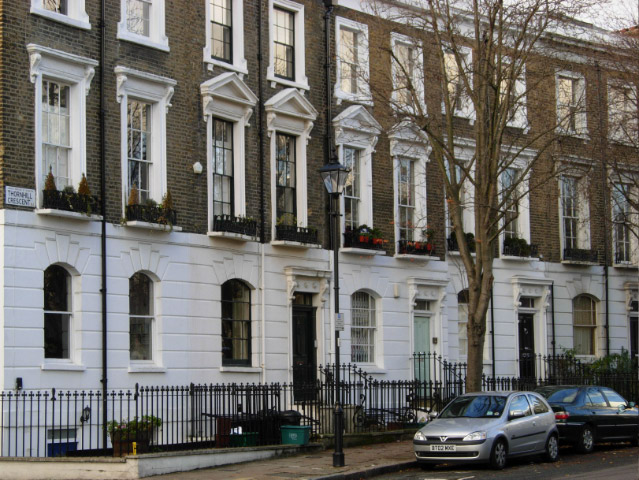
Thornhill Crescent - southwest end

Thornhill Square is the largest square in Islington and was for many years one of its largest open spaces, although for many years the gardens were open only to key-holders. Thornhill Square together with Thornhill Crescent form an unusual large ovoid ellipse. The houses are grouped in series, with houses with paired square-headed windows punctuated with sets of three with single windows, with the result that triangular pediments are flanked by semi-circular ones. The houses were built with conservatories at the rear, many of which remain.

== Church of St Andrew ==
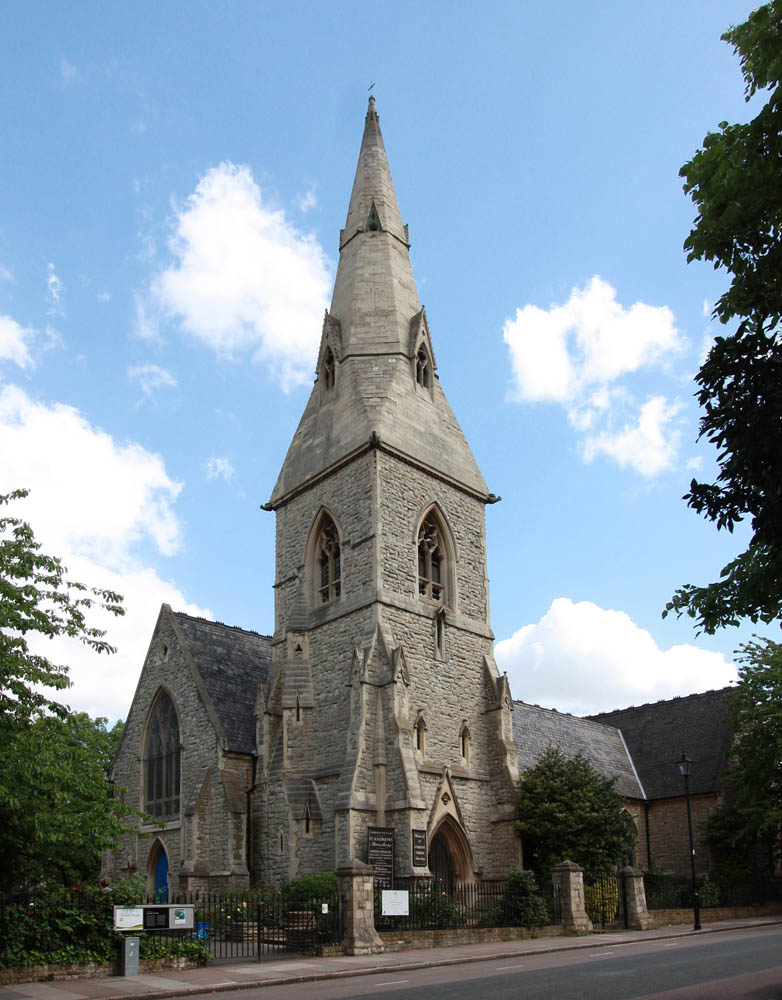
Church of St Andrew

The church is built of Kentish rag-stone and Bath stone, in Decorated neo-Gothic "middle-pointed" style. An east window was added in 1873. The Ecclesiologist journal described the church as "an ostentatious cruciform pile, all gables and transepts, with an exaggerated broach".

== Islington West Library ==
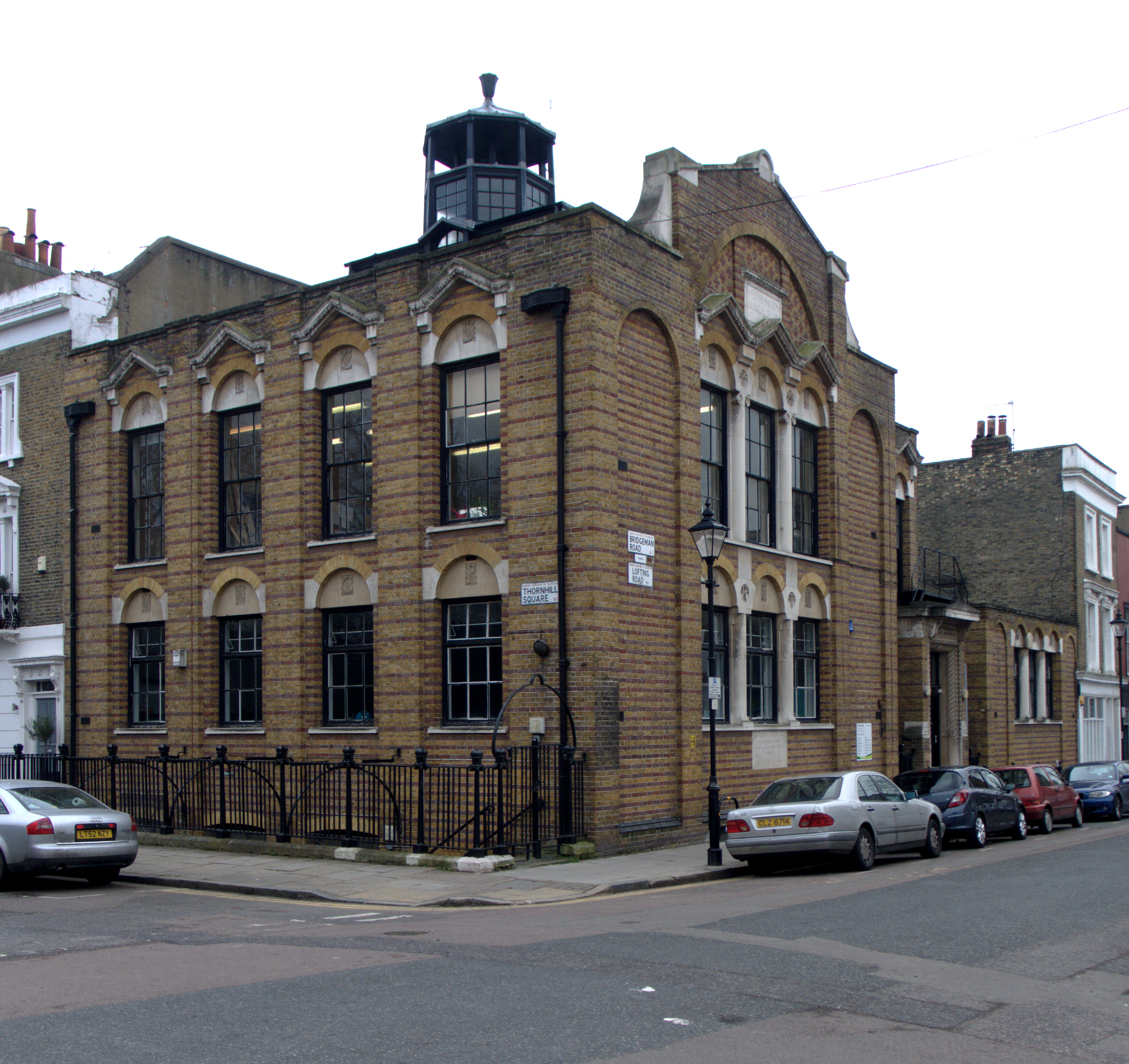
Islington West Library

The building has a temple-like main front, and is capped with an octagonal roof lantern. Arts and Crafts, or possibly Art Nouveau, style letters of the alphabet are carved on the panels above the windows. It is part of the Islington Libraries system.

== Gardens ==
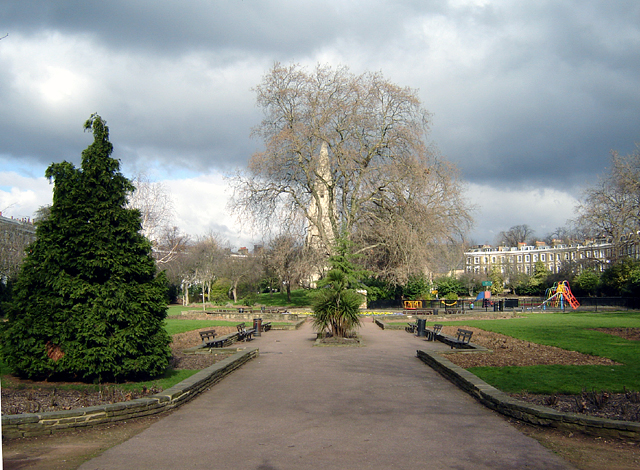
Thornhill Square gardens

Originally Thornhill Square gardens were provided for the private use of the residents of the square, and in the early days were mainly better-off professional classes. The gardens were Islington's largest (though private) recreational space until Highbury Fields were acquired in the 1880s. The railings enclosing the garden date from 1852, having survived removal in the Second World War when many garden squares lost their railings. This was supposedly to provide scrap metal for munitions, but there is some scepticism as to whether they were actually used for this purpose. Historical paint analysis of the railings has shown that when first installed, they were painted a patina green to mimic weathered bronze, a common theme of early Georgian architecture.

Captain Noel Thornhill donated the gardens to Islington Council in 1947 for public use, and in 1953 the gardens were re-designed and landscaped with formal flowerbeds and a children’s playground as part of the Council’s “Coronation Year” improvements. Planting includes shrub borders, ornamental displays and rose beds, with paths, lawns and seating, and a mound to the north.

St Andrew's Church is surrounded by a garden laid out with flower beds, paths and shrubs, with trees around its perimeter.

== Notable residents ==
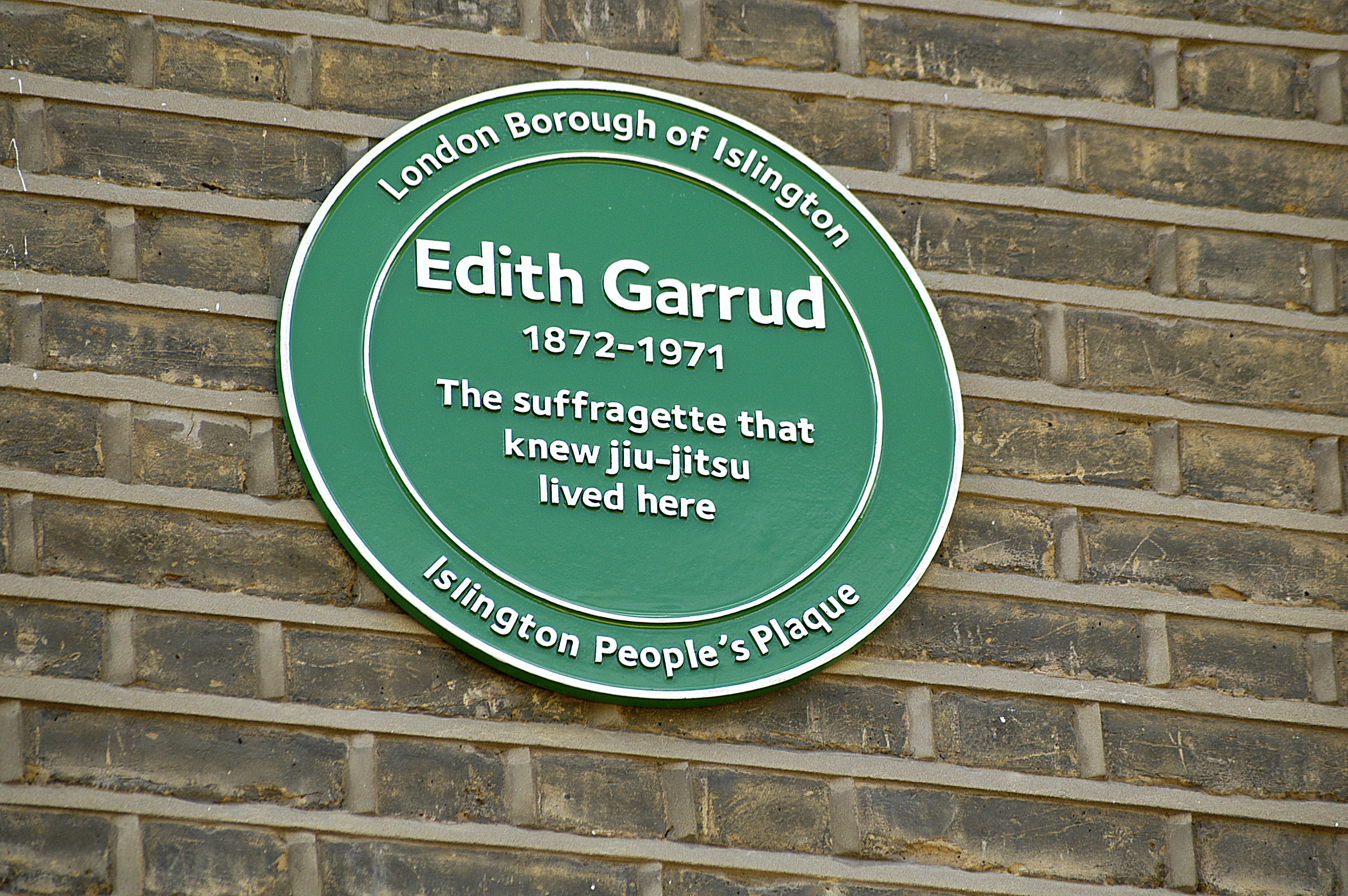
Commemorative plaque in Thornhill Square, outside Garrud's former home

Edith Garrud (1872–1971), gave training in jujutsu and the use of Indian club to "the Bodyguard", a suffragette unit to protect Emmeline Pankhurst. She lived at 60 Thornhill Square, and is commemorated there with a plaque.

Author, broadcaster and academic Ian Bradley lived in Thornhill Square in the 1970s.

== Cultural references ==
Thornhill Square and Thornhill Crescent appear in the film V for Vendetta (2005), and in the Agatha Christie’s Poirot TV episode The Clocks (2011).

In Andrew O'Hagan's 2024 novel Caledonian Road, the fictional number 68 Thornhill Square is the home of the protagonist, Campbell Flynn. The square serves as a symbol of affluent, gentrified North London, contrasting with the nearby lower-income neighbourhoods.
