= Barnsbury =

Coordinates: 51.54183849338327°N 0.11060897251564092°W

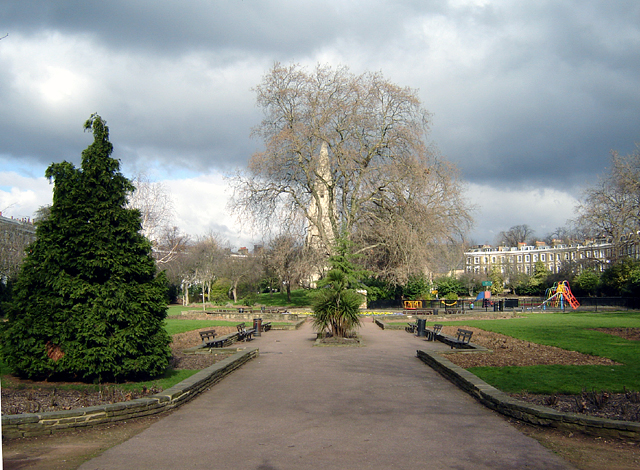
- Thornhill Square

- Location within Greater London
- OS grid reference: TQ305845
- London borough: Islington
- Ceremonial county: Greater London
- Region: London
- Country: England
- Sovereign state: United Kingdom
- Post town: LONDON
- Postcode district: N1, N7
- Dialling code: 020
- Police: Metropolitan
- Fire: London
- Ambulance: London
- UK Parliament: Islington South and Finsbury
- London Assembly: North East

A map showing the Barnsbury ward of Islington Metropolitan Borough as it appeared in 1916.

Barnsbury is an area of north London in the London Borough of Islington, within the N1 and N7 postal districts.

== History ==
The name is a syncopated form of Bernersbury (1274), being so called after the Berners family: powerful medieval manorial lords who gained ownership of a large part of Islington after the Norman Conquest. The area of Barnsbury was predominantly rural until the early 19th century.

By the end of the 18th century, Barnsbury, like other parts of Islington, was regarded as an attractive part-rural suburb by the comparatively wealthy people wanting to move out of the cramped City of London and industrial Clerkenwell. The area is close to the city, and had strong local trade in its position as the first staging post for travellers making the journey from London to the north, and with considerable agricultural traffic and cattle driving to the nearby Smithfield cattle market in the city.

Barnard Park, consisting of 10 acres (4 hectares) including a large area of football pitches, was created in 1967 on an area of housing that had been bombed during World War Two, and was named after former Islington Mayor Cllr George Barnard.

Pentonville Prison (built 1842) is located within Barnsbury.

== Governance ==
Since 2006, Barnsbury electoral ward has been represented by three Labour councillors.

== Notable people ==
- Tony and Cherie Blair, former Prime Minister and his wife, lived in Barnsbury with their family.
- Michael Faraday (1791–1867), chemist
- Owen Jones (born 1984), Labour activist
- Enid Marx (1902–1998) painter and designer, known for industrial textile designs for the London Transport Board and the Utility furniture Scheme.
- Ivor Moreton (1908–1984), pianist and singer, born in Barnsbury
- Grayson Perry (born 1960), artist
- Emily Thornberry (born 1960), Labour Party MP for Islington South and Finsbury

== Nearest stations ==
- Caledonian Road & Barnsbury Overground station
- Angel tube station
- Caledonian Road tube station
- Highbury and Islington station
- Holloway Road tube station
