= Merrick Square =

Garden square in Newington, London

Coordinates: 51.4980°N 0.0922°W

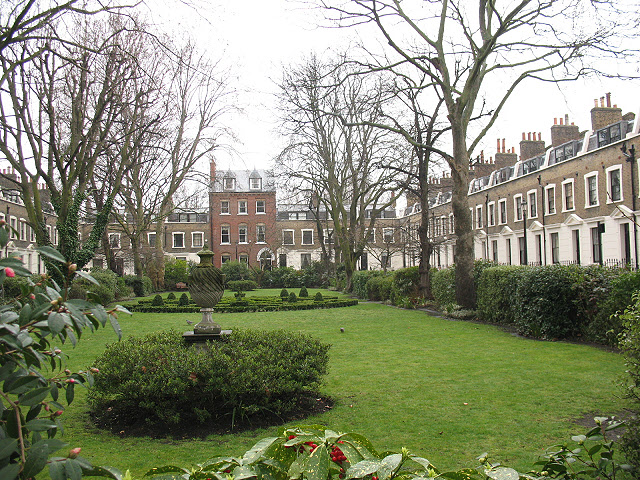
Merrick Square

Merrick Square is a garden square in Newington, London. The square is named after Christopher Merrick, a London merchant who in 1661 left land to Trinity House Corporation. The Corporation subsequently developed housing on the land, grouped around a series of squares of which Merrick Square is one.

There are 32 houses that were built from 1853 to 1872, and they overlook a private garden in the centre, which is still enclosed by its original 19th-century cast-iron railings.

The rectory of Holy Trinity church sits between 16 and 17 Merrick Square on the south-west side.

In 1861, the cricketer Alfred Mynn died at his brother's house at 22 Merrick Square.
