= Granville Square, London =

Garden square in London, England

Coordinates: 51.528006°N 0.113379°W

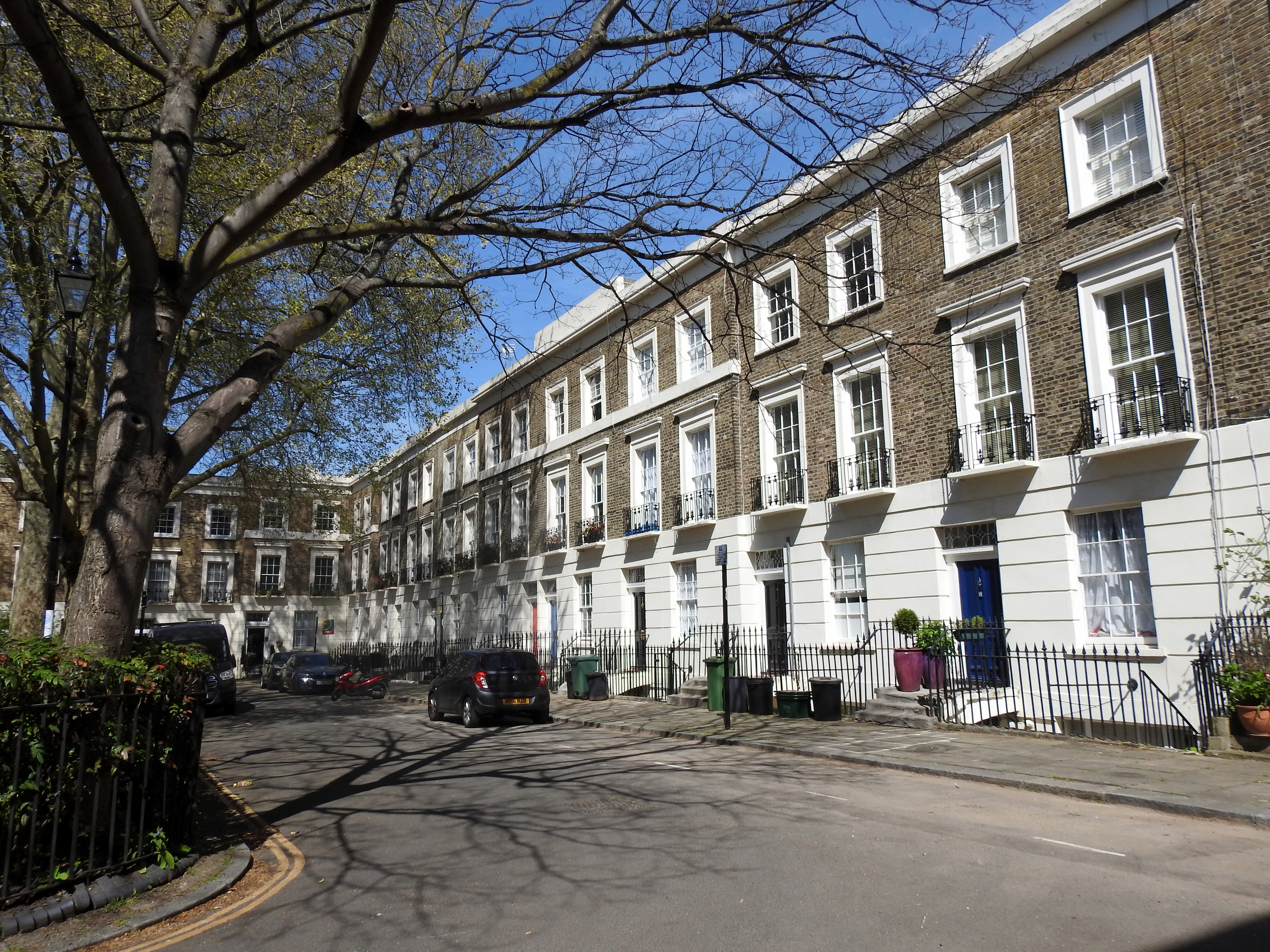
Houses in Granville Square

Granville Square is a garden square in the Clerkenwell area of London. The square was developed as part of the Lloyd Baker Estate, and is connected to Lloyd Baker street in the south and Wharton Street in the north.

== History and description ==
Granville Square was laid out as part of the development of the wider Lloyd Baker Estate. Originally the land was held by a brick maker, George Randell whose lease would expire in 1828. As he was not maintaining the land, it became a place for fly-tipping. As a result building of houses was postponed to 1839, with St Phillip's Church (demolished in 1936) going up in 1832.

The name for the square was originally intended as Sharp Square, for Granville Sharp, the philanthropist and abolitionist. Potential association with the nearby Sharp's Alley, considered of ill-repute, led to the change to Granville. The houses are generally of brick and stucco, in an early Victorian style, and many are Grade II listed for their architectural interest. They are possibly the designs of W. J. Booth, then surveyor of the estate.

In the 1860s, the west side of the square, including the church, was demolished for construction of the Metropolitan Railway, and houses were replaced afterwards by Charles Ardon Kellond between 1873 and 1874. Notable residents of the square include Warwick William Wroth and Joseph Grego. Lenin's revolutionary newspaper Iskra also operated in the square around 1903, with Lenin himself living in nearby Percy Circus briefly in 1905.

The Lloyd Baker family remained owners of the estate until much of it, including Granville Square, was acquired by Islington Council who refurbished the run-down square and redeveloped most of the houses into flats.

== See also ==
- Lloyd Square
- Percy Circus
