= De Beauvoir Square =

Garden square in London, England

Coordinates: 51.541251°N 0.078756°W

Houses of De Beauvoir Square

De Beauvoir Square is a garden square in the Hackney area of London. It is part of De Beauvoir Town, a late Georgian planned town which had an original design including four squares and an octagon. Due to legal issues however, it was the only one eventually built.

== History and description ==
The town was devised by William Rhodes, grandfather of Cecil Rhodes. The square's east side had been completed by 1823, a sixteen house terrace known as Park Place, but following legal issues the land reverted to the ownership of Richard Benyon de Beauvoir in 1834. Building work recommenced in 1838 on the north side with the west and south completing in the 1840s. The works were carried out by chief builder Thomas Smith with designs possibly by William Conrad Lochner or Alexander Dick Gough. The houses are of a Jacobethan or Tudor style common in the area, described by Nikolaus Pevsner as cottage orné villas.

The central garden is formally arranged, opened to the public in the 1890s. The northwest houses suffered bomb damage during the Second World War and were replaced by flats built in a similar style. The east side was demolished in the 1960s to make way for part of the Lockner Estate, much less inkeeping with the architecture of the rest of the square. The houses on the north west and south are all Grade II listed.
