= Warwick Square =

Garden square in Pimlico, London, England

Coordinates: 51°29′26.44″N 0°8′28.59″W

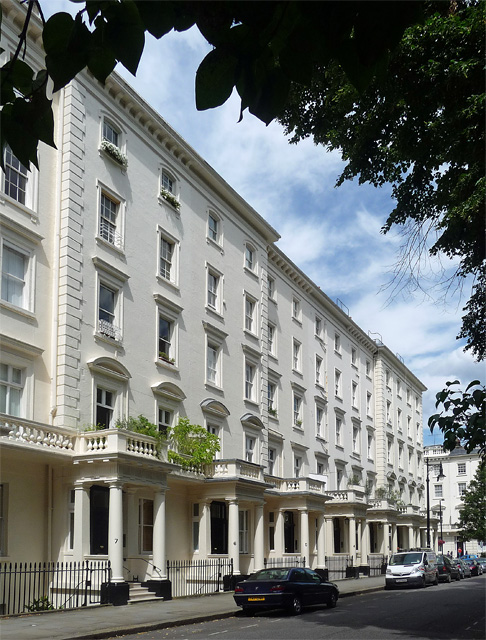
1–7 Warwick Square in July 2012

Warwick Square is a garden square in the Pimlico district of London SW1. The church in the square, St Gabriel's, is listed Grade II*. The other buildings fronting the square are listed Grade II on the National Heritage List for England. The private gardens at the centre of the square are Grade II listed on the Register of Historic Parks and Gardens.

== Layout and architecture ==
An outlier (anomaly) is No.33 which is beyond the south corner of the rectangle – it has views of parts of the square from its front.

The group of four K6 telephone boxes (deemed) on Belgrave Road next to the garden wall of No.1 are listed Grade II.

No.s 1–23, 26–33, 49–80 which are the fronting buildings save for a church, have national protection and recognition (that is by statutory listed building status); they are in the initial, mainstream category, Grade II.

The square began with roads and pipes in 1843 and the terraces around it were completed in the next few years. No.33 was built from 1860 to 1866 by George Morgan as a studio and mansion. No.66 was Thomas Cubitt's home and office at the time he was developing the square. It was converted into five apartments in 2018.
