= Tibberton Square =

Square in Islington, London, England

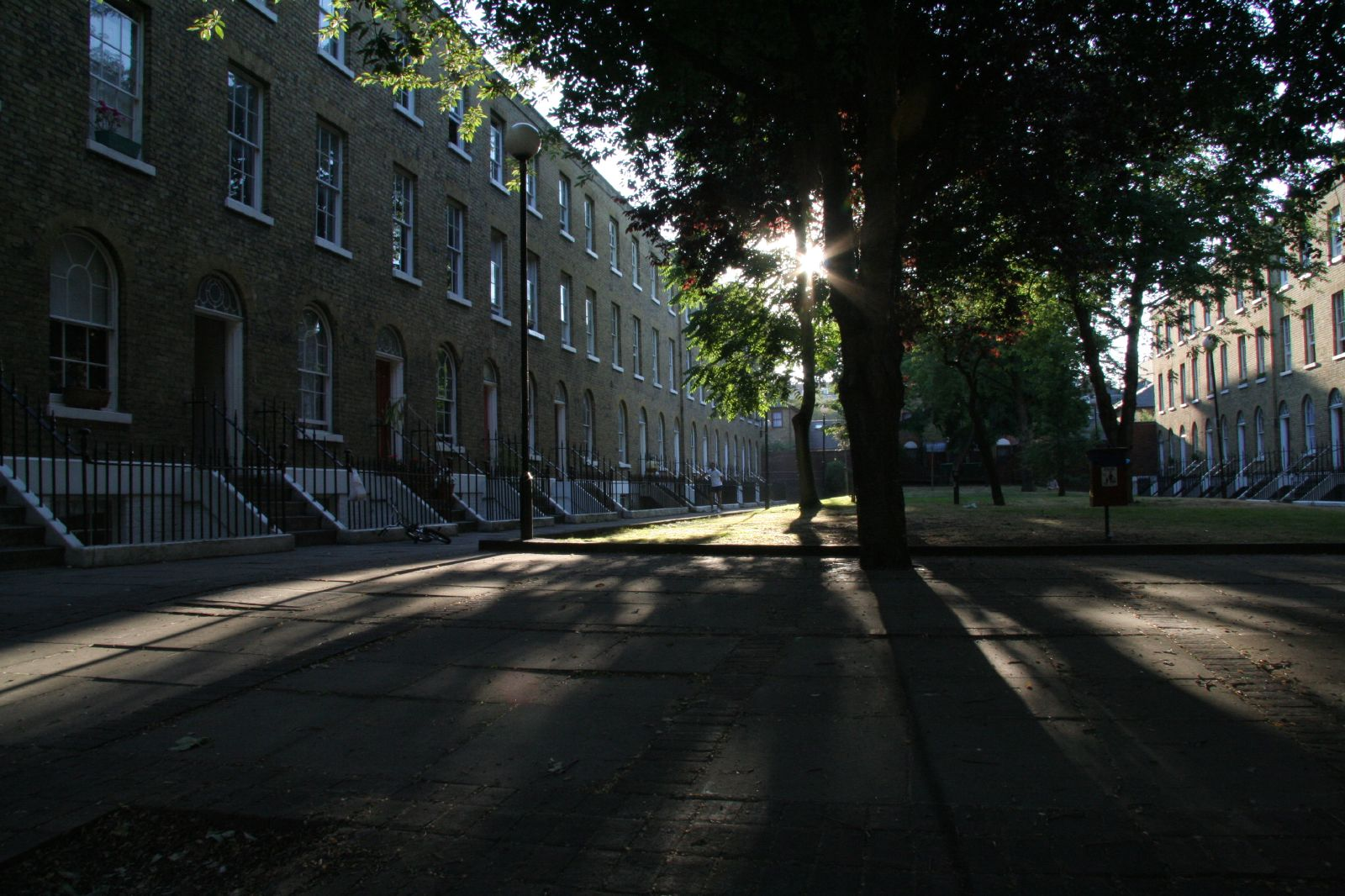

- Location within London Borough of Islington
- Postal code: N1
- Coordinates: 51.5394393062037°N 0.09546074633199633°W

Construction
- Construction start: 1823
- Completion: 1828

Tibberton Square is a small garden square in Islington, North London. It is bounded on two sides by terraces of Georgian houses which are Grade II listed buildings. Thomas Wontner, a wealthy hat manufacturer, built the square on his own garden between 1823 and 1828.

== History ==
Thomas Wontner (1747–1831) came from Herefordshire with his wife and brother, and was apprenticed in the hat trade, in which he was successful. With his watchmaker brother John, he moved from their Minories factories to Islington. He established a business near Essex Road, employing up to 50 men to sort skins, especially beaver and seal, for making gentlemen's hats. Thomas went on to become Master of the Worshipful Company of Feltmakers.

Wontner built himself a villa nearby with a large front garden, and moved there in 1808. After his wife died in 1823, he built a row of houses on part of his garden, named after his wife's home village of Tibberton in Worcestershire, where they first met. This was the start of the square, which eventually comprised two east-west terraces and two larger houses at the narrower north-western end. The fourth side was never built. The Wontner residence was at no. 16.

Charles Booth’s poverty map of c. 1890 shows most Tibberton Square households as "Mixed. Some comfortable others poor."

In 1894, the west side of the square including the Wontner villa and the larger houses was razed to build Greenman Street Baths, necessary under the Public Baths and Wash-Houses Act 1846, which required that these be provided for the community. The rest of the square was sold in 1896.

Subsequently the houses went down in the world, and came into multiple occupation. During the Second World War the ornamental railings and wrought-iron gates at the south-east end were removed for scrap. By 1970 only three houses were in single-family occupation, 46 households had no bath, and 28 had no water supply. The square was acquired by the London Borough of Islington and restored: some houses were converted into flats laterally, the square was pedestrianised, and new railings were installed. The completed conversion was one of nine in the London area highly commended in a 1980 Department of the Environment competition. Greenman Street Baths (known locally as "Tibs") were demolished in 1984, and Wontner Close was built on part of the site in 1987.
