= Lloyd Square =

Garden square in London

Coordinates: 51.5285°N 0.1120°W

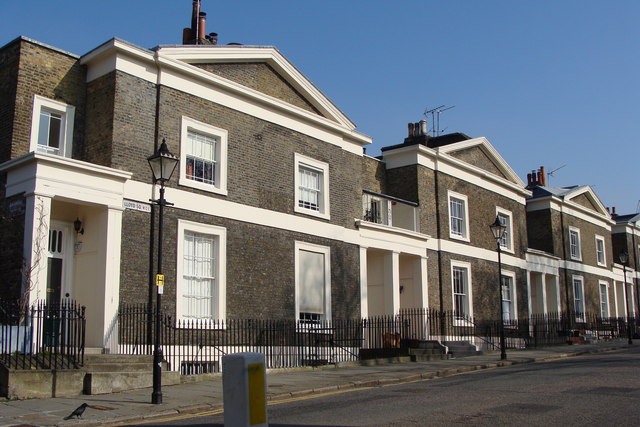
Some of the houses, fronting.

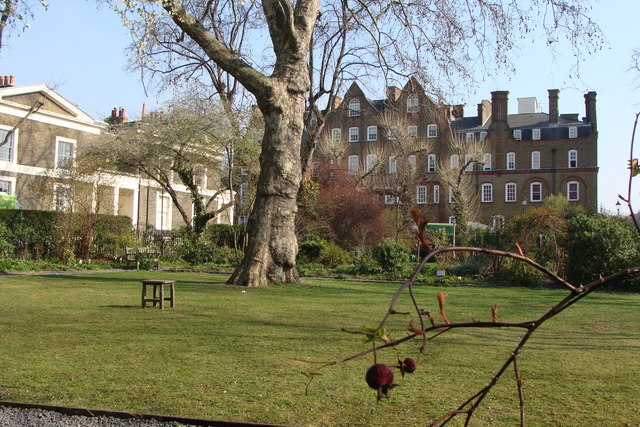
Garden internally

Lloyd Square, a garden square in Clerkenwell, central London, It consists of Grade II Listed houses making up a square of unique and noted character in central London. Its nearest tube stations are Kings Cross, Russell Square, Farringdon, Angel and Chancery Lane. The square has mature trees, flowers, beds and shrubs and is lined by neat hedges and formal railings, which are listed.

== Architecture ==
The listing for the short row starting with 14 describes a terrace of ten semi-detached, linked, villas of 1832 on the upper (north) side. Planned in 1822, the South side was built in 1828 and the remainder, laid out in 1832 - all by John Booth and son John, surveyors. The senior's other son, William J. Booth was architect for the homes on this land, before his work, belonging to the Lloyd Baker family who managed & owned it as "The Lloyd Baker Estate". Brown and "gold" stock bricks, some darkened by coal pollution chiefly before the Clean Air Act 1956 and accumulation of less-dark hydrocarbon/diesel particulates, are set in Flemish bond for the house walls with classical stucco dressings and one grand pediment per pair. The roofs, often extended are above gables and feature Welsh and false slate, parts being obscured by parapet walls; they have brick central chimney stacks.

The dimensions and colours are of a restrained Greek Revival style: two-storeys with a basement; two main projecting window-bays per front per floor, and a recessed small-window entrance bay coupled as a link. The left-hand and right-hand walls to the far ends with scattered windows. Low steps rise to a deeply recessed stucco entrance with antae supporting the entablature, save No. 15 (altered). Architraved doorways have a corniced-head, rectangular, overlight and original panelled door except nos. 14 and 18. No. 20's has a reeded surround with corner stops. Architraved sash windows are used. No. 17 has cast-iron window guards. The first floor adds margin lights (windows) and balconies to the recessed (property) links with narrower doors or sashes. No.s 15 to 16 have turned wooden columns which once supported a porch roof with notable patching in to the brick wall. No. s21 to 22 there have a cast-iron framework with glazed roof and in-style support. Plain stucco band beneath pediments (four having stucco infill to lower corners). A stucco parapet wall has an alike coping or blocking course as to the (property) links. Paved flagstones dot the outdoors. The street-side, cast-iron railings have urn finials.
