= Garden square =

Communal garden surrounded by buildings

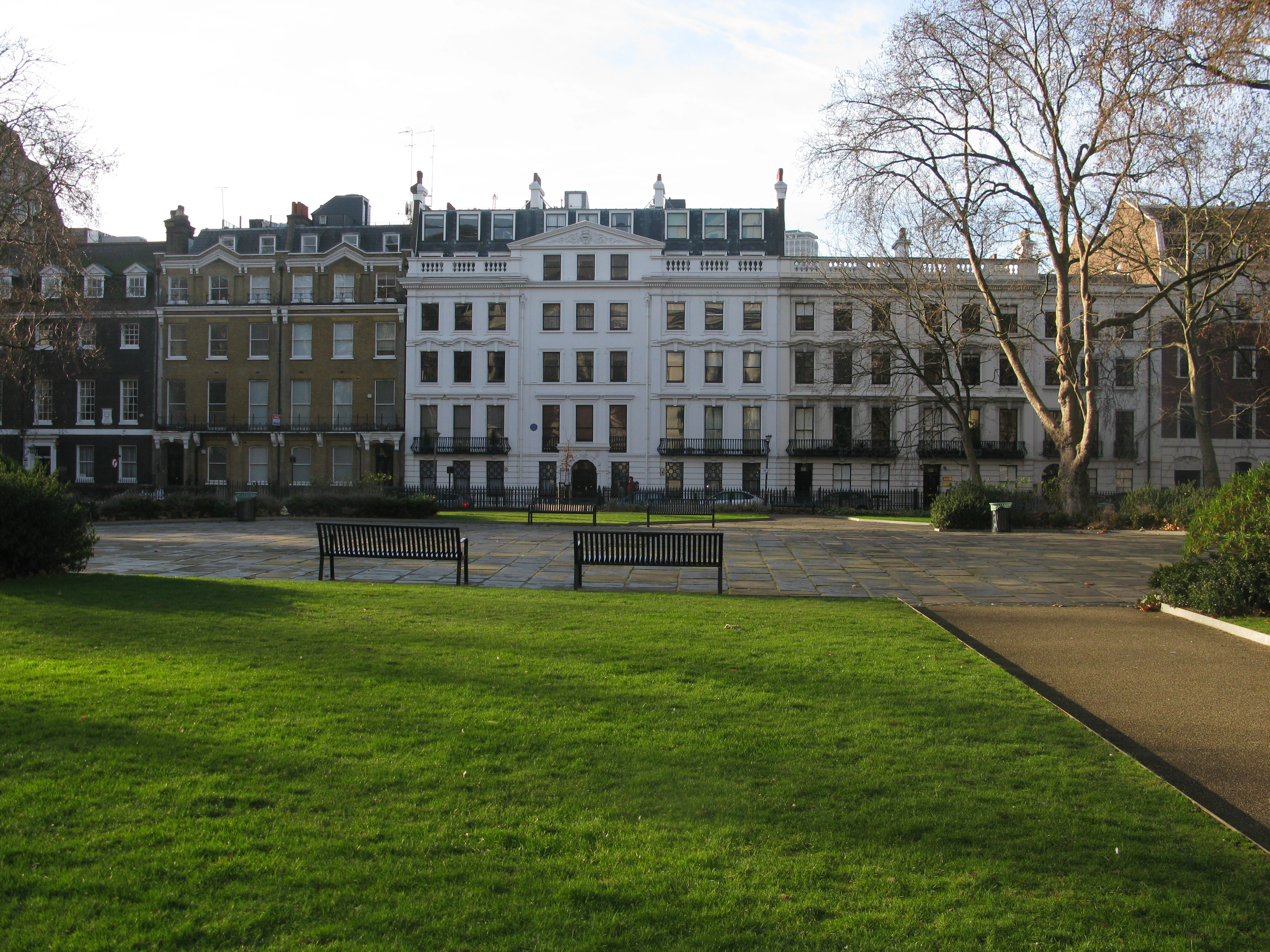
Bloomsbury Square, a garden square in central London, England

A garden square is a type of communal garden in an urban area wholly or substantially surrounded by buildings; commonly, it continues to be applied to public and private parks formed after such a garden becomes accessible to the public at large.

The archetypal garden square is surrounded by tall terraced houses and other types of townhouse. Because it is designed for the amenity of surrounding residents, it is subtly distinguished from a town square designed to be a public gathering place: due to its inherent private history, it may have a pattern of dedicated footpaths and tends to have considerably more plants than hard surfaces or large monuments.

== Propagation ==
At their conception in the early 17th century, each such garden was a private communal amenity for the residents of the overlooking houses akin to a garden courtyard within a palace or community. Such community courtyards date back to at least Ur in 2000 BC where two-storey houses were built of fired brick around an open square. Kitchen, living, working, and public spaces were located on the ground floor, with private rooms located upstairs.

In the 20th century, many garden squares that were previously accessible only to defined residents became accessible to the public. Those in central urban locations, such as Leicester Square in London's West End, have become indistinguishable from town squares. Others, while publicly accessible, are largely used by local residents and retain the character of garden squares or small communal parks. Many private squares, even in busy locations, remain private, such as Portman Square in Marylebone in London, despite its proximity to London's busiest shopping districts.

== Occurrence ==
=== Europe ===
==== United Kingdom ====
===== In London =====
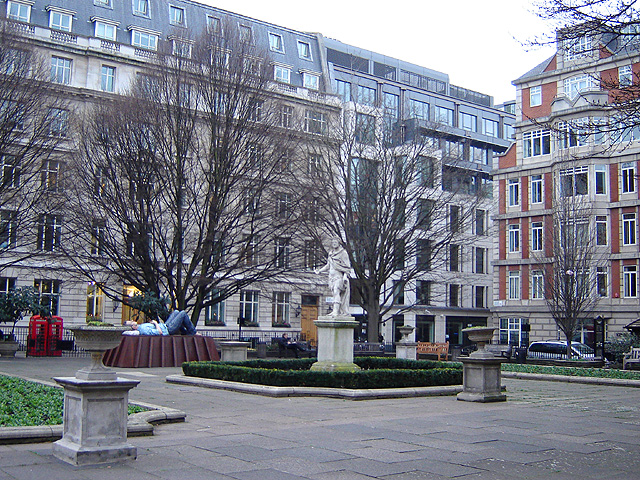
Golden Square, London

London is famous for garden squares; they are described as one of the glories of the capital. Many were built or rebuilt during the late eighteenth and early nineteenth centuries, at the height of Georgian architecture, and are surrounded by townhouses. In 1913, the UK Parliament passed the 1913 London Squares Preservation Act. The act provided enhanced legal protection to garden squares and other public spaces, ensuring they were preserved against inappropriate development and remained accessible for community enjoyment.

Large projects, such as the Bedford Estate, included garden squares in their development. The Notting Hill and Bloomsbury neighbourhoods both have many garden squares, with the former mostly still restricted to residents, and the latter open to all. Other UK cities prominent in the Georgian era such as Edinburgh, Bath, Bristol and Leeds have several garden squares.

Householders with access to a private garden square are commonly required to pay a maintenance levy. Normally the charge is set annually by a garden committee. Sometimes private garden squares are opened to the public, such as during Open Garden Squares Weekend.

==== France ====
===== In Paris =====
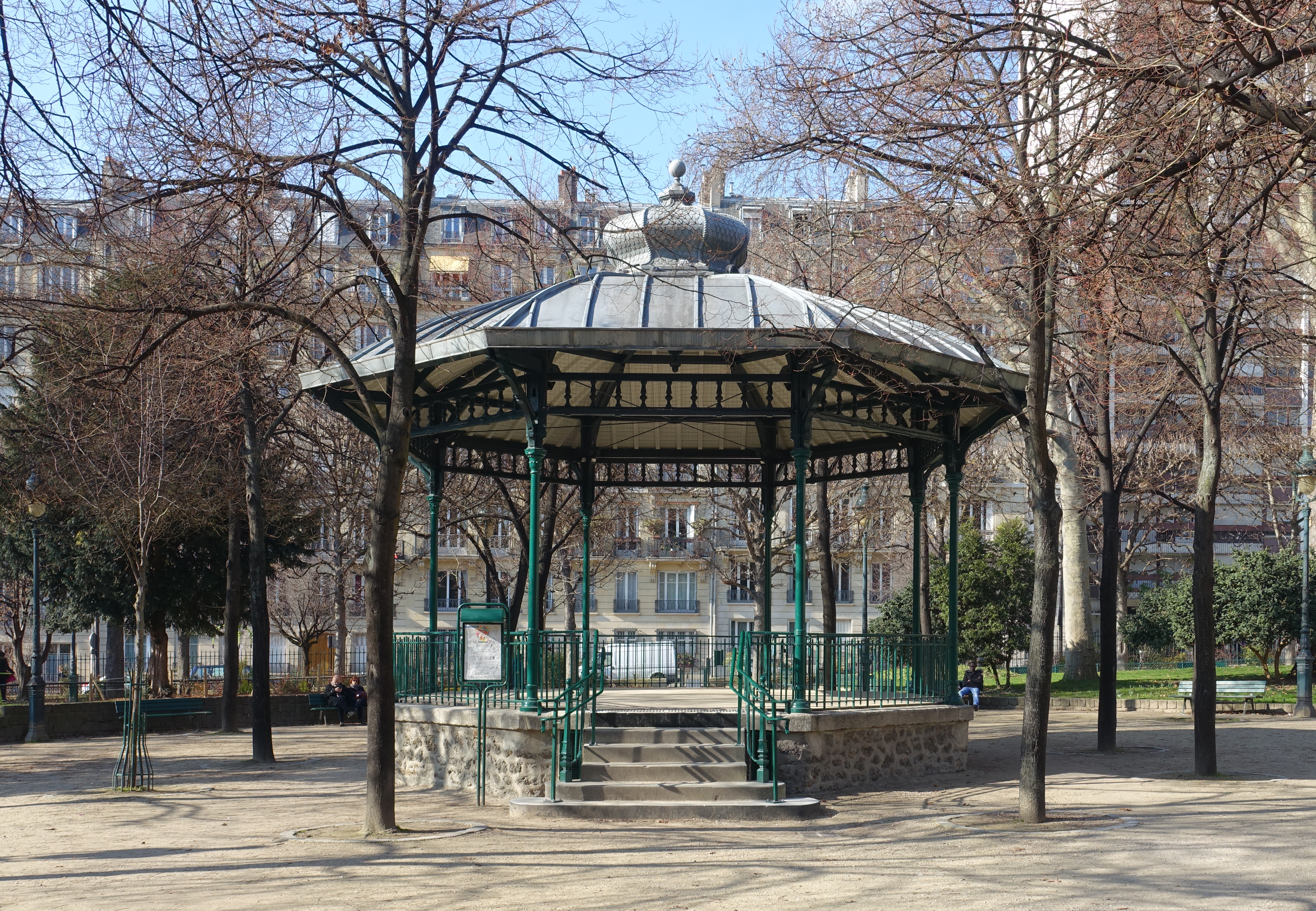
Square des Epinettes, Paris

Privately owned squares which survived the decades after the French Revolution and 19th century Haussmann's renovation of Paris include the Place des Vosges and Square des Épinettes in Paris. The Place des Vosges was a fashionable and expensive square to live in during the 17th and 18th centuries, and one of the central reasons that Le Marais district became so fashionable for French nobility. It was inaugurated in 1612 with a grand carrousel to celebrate the engagement of Louis XIII to Anne of Austria and is a prototype of the residential squares of European cities that were to come. What was new about the Place Royale as it was known in 1612 was that the house fronts were all built to the same design, probably by Baptiste du Cerceau.

In town squares, similarly green but publicly accessible from the outset, is the Square René Viviani. Gardens substantially cover a few of the famous Places in the capital; instead, the majority are paved and replete with profoundly hard materials such as Place de la Concorde. Inspired by ecological interests and a 21st-century focus on pollution mitigation, an increasing number of the Places in Paris today many have a focal tree or surrounding raised flower beds/and or rows of trees such as the Place de la République.

The enclosed garden terraces (French: jardins terrasses) and courtyards (French: cours) of some French former palaces have resulted in redevelopments into spaces equivalent to garden squares. The same former single-owner scenario applies to at least one garden square in London (Coleridge Square).

===== Outside of Paris =====
Grandiose instances of garden-use town squares are a part of many French cities, others opt for solid material town squares.

==== Belgium ====
The Square de Meeûs and Square Orban are notable examples in Brussels.

==== Ireland ====
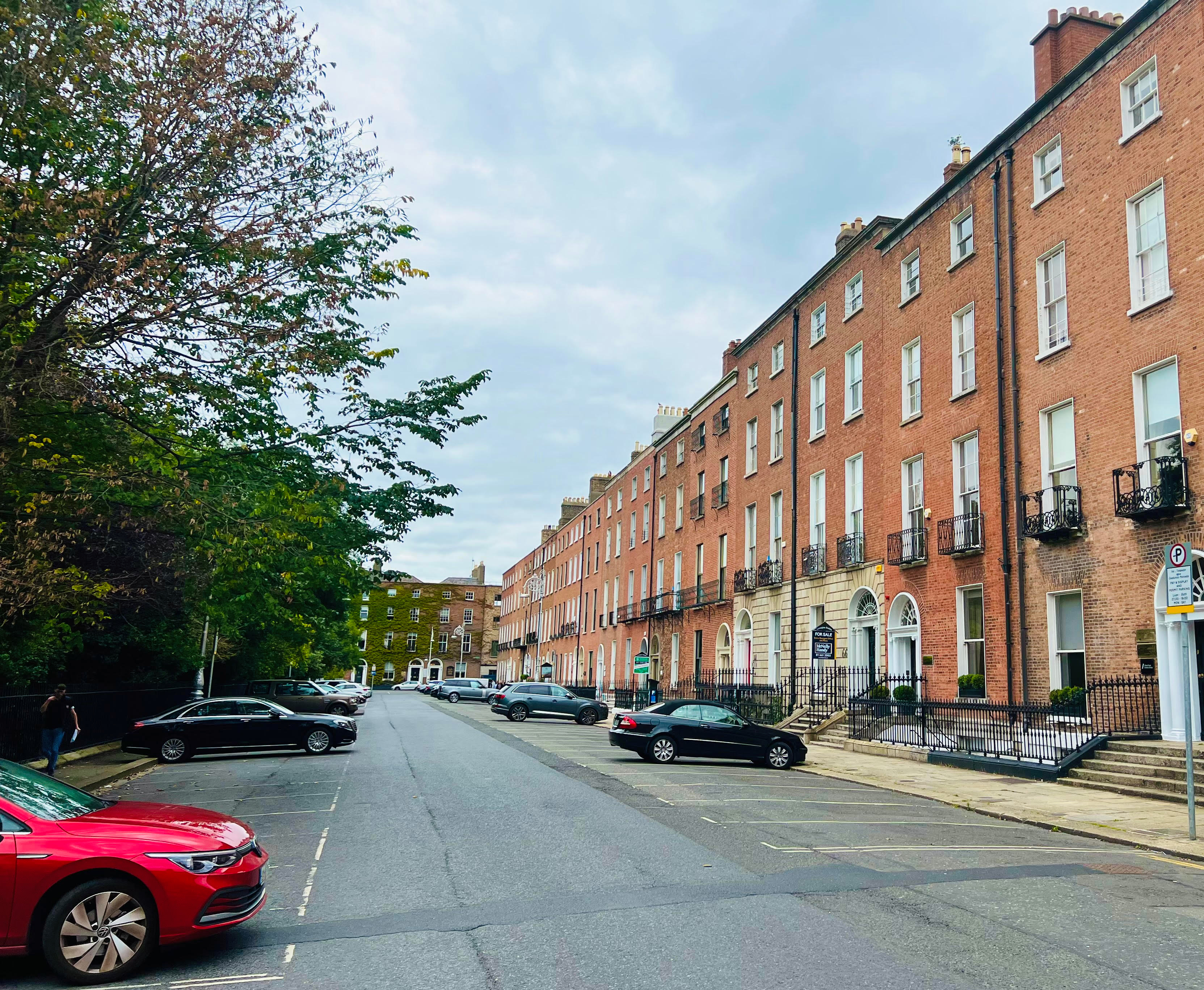
Fitzwilliam Square, Dublin

Dublin has several Georgian examples, including Merrion Square, Fitzwilliam Square, Mountjoy Square, St Stephens Green and Parnell Square.

=== The Americas ===
==== United States ====
Perhaps the most famous garden square in the United States is Gramercy Park in southern Midtown Manhattan. Famously, it has remained private and gated throughout its existence; possession of a key to the park is a jealously guarded privilege that only certain local residents enjoy.

The tradition of fee simple land ownership in American cities has made collective amenities such as garden squares comparatively rare. Very few sub-dividers and developers included them in plats during the 19th century, with notable exceptions below.

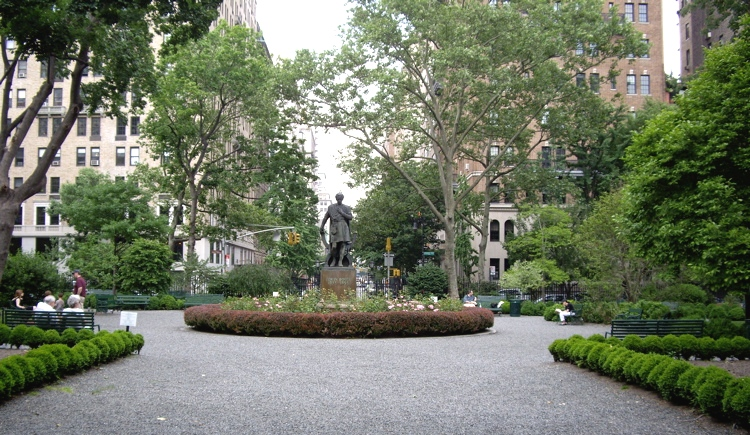
Gramercy Park, Manhattan

Rittenhouse Square in the Center City, Philadelphia encase a public garden, one of the five original open-space parks planned by William Penn and his surveyor Thomas Holme during the late 17th century. It was first named Southwest Square.

Nearby Fitler Square is a similar garden square named for late 19th century Philadelphia mayor Edwin Henry Fitler shortly after his death in 1896. The Square, cared for through a public private partnership between the Department of Parks and Recreation and the Fitler Square Improvement Association.

In Boston tens of squares exist, some having a mainly residential use.

The Kingstowne development in Fairfax County, Virginia, near Washington, DC, contains several townhouse complexes built around garden squares.

=== Africa ===
In Africa, garden squares are rare. Many squares and parks in Africa were constructed during colonial rule, along with European-styled architecture.

==== South Africa ====
A well-known square like this is Greenmarket Square, in the center of Cape Town, South Africa, which previously hosted more townhouses at its edges but has been mostly paved over.

=== Asia ===
Garden squares in Asia In Asia, garden squares are generally not referred to by that specific term, but the design concept of a central green space framed by surrounding structures or pathways is present in various forms. These spaces may take inspiration from traditional Chinese gardens, Japanese courtyard gardens, Mughal-style layouts, or British colonial town planning. They often include features such as symmetrical landscaping, paved walking paths, benches, water features, and flower beds.

==== China ====
People’s Park: Located on the former site of the Shanghai Race Club, People’s Park functions as a central urban green space surrounded by commercial and cultural buildings, aligning with the role of a garden square in the city.

Tiananmen Square green areas (Beijing): Although primarily known as a political space, Tiananmen Square includes landscaped areas with symmetrical design elements and floral arrangements that mimic formal garden layouts.

==== Japan ====
Hibiya Park (Tokyo): Established in 1903 as Japan’s first Western-style park, Hibiya Park includes formally arranged flower beds and fountains. It is enclosed by major government buildings and corporate offices, giving it the character of a civic garden square.

Kyoto Imperial Palace Gardens: While more expansive than a typical square, sections of the gardens are enclosed and geometrically laid out, resembling the characteristics of traditional garden squares.

==== South Korea ====
Seoul Plaza: An oval-shaped lawn in front of Seoul City Hall, Seoul Plaza is a central urban green space that accommodates civic gatherings, performances, and public events. Its design and usage align with the functions of a modern garden square.

Tapgol Park: A historic park in central Seoul, Tapgol Park is enclosed by walls and contains monuments and shaded walkways, serving as a quiet green space in an urban setting.

==== India ====
Lodhi Gardens (Delhi): Though not formally a garden square, Lodhi Gardens features symmetrical pathways and garden layouts surrounding historic tombs, creating a central green space within the city.

Connaught Place Inner Circle (New Delhi): Built during the British colonial era, Connaught Place features a circular commercial zone with a central park-like area, functioning similarly to a European garden square in terms of structure and social function.

==== Singapore ====
Raffles Place Green: This green space in the central business district is surrounded by high-rise buildings and is used for recreation and events, similar to a traditional garden square in Western cities.

Fort Canning Green: Located within Fort Canning Park, this lawn area is used for public gatherings and performances and is framed by historical structures, providing an enclosed garden setting.

== Australia and New Zealand ==
Australia

- St Vincent Gardens, Albert Park, Melbourne

New Zealand

- Trafalgar Square, Nelson
- Victory Square, Nelson

== See also ==
- Communal garden
- Private park
- Courtyard
- Urban open space
- Architecture of the United Kingdom
  - Parks and open spaces in London
  - List of garden squares in London
  - Squares in London
  - Terraced houses in the United Kingdom
  - Townhouse (Great Britain)
