= Frederick Daniel Parslow =

- Born: 14 January 1856; Islington, London
- Died: 4 July 1915 (aged 59); North Atlantic, off Ireland
- Burial place: Cobh Old Church Cemetery, County Cork
- Military career
- Allegiance: United Kingdom
- Branch: (United Kingdom) Royal Naval Reserve (United Kingdom) Merchant Navy
- Rank: Merchant Navy: Master; Royal Navy: Lieutenant
- Commands: HMHT Anglo-Californian
- Conflicts: World War I †
- Awards: Victoria Cross

Frederick Daniel Parslow VC (14 January 1856 – 4 July 1915) was an English recipient of the Victoria Cross. He was a Master in the UK Merchant Navy.

Parslow was the first member of the Merchant Navy to receive a VC, and one of only two Merchant Navy members to receive a VC for his First World War service. At 59 years old he was also the oldest person to receive the VC for his action in World War I.

== Details ==
At 0900 hrs 4 July 1915 in the Atlantic Ocean southwest of Queenstown, Ireland, the U-boat SM U-39 attacked HM Horse Transport Anglo-Californian, a 7,333 GRT cargo steamship that the UK Government had requisitioned from the Nitrate Producers Steam Ship Company. Parslow was Anglo-Californian's Master, and kept ordering changes of course to evade the enemy fire. At 1030 hrs U-39 raised the flag signal "abandon the vessel as fast as possible".

Parslow was about to obey the order when his wireless operator received a signal from a Royal Navy destroyer to hold on as long as possible. Anglo-Californian got under way again, so U-39 opened a heavy fire, concentrated on the transport ship's bridge, and doing great damage. Captain Parslow remained on the bridge throughout the attack, entirely without protection and was killed when the bridge was wrecked.

Parslow's son, also Frederick Parslow, was the Chief Officer and took command on the death of his father. He held out until two destroyers arrived to drive the submarine away. Anglo-Californian suffered 20 casualties, but most of the cargo of nearly a thousand military horses was saved. The younger Parslow was commissioned as a Sub-Lieutenant in the Royal Naval Reserve, and was awarded the Distinguished Service Cross.

As a merchant officer, Parslow was not eligible for the VC in 1915. However, later the Royal Navy posthumously commissioned Parslow as a Lieutenant in the Royal Naval Reserve, and in May 1919 he was posthumously awarded the VC.

Parslow lived in Balls Pond Road, Islington. On 4 July 2015 the London Borough of Islington commemorated the centenary of Parslow's action and death by installing an inscribed memorial paving stone next to Islington Green War Memorial.

== Bibliography ==
- Anonymous (1997). The Register of the Victoria Cross (revised ed.). This England.
- Harvey, David (1999). Monuments to Courage: Victoria Cross Headstones and Memorials. Vol. 1, 1854–1916. Kevin & Kay Patience. OCLC 59437297.
- Snelling, Stephen (2002). VCs of the First World War. Vol. The Naval VCs. Stroud: The History Press.
