= Upper Street =

Main road in Islington, London

Coordinates: 51°32′25″N 0°6′9″W

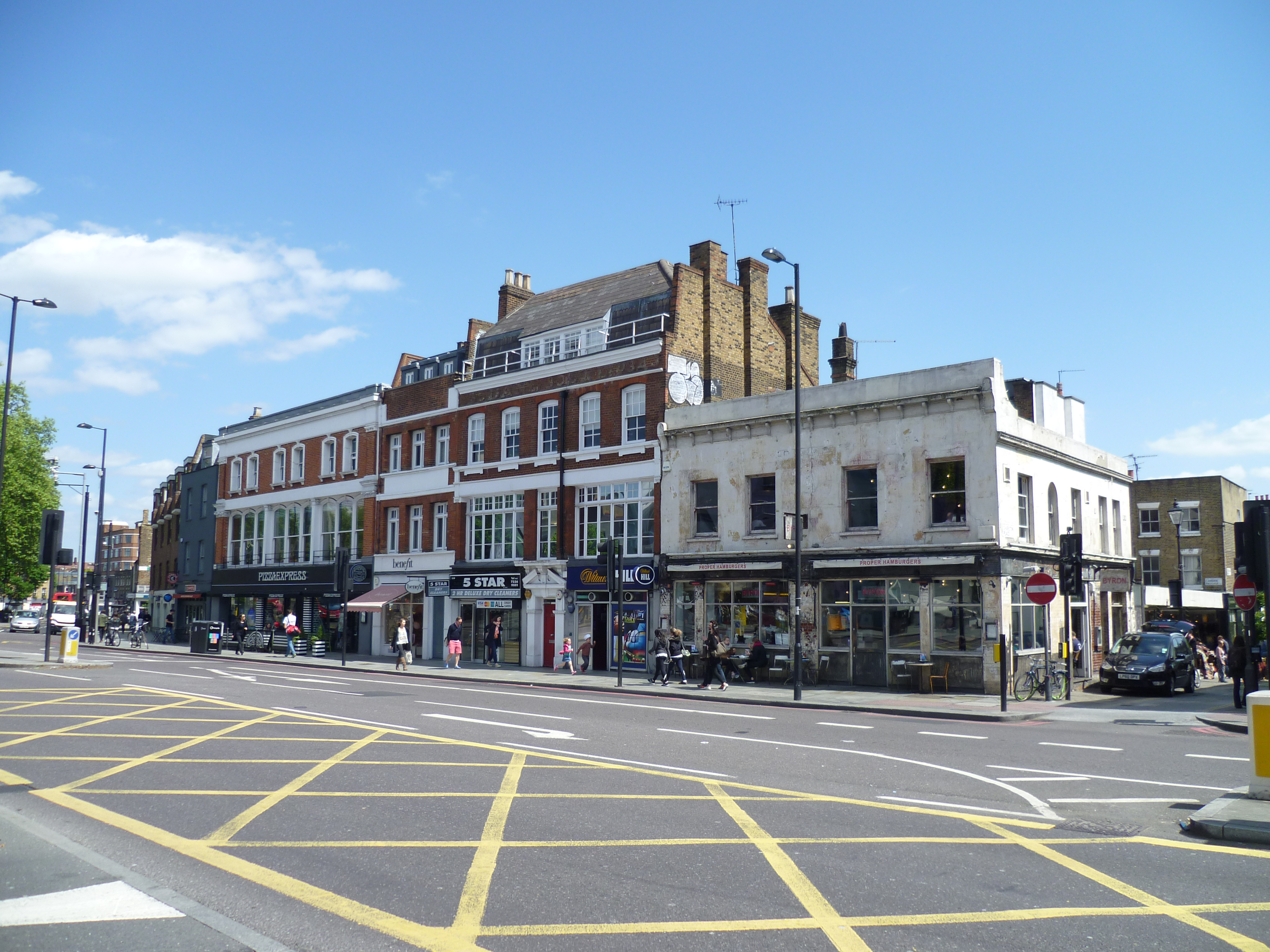
Upper Street, just south of the junction with Essex Road at Islington Green

Upper Street is the main street of the Islington district of inner north London, and carries the A1 road. It begins at the junction of the A1 and Liverpool Road, continuing on from Islington High Street which runs from the crossroads at Pentonville Road and City Road and runs roughly northwards from outside the main entrance to Angel Underground station, then past the Business Design Centre, then splits at Islington Green (where Essex Road, formerly named Lower Street, branches off), then past The Screen On The Green cinema, past Islington Town Hall, ending at Highbury & Islington tube station on Highbury Corner, where the A1 carries on as Holloway Road, part of the Great North Road.

Upper Street contains many fashionable shops, pubs, restaurants and theatres, concentrated on the west side of the street, while the east side has several notable churches and chapels.

== History ==
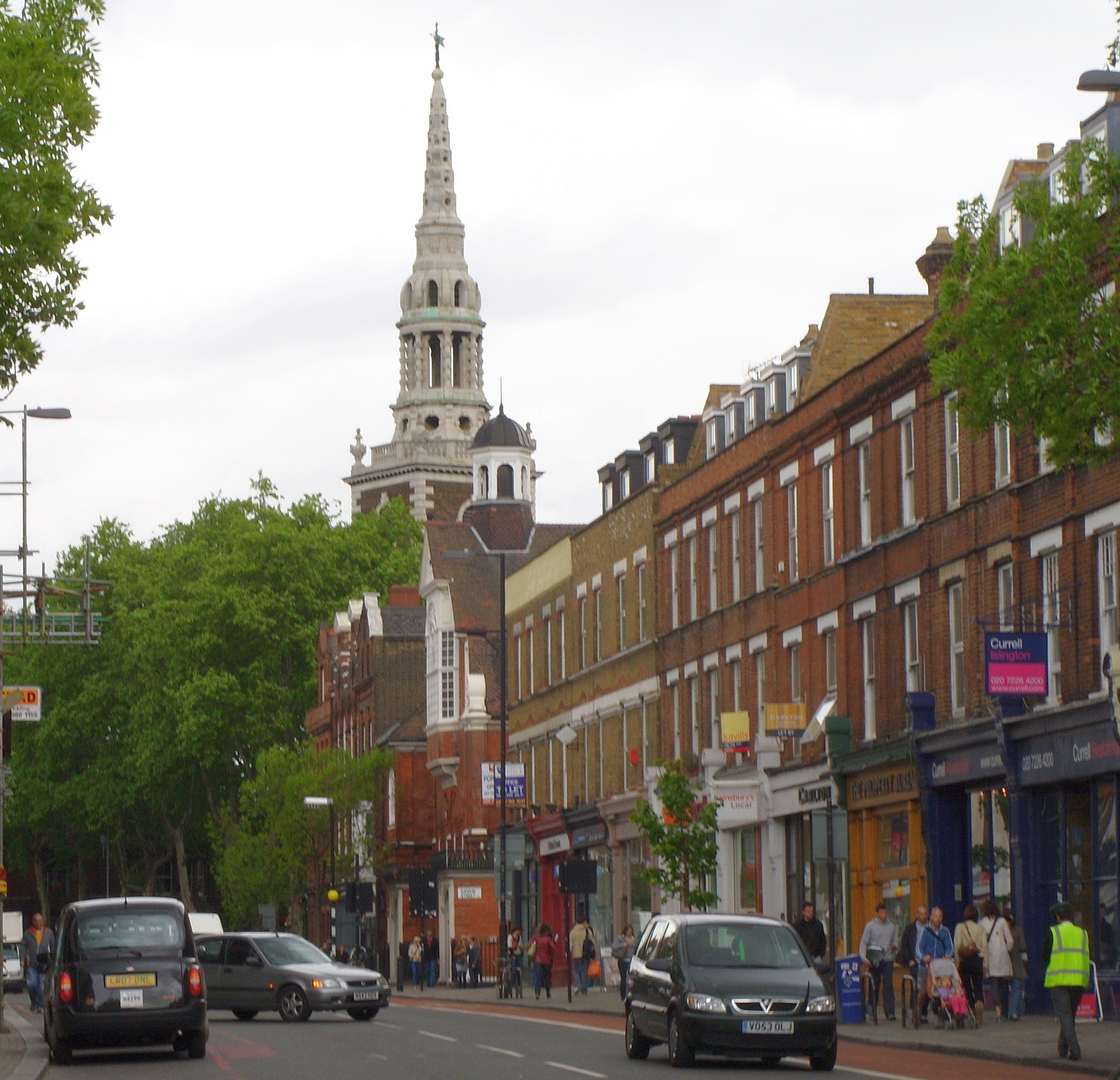
Upper Street, with the spire of St Mary's Church

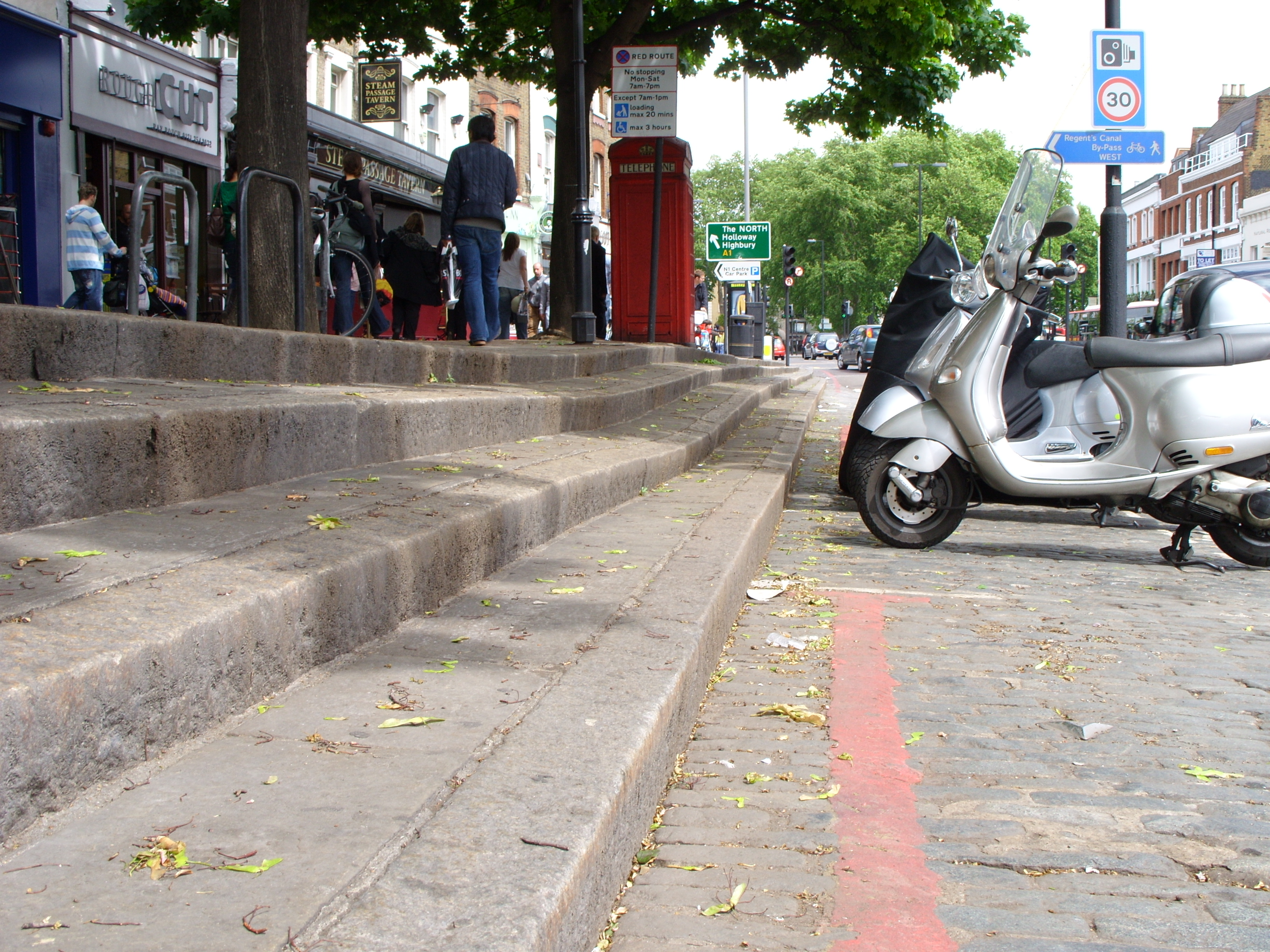
High pavement, Upper Street

=== Origins ===
The hilltop village of Islington originally consisted of two streets in addition to the High Street: Upper Street and Lower Street, which diverged from the High Street at Islington Green. Both date back to at least the 12th century. Near the Green is the parish church, St Mary's. Henry VIII hunted duck in the ponds off Upper Street, while Walter Raleigh lived in Upper Street and owned a pub in Lower Street. Lower Street has since been renamed Essex Road.

The fields around Upper Street, with their close proximity to the growing city of London, were a major farming area, mostly for dairying and market gardens. The street itself served as part of the drovers' road, channelling livestock from the Midlands and North of England towards Smithfield Market in the City of London.

From the end of the 16th century, there was a significant inn at the bottom of what is now Islington High Street. It was known as the Angel by 1614 and lends its name to that area. The 1837 Charles Dickens novel Oliver Twist states that the Angel is where "London began in earnest".

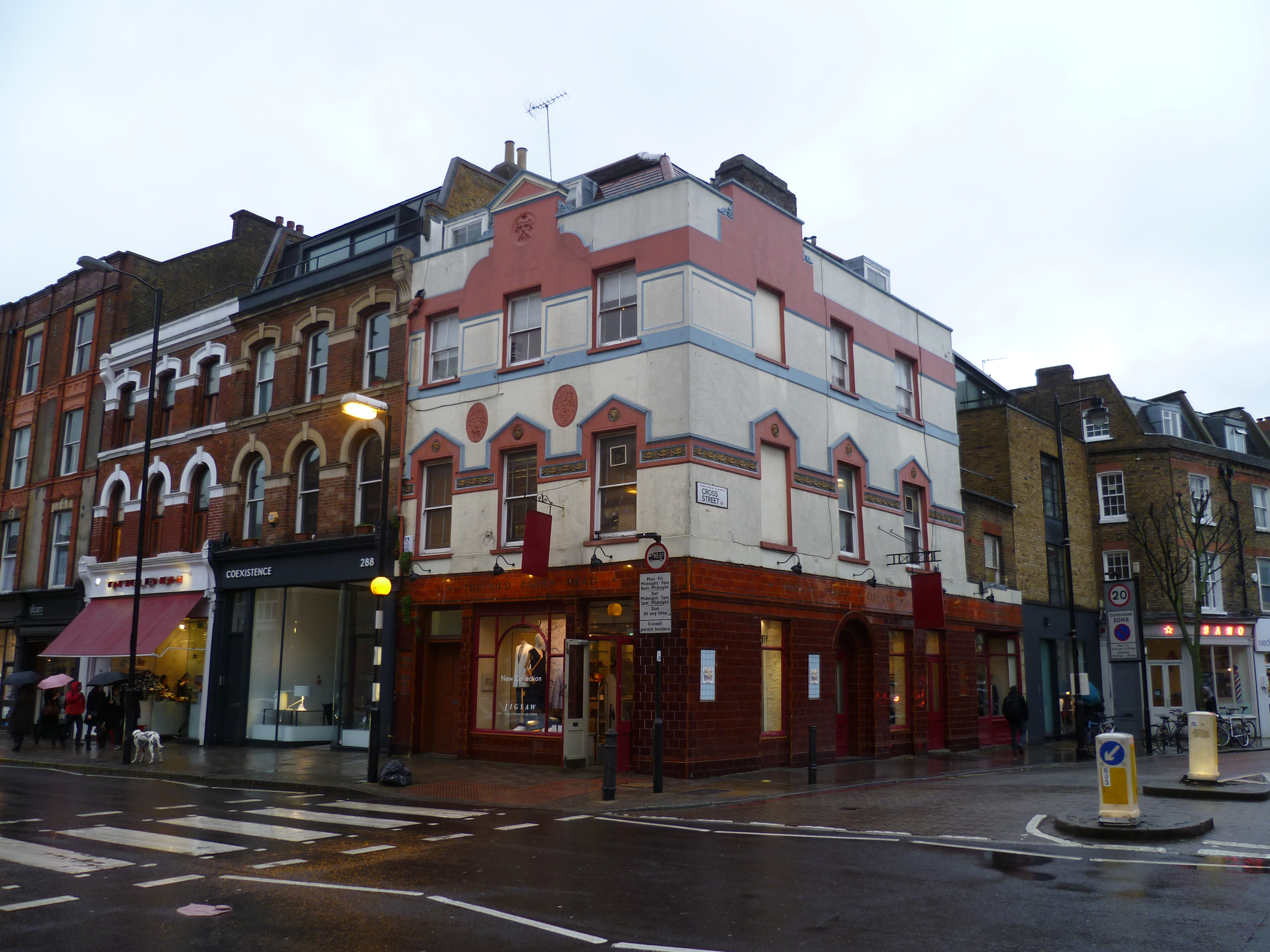
The former Old Parr's Head pub in Upper Street

In the 18th century Upper Street began to be redeveloped from an agricultural to a residential area. Ten houses were built in 1768 (later named Hornsey Row), and a further group built immediately south of Hornsey Row in 1792. A William Beverley (identified with William Roxby Beverley), the first to solve the problem of a "magic knight's tour" in chess (a variant on the knight's tour in which the numbered steps form a magic square) resided in these buildings, now replaced by Islington Town Hall.

=== Victorian era ===
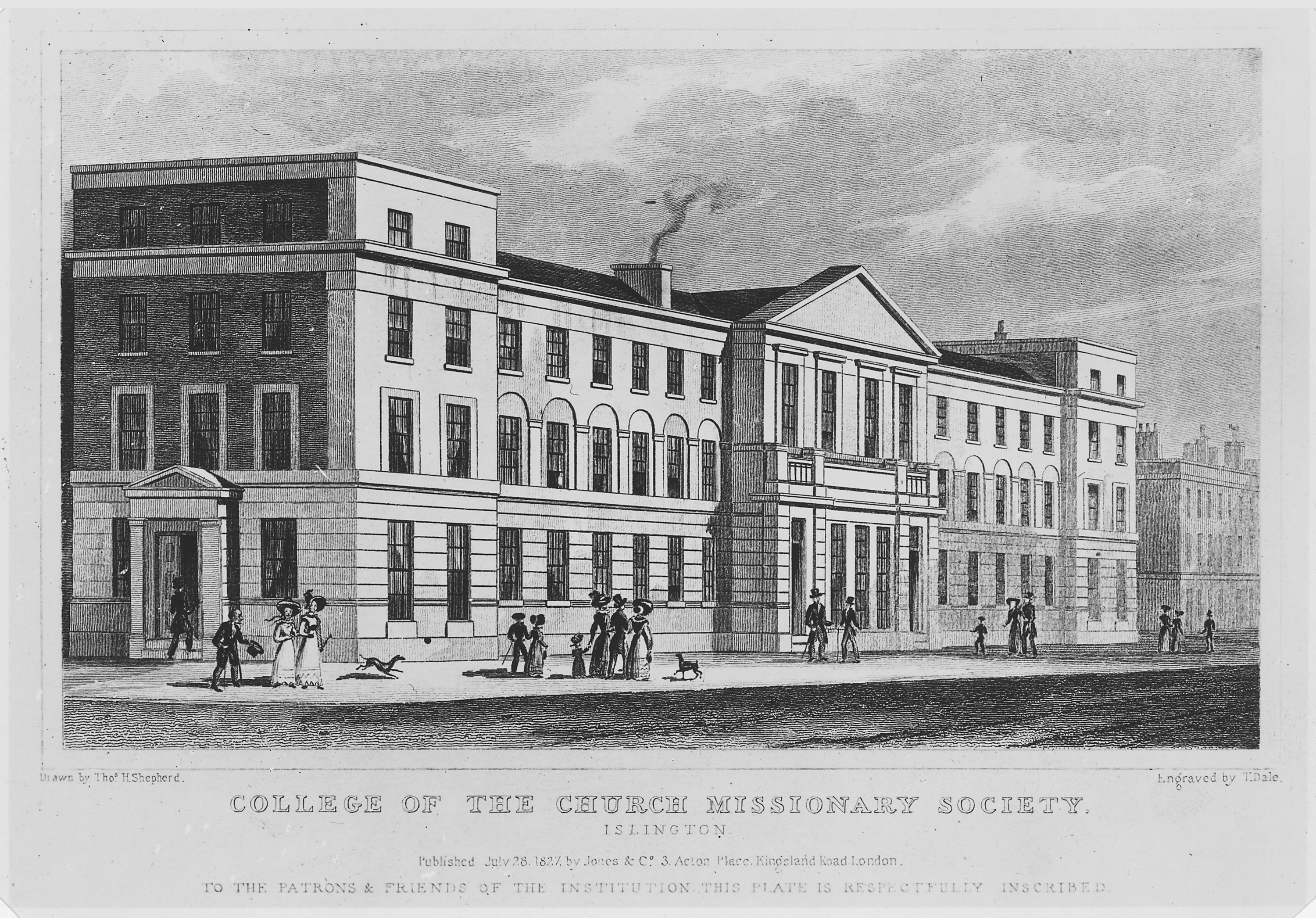
College of the Church Missionary Society, Islington

By 1825 the Church Missionary Society Training College had moved to Upper Street. The impressive purpose-built construction provided classrooms and living accommodation for prospective Anglican missionaries and a professional staff. The new premises was designed to teach around 20 students to pass bishops' ordination examinations, tutoring them in Latin, Greek, English composition, sermon writing, and Divinity.

In 1837, the year of Queen Victoria's accession, Islington residents decided to create their own "lit & phil". The Islington Literary and Scientific Society included a library, reading room, museum, laboratory, and a lecture theatre seating 500. The architects were the fashionable partnership of Robert Lewis Roumieu and Alexander Dick Gough. The library was sold off in 1872 and the building was disposed of in 1874, running through various owners and purposes over the following century, before becoming the home of the Almeida Theatre in the 1970s.

In 1860 a Unitarian congregation moved out of the City (from Carter Lane near St Paul's Cathedral) and built a large church in the Dissenting Gothic style on Upper Street. Half a century later its official history recalls:

The district at this time, 1860, still retained somewhat of its rural character; tall elm trees flanked the Upper Street, between the Green and the High Street, at the end of Liverpool Road, where the turnpike still left its traces; in many of the cottages parlours had been converted into shops. A terrace of old houses, upon a raised pavement, reached by some steps, stood between Cross Street and a nursery ground, and beyond this were the Police Station and the Vestry Hall to the north.

The spire and building were badly damaged in the Blitz, and demolished. Islingon Council purchased the land fronting onto Upper Street and built a fire station. Tucked away behind this, though still with an entry fronting onto the main street, is the 1950s rebuilding.

By the mid 19th century, the growth of London necessitated a bigger venue for agricultural and other shows. In 1862, a group of businessmen associated with the Smithfield Show opened the Royal Agricultural Hall on a large plot between Upper Street and Liverpool Road immediately to the west. Unusually for London, both roads were rebuilt with a high pavement - up to 1 m above the road surface for some of their length - to protect pedestrians from being splashed with mud and ordure created by the large numbers of animals walking along the drover's road to the hall. A number of pubs and shops existed along Upper Street to serve farmers and visitors to the hall. In the 1980s the exhibition venue was revamped as the Business Design Centre.

In the late nineteenth century, the Upper Street area became notorious for its night-time entertainments. In 1870, Charles Dickens described the area as "amongst the noisiest and most disagreeable thoroughfares in London." and in 1885, it was widely known as "The Devil's Mile" on account of its prostitution, crime and the level of drunkenness.

=== 20th century ===
Between 1936 and 1939, the former Methodist chapel in Providence Place, just off Upper Street, was the home of a drama school, the London Theatre Studio, directed by Michel Saint-Denis, with a conversion of the building designed by Marcel Breuer and F. R. S. Yorke. The students taught there included Peter Ustinov.

== Places of interest ==
In recent years Upper Street has become extremely fashionable, and contains numerous pubs and restaurants, The pubs along the street are also popular meeting places for supporters going to the nearby Emirates Stadium, home of Arsenal Football Club.

Starting from the south, the first significant venue is a former tram shed, built in 1850 for commuter service to the City. By the 1940s the service had ceased, and the building was converted to an electricity substation, which was then closed by the 1970s. Following some years of lying derelict, it was reopened on 14 November 1979 as The Mall Antiques Arcade, and at its height housed over 35 dealers on its ground and lower ground floors. The building also housed other businesses, such as a restaurant in its upper floors, but the mall closed in 2008. Since 2013, the building has housed several chain shops. It is currently an Amazon Fresh store. The closure of the arcade reflects the reduction in the number of antique traders in the nearby Camden Passage, though a weekend antiques market is still held there. Moving north, there is the Business Design Centre, mentioned above as the Royal Agricultural Hall.

Islington Green is a small, triangular public park containing an artistically distinctive war memorial. At this point Upper Street splits, continuing north and northwest as a narrower street while Essex Road (formerly Lower Street) continues northeast. North of Islington Green, places of interest include the former Islington Chapel, now Angel Recording Studios and the Church of England parish church. St. Mary's was rebuilt in 1754 and its spire dominates the Islington skyline. The church is a major venue for performances of traditional religious music.

The Little Angel Theatre is a children's puppet theatre in a former Temperance hall, behind the church. Directly opposite the church is the King's Head Theatre, founded in 1970 as the first pub theatre in the UK. The Almeida Theatre is an important independent theatre and producing house. The former Islington post office is now the entrance to the large scale mixed-use development "Islington Square", centred around a converted Royal Mail sorting office.

Further north is Islington Town Hall, where the joint first legal same-sex marriage in England took place on 29 March 2014. Adjacent to the town hall is Islington Museum.

Upper Street also contains the Hope and Anchor, one of the most important venues of the 1970s and 1980s punk and new wave scenes. The Stranglers' album Live at the Hope and Anchor was recorded here. The building is still in use as a music venue today. Further north, the eastern side of Upper Street is taken up by a long but narrow garden, Compton Terrace Gardens. Accessed from Upper Street through these gardens is Union Chapel, a working Congregational church, live-entertainment venue and charity drop-in centre for the homeless. Built in the late 19th century in the Gothic Revival style, the church is a Grade I-listed building.

== The radical left ==
In the 1970s and 1980s Upper Street was a focal point of the radical left. It was home to Sisterwrite, Britain's first feminist bookshop, as well as the Trotskyist Pioneer Books, the anarchist Rising Free shop (famous for stealing stock from other shops to sell in theirs) and the socialist Red Books. In the 1980s, Upper Street was home to the Islington Action Group for the Unwaged, a major far left campaigning and activist group, and to the squatter-run Molly's Cafe, a focal point for the anarchist and squatting movement. Upper Street made headlines on 23 July 1995, when the Reclaim the Streets movement took over the street, barricaded it to traffic and held a long party in the street.

== Cultural references ==
Upper Street was one of the settings for local resident Douglas Adams's The Hitchhiker's Guide to the Galaxy series. The London-based sections of the later books are set in and around Upper Street, the home address of "Fenchurch". In addition, the character of Hotblack Desiato is named after a local estate agent.
