= Essex Road =

Street in the London Borough of Islington

Coordinates: 51.5426°N 0.0959°W

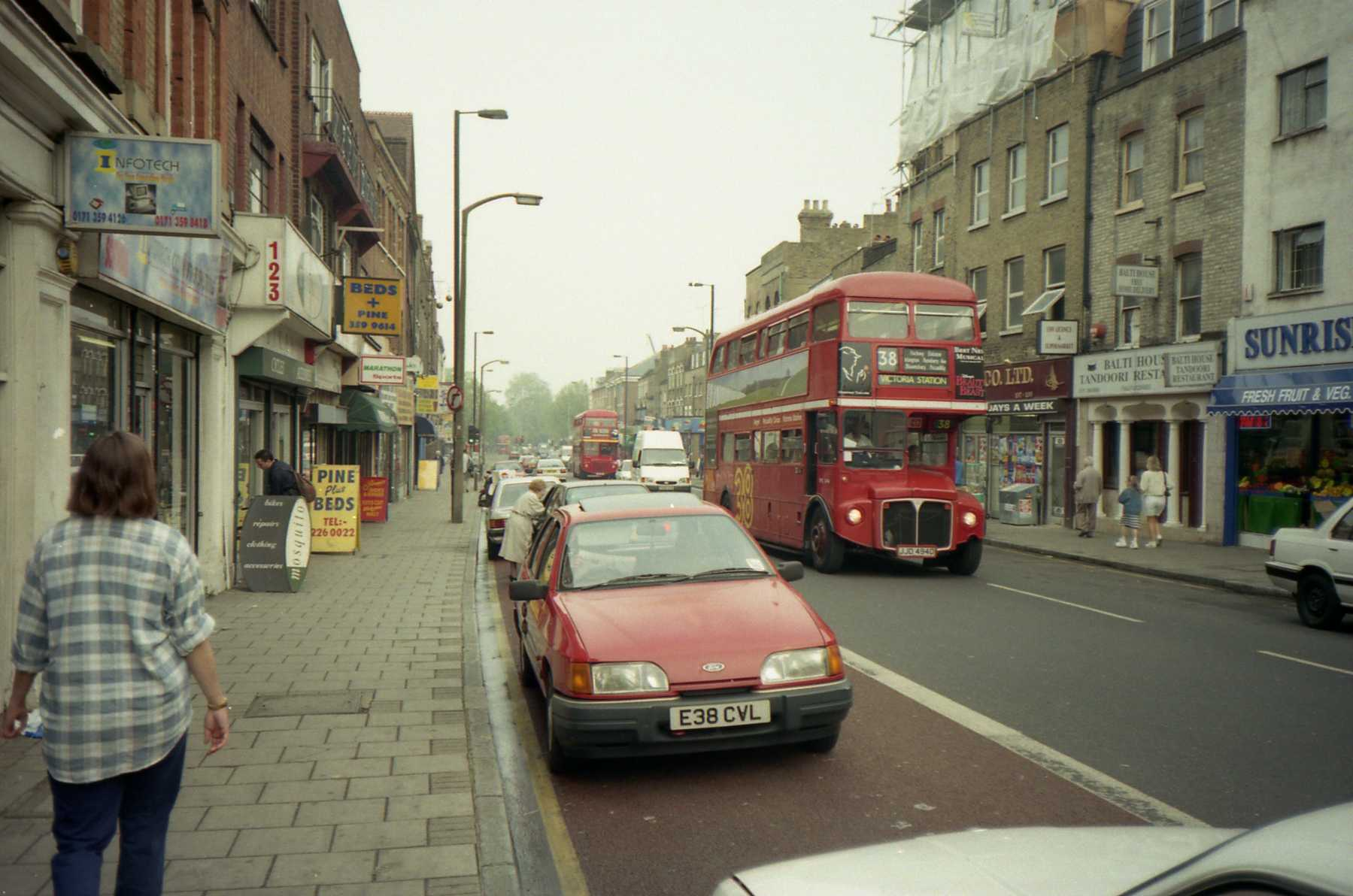
Essex Road in 1998

Essex Road is a main road in Islington, London. It is part of the A104 and connects Islington High Street with Balls Pond Road via Essex Road railway station.

== Location ==
The road is about 1 mile (1.6 km) long. It starts as continuation of Islington Green, which is a fork from Islington High Street, and runs northeastwards over New North Road towards Balls Pond Road. It is part of the A104, a main local road across northeast London.

== History ==
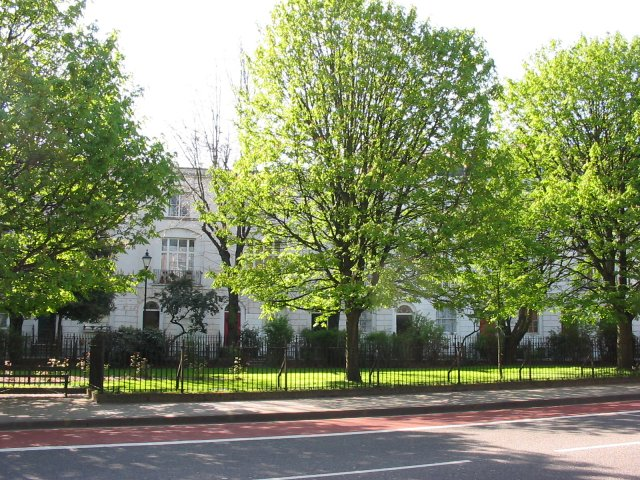
Town houses on Essex Road

The northern section of the road was once called Seveney Street, possibility indicating a Roman connection. The southern section was called Lower Street, as it was a lower ground level than Upper Street. Many properties along the road were constructed in the 18th and early 19th centuries. Most of these are still standing, though the various inns alongside them have been redeveloped.

Islington Market was founded in 1836 by John Perkins on a 15 acres (6.1 ha) site to the east of Essex Road and north of what is now Northchurch Road. It was not successful, and the site lay derelict for some years. After the Caledonian Market was established elsewhere in Islington, the old market area was laid out with new streets.

The New River crossed Essex Road where it met Colebrooke Row in a 45 metres (148 ft) tunnel. The river was piped in 1861.

== Properties ==
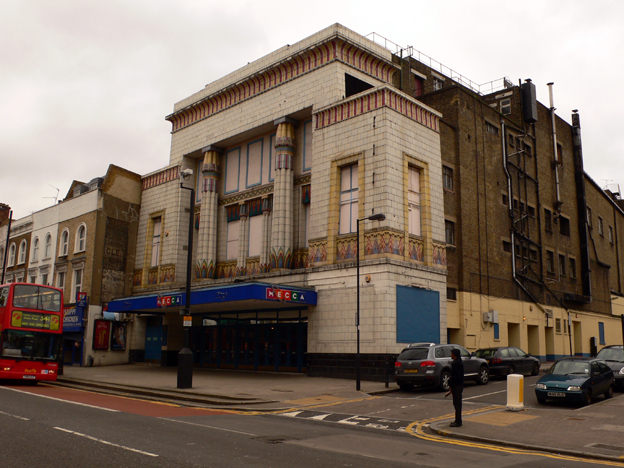
Former Carlton Cinema in 2007, as a Mecca Bingo hall

Fisher House stood at the junction of Essex Road and Cross Street. It was constructed in the 17th century as a residential mansion. It later became an asylum before being demolished in 1845.

The Old Queen's Head, a pub, contains a plaster ceiling and chimneypiece constructed in the 16th century.

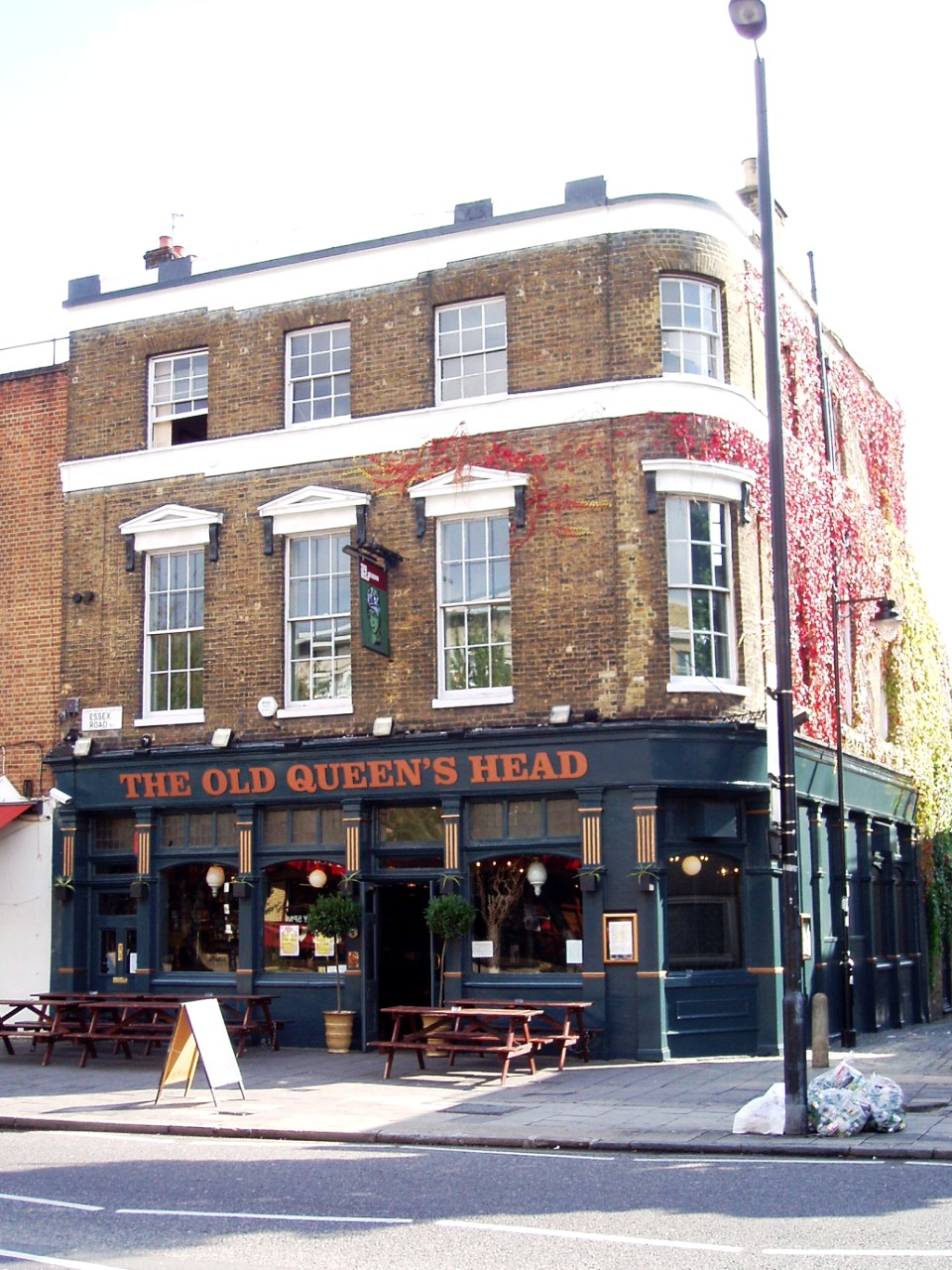
Old Queen's Head

The Lower Street Meeting House was founded in 1744 at what is now the junction of Essex Road and Greenman Street. It was the first Dissenter chapel to be constructed in Islington. It subsequently became The Green Man, a pub.

Samuel Ridley's floorcloth factory was built in 1812 on what was open fields around the north end of Essex Road. It became Probyn's bottling factory in 1893, and was later redeveloped as council offices in the 1970s.

The South Library is on the corner of Essex Road and Cross Street. It was constructed in 1916 in a Queen Anne style.

The Carlton Cinema was at Nos. 161-169. It was built in 1930 in an art deco style by George Coles, using an Egyptian style facade. It was subsequently used as a bingo hall, and then a place of worship. The building is Grade II* listed.

== Transport ==
Essex Road railway station is halfway along the road. It opened on 14 February 1904 as part of the Great Northern & City Railway from Moorgate to Finsbury Park. Services are operated by Great Northern.
