= John Thomas (sculptor) =

English sculptor and architect

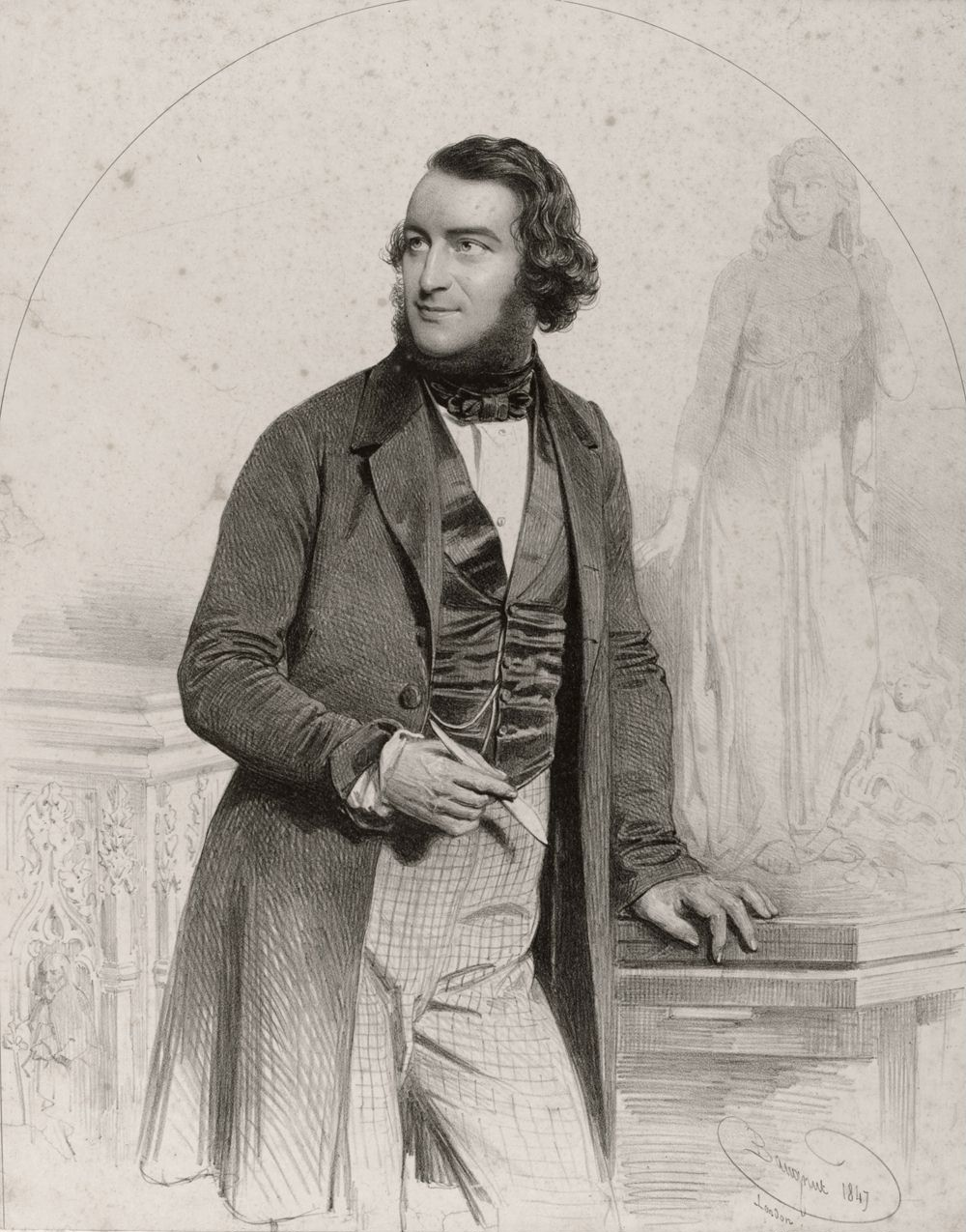
- John Thomas in 1847, aged 34
- Born: 1813
- Died: 9 April 1862 (aged 48–49); London
- Occupation: Sculptor, artist

John Thomas (1813–1862) was a British sculptor and architect, who worked on Buckingham Palace and the Palace of Westminster.

== Life ==
John Thomas was born in Chalford, Gloucestershire. Apprenticed to a stonemason after being left an orphan, he later went to Birmingham where his elder brother William was an architect (and who later moved to Canada to continue his career). He was noticed by Charles Barry who immediately employed John Thomas as a stone and wood carver on Birmingham Grammar School (now demolished), his first collaboration with Augustus Welby Northmore Pugin. Barry later appointed him the Superintendent of Stone Carving at the Palace of Westminster in London, in which role he was responsible for supplying sixty statues of English kings and queens, including those in the niches of the Central Lobby of the Palace.

== Works ==
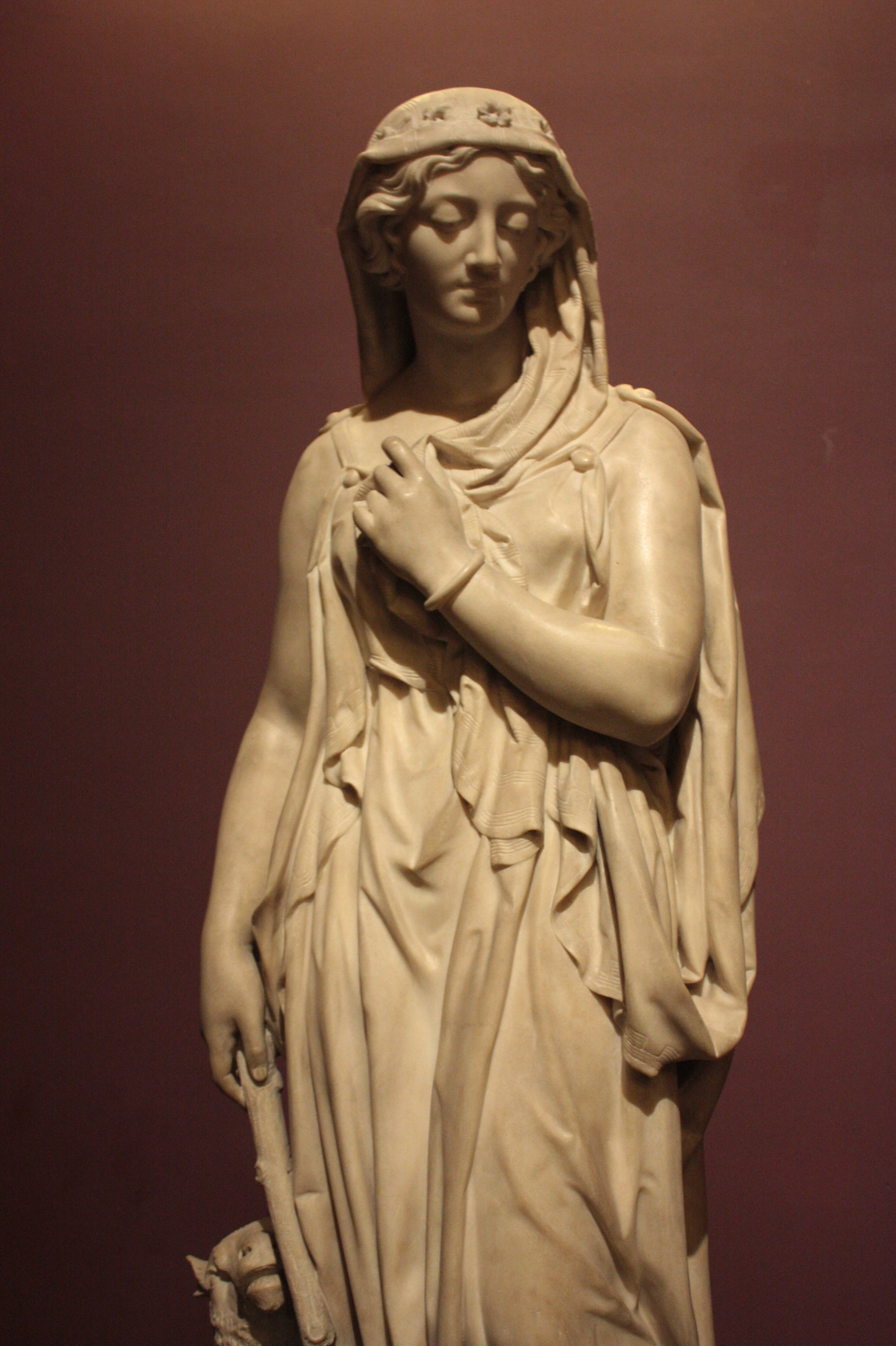
Rachel by John Thomas, 1856, Victoria and Albert Museum

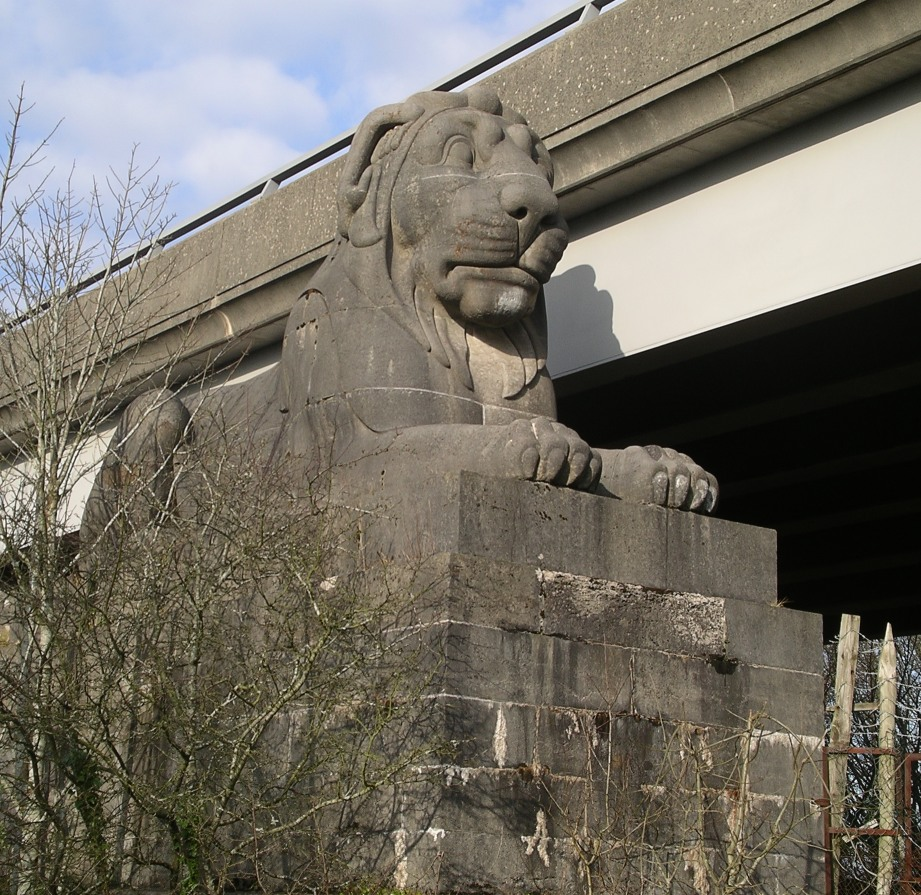
One of four Lions sculpted by John Thomas that stand at each corner of the Britannia Bridge crossing the Menai Strait

Thomas's work 'Charity' was shown at the Great Exhibition of 1851, and then adapted to form a memorial in Christ Church, Chalford, to his brother Richard who died in 1852. His final work was the colossal statue of William Shakespeare displayed at the 1862 International Exhibition. A dispute over its placement hastened his death in April 1862, and he was buried in Kensal Green Cemetery, London. His massive (30 ft. high and 40 ft (12 m). in diameter) majolica fountain, also on display at the 1862 exhibition, was placed outside the V&A Museum of Childhood until it was demolished in 1926.

=== Other works ===
- Twelve large dragons ornamenting ceilings of two grand saloons at Brighton Pavilion, made for the grand re-opening, 1851.
- A replica of the Bristol High Cross, which was erected in 1851.
- Eight allegorical statues at the 1847 Euston railway station representing the cities served by the line: London, Liverpool, Manchester, etc.
- Statue of Hugh Myddelton at Islington Green, London.
- Statue of Godiva, held in Maidstone Museum & Art Gallery
- The Atlas Fountain at Castle Howard
- Four British lions at each corner of the Britannia Bridge crossing the Menai Strait between the island of Anglesey and the mainland of Wales
- extensive friezes and spandrel figures for the Lloyds Bank, Bristol
- Carving and statues on Halifax Town Hall, created c. 1860 – 1862 in collaboration with Edward Middleton Barry to design of Charles Barry. Thomas carved three statues for the tower, but died before completing the fourth, which was overseen by another artist to his design.
- Life-sized plaster maquette (at Canterbury Heritage Museum as of 2013) and bronze (permanently at House of Lords) of Stephen Langton. One of 17 maquettes for 17 bronzes depicting those present at the signing of Magna Carta.
- Boadicea 1855 Y Gaer
- Joseph Sturge memorial, Birmingham (Erected after Thomas' death)
- Tympanum above main door of Leeds Town Hall

=== Works as an architect ===
- Headington Hill Hall
- Somerleyton Hall
- Brandon railway station (1845)

== Picture gallery ==
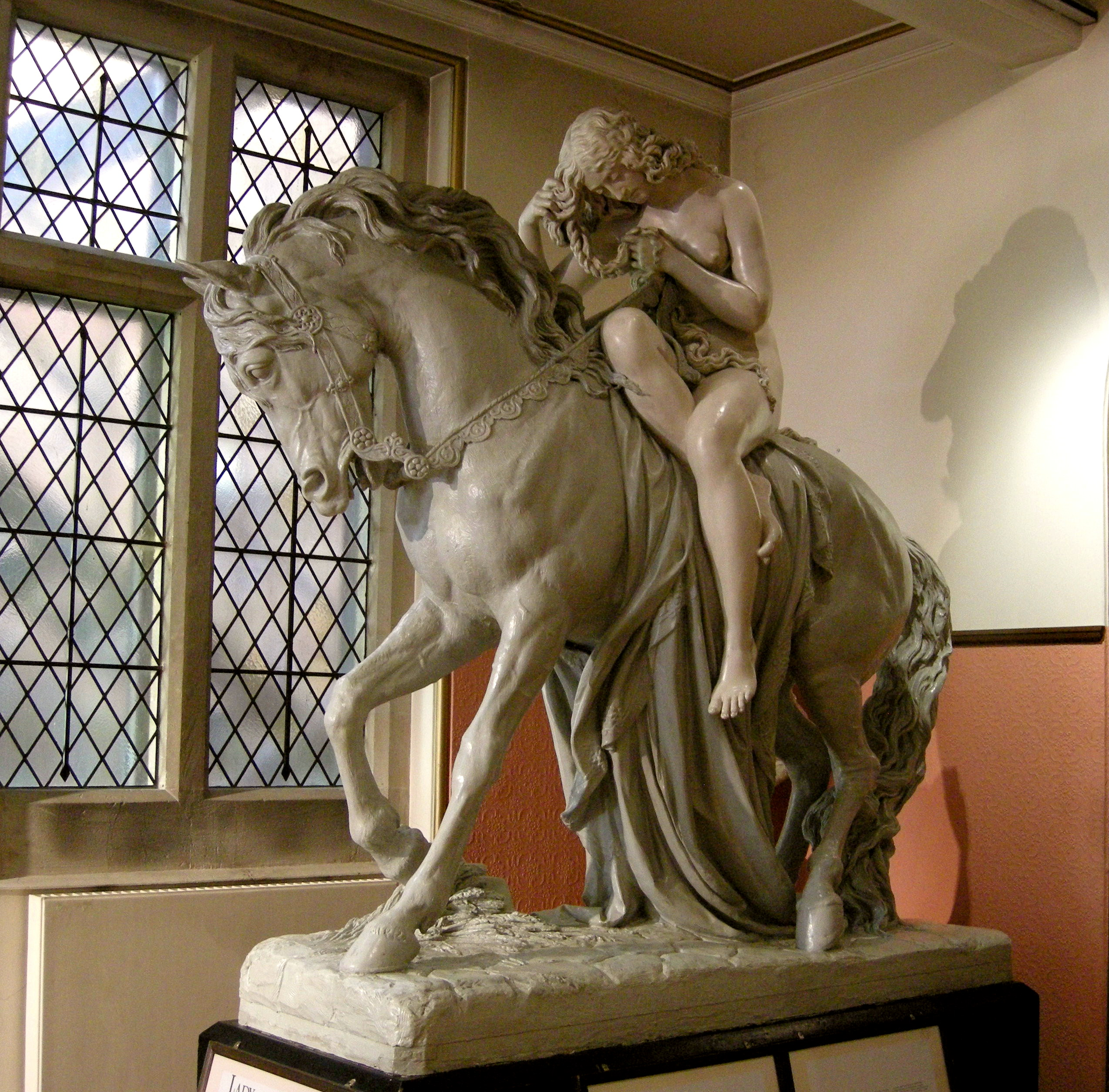
Lady Godiva at Maidstone Museum

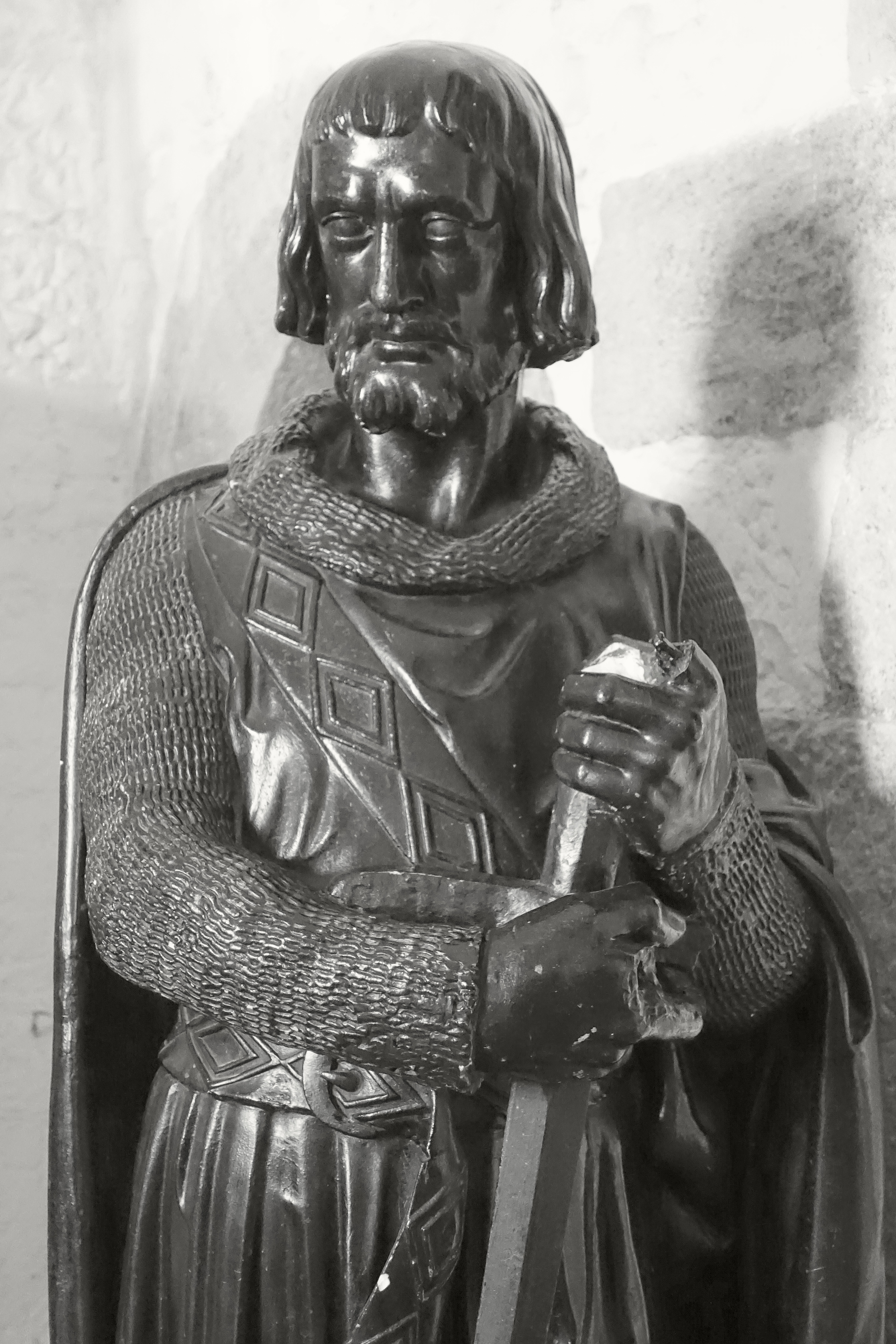
William Longespée, 3rd Earl of Salisbury

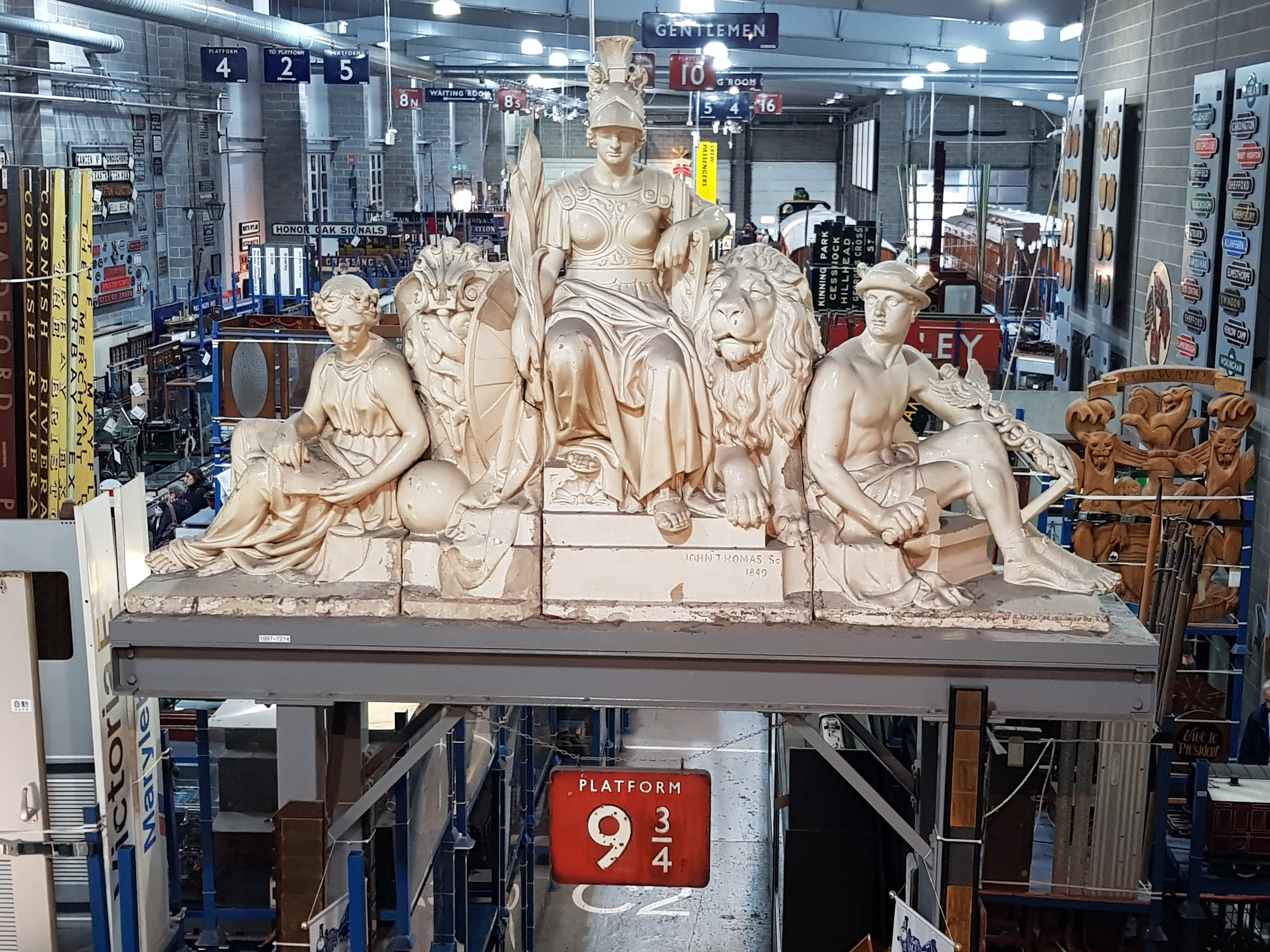
Britannia, National Railway Museum, York

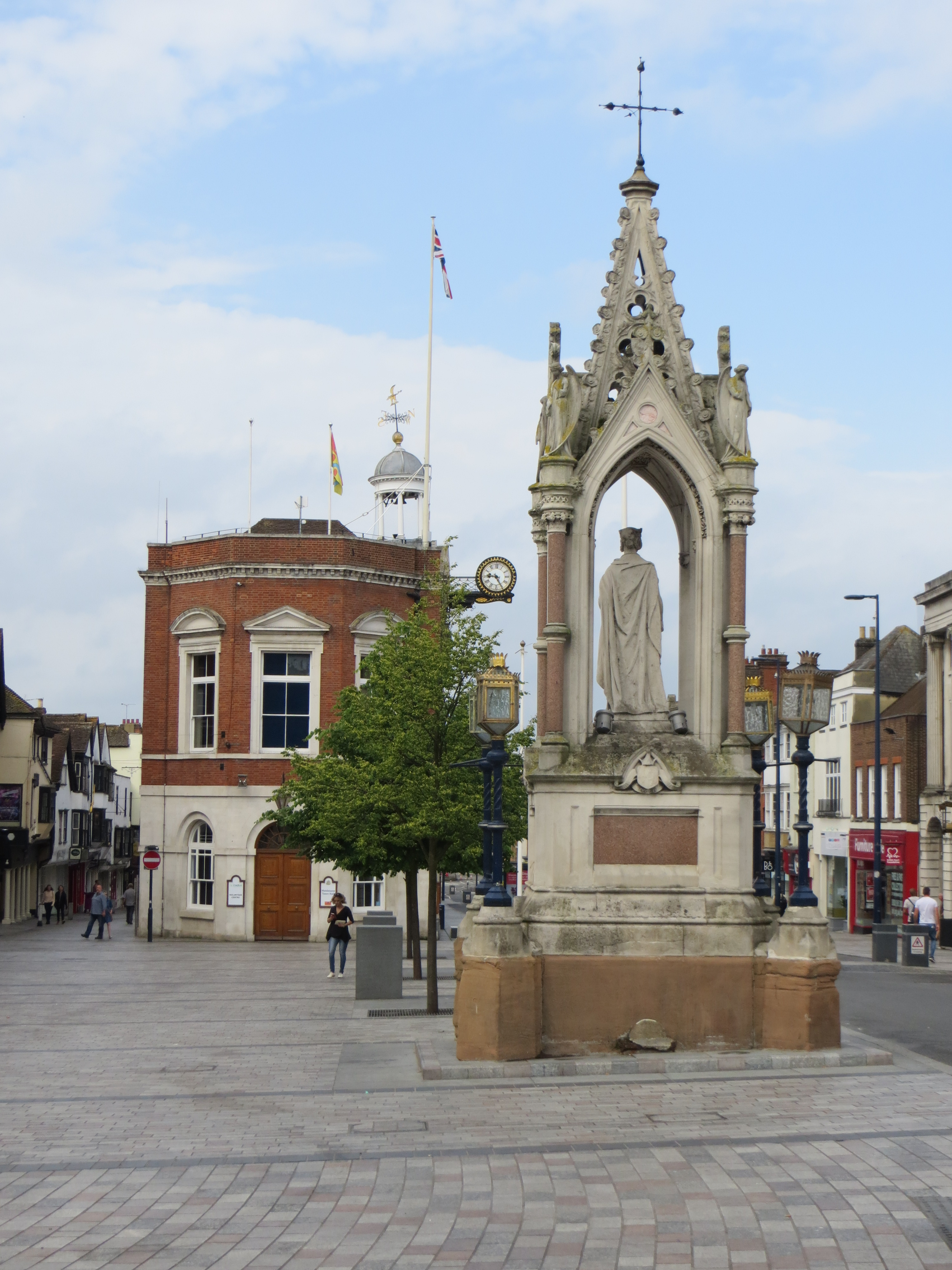
Queen's Monument, Maidstone, Kent

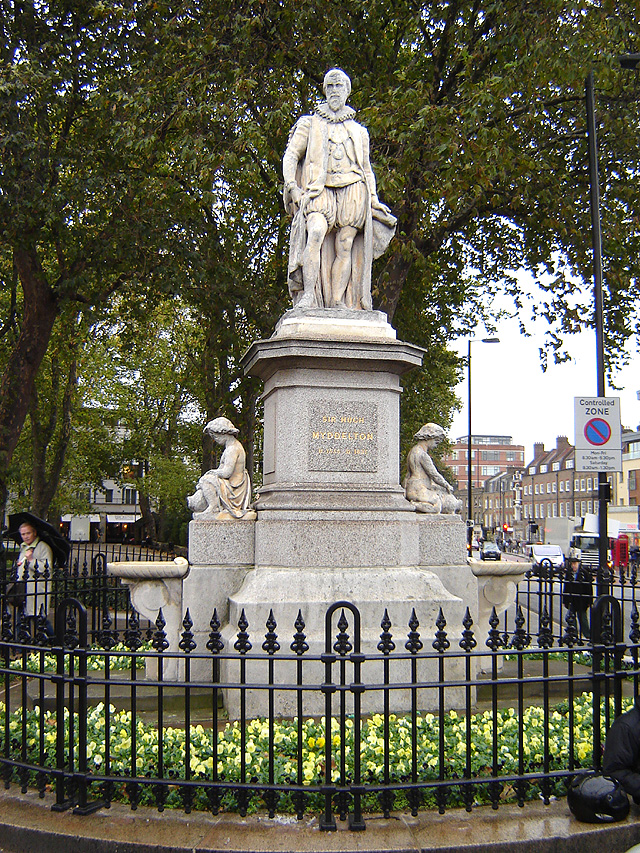
Statue of Hugh Myddelton at Islington Green

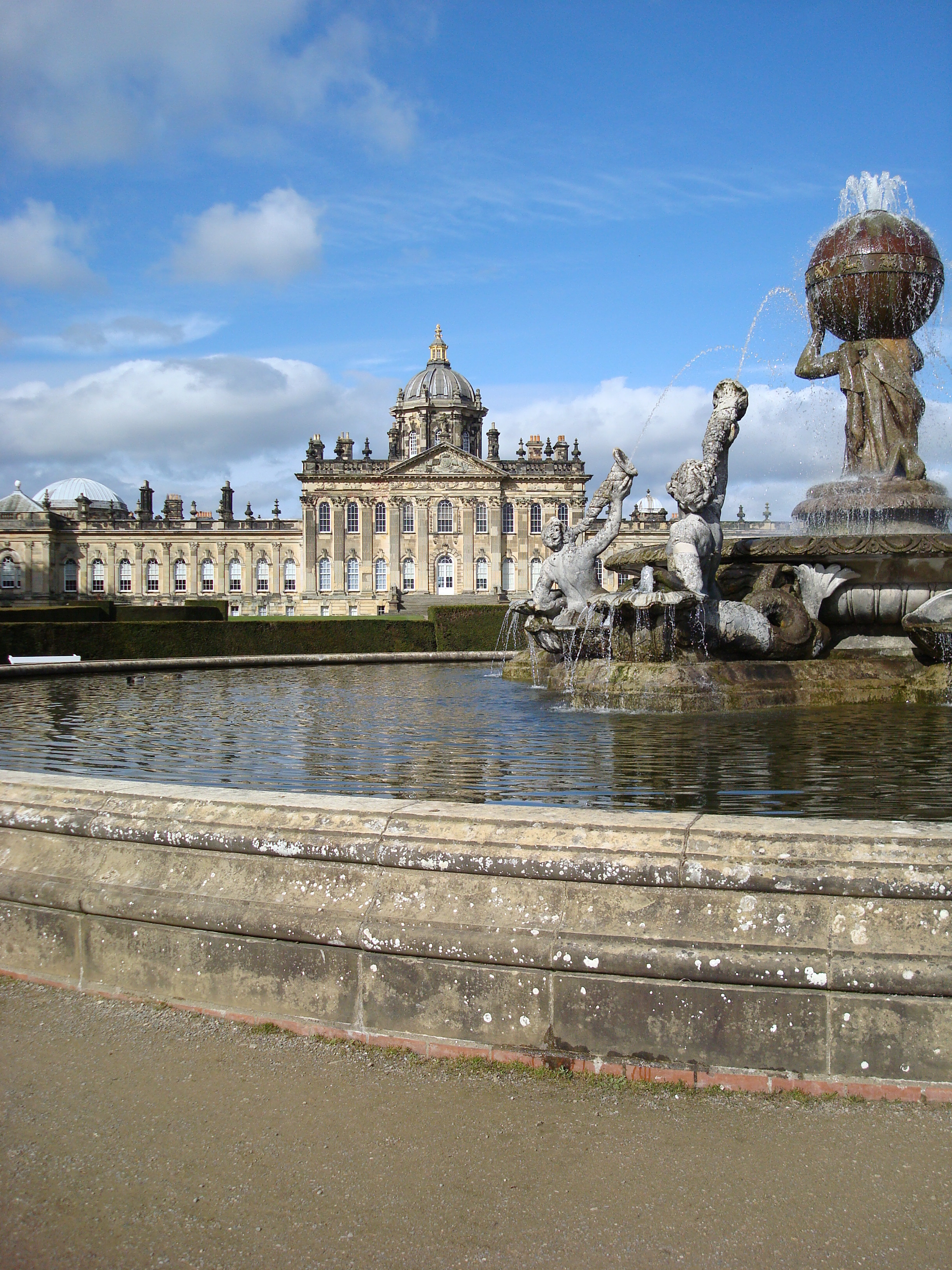
Atlas Fountain at Castle Howard

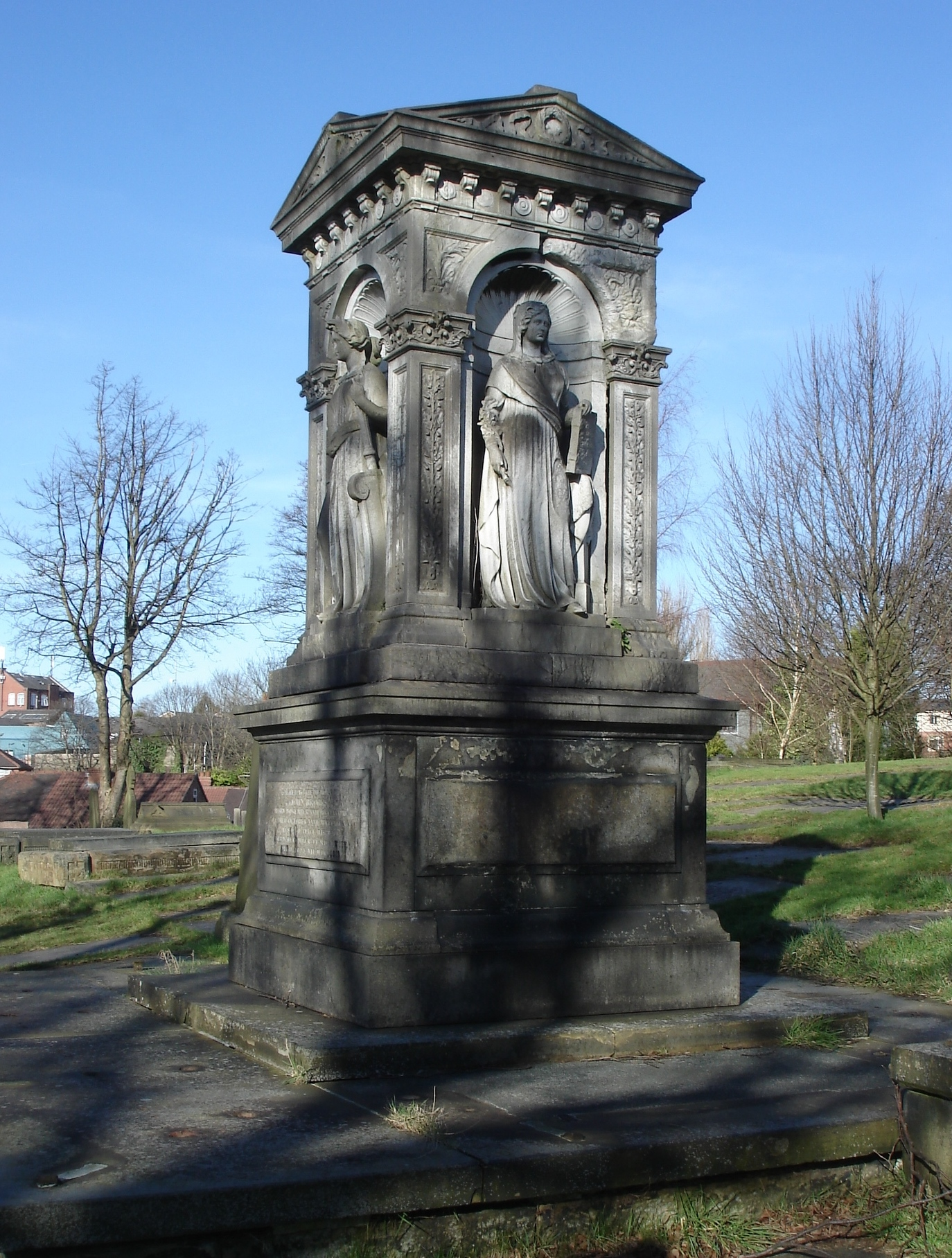
John Brooks monument, Prestwich church. 1849.

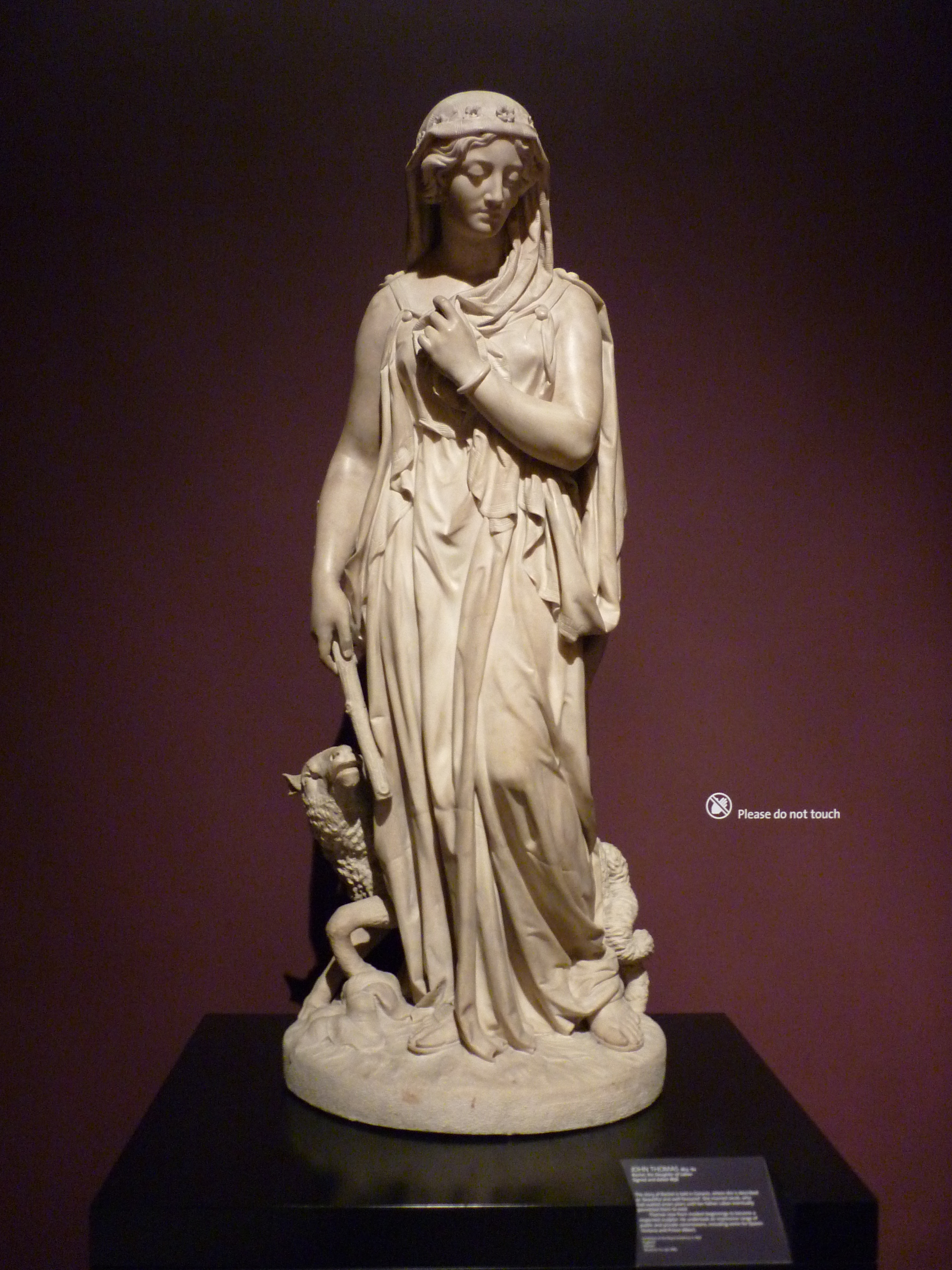
Rachel daughter of Laban. 1856. V&A Museum London

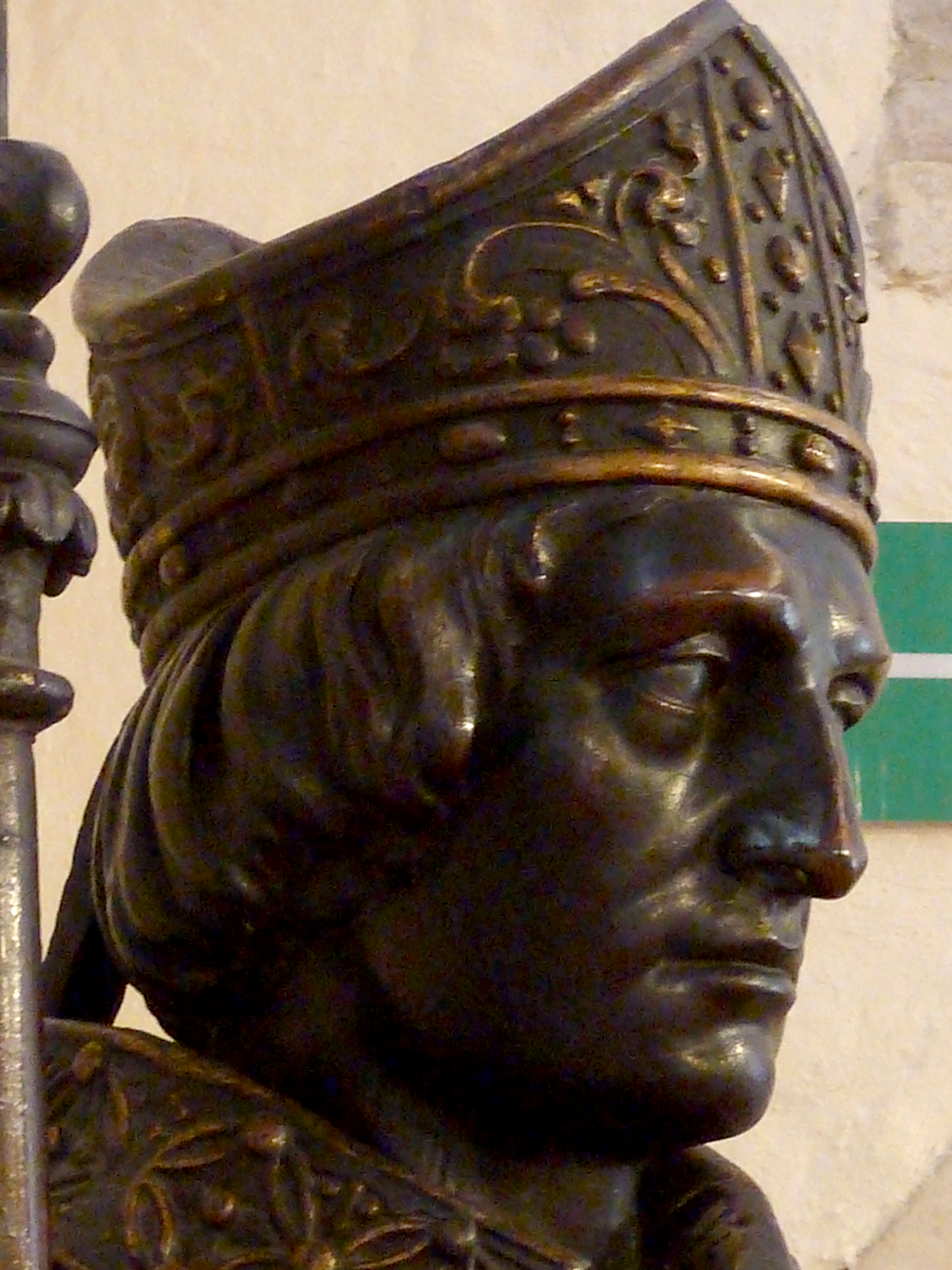
Head of Stephen Langton. Part of maquette for a bronze which is now in House of Lords.

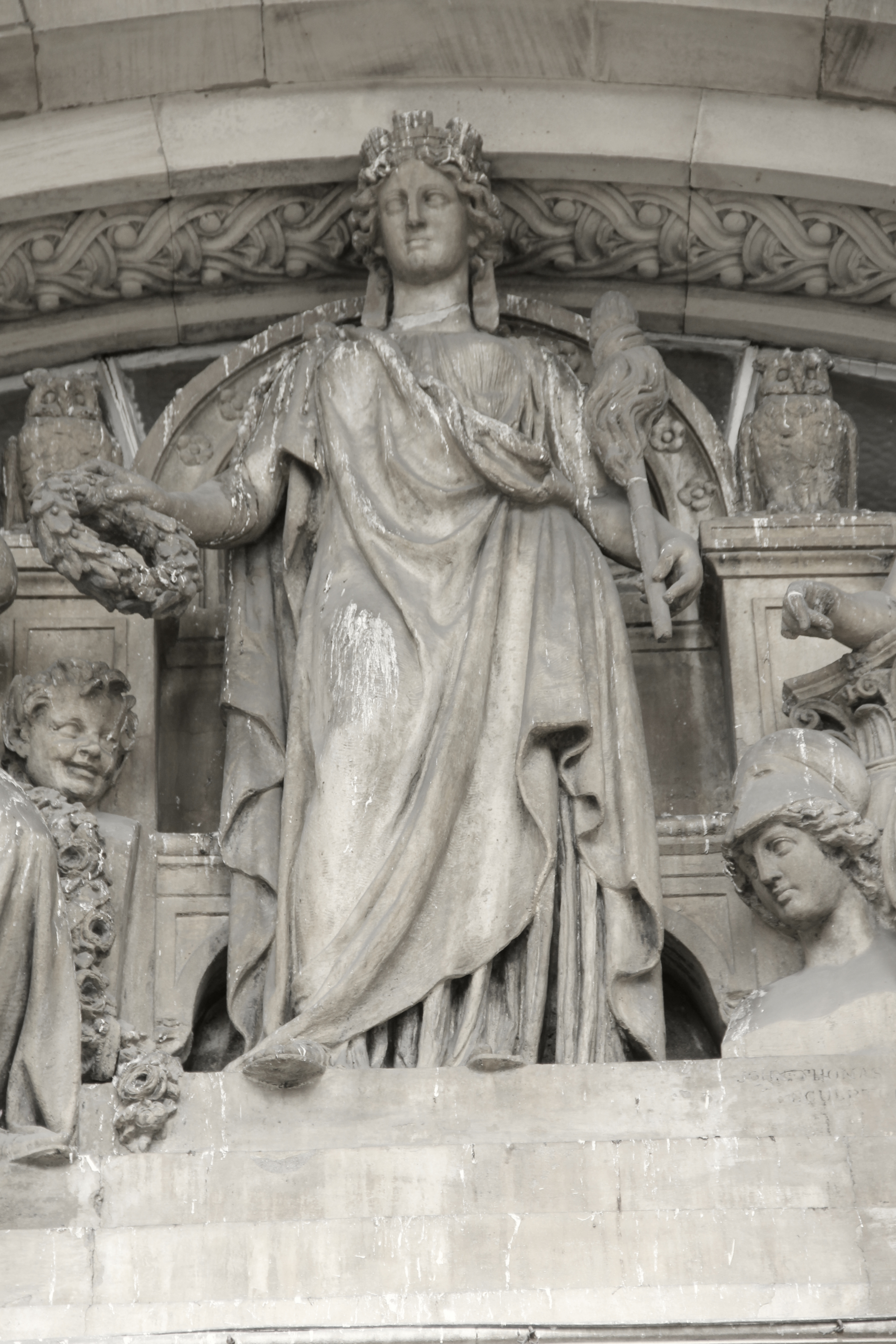
Figure of Athena on Leeds Town Hall

== Sources ==
- John Thomas (1813-1862)
- John Thomas (1813-1862), sculptor, a biography
- John Thomas (1813-1862)
- Charles Barry, Jun. (1824-1900) - by Christie's
- "Museum of Childhood". Archived from the original on 18 March 2008.
