= Statue of Hugh Myddelton, Islington Green =

1862 statue by John Thomas

Statue of Hugh Myddelton
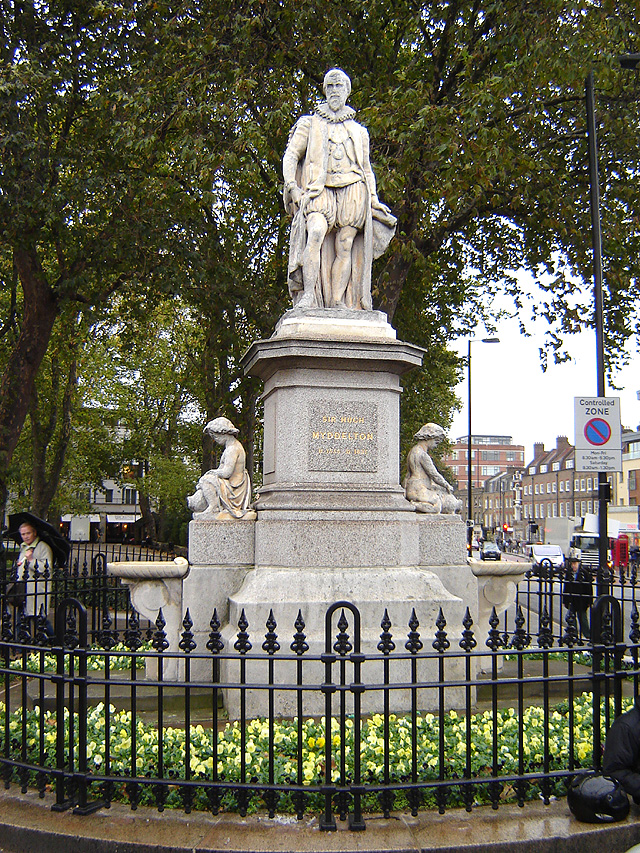
- The statue in 2005
- Artist: John Thomas
- Year: 1862
- Medium: Sicilian marble
- Subject: Hugh Myddelton
- Location: Islington Green; London; 51°32′08″N 0°06′13″W

The Statue of Hugh Myddelton in Islington Green, London, England, commemorates Hugh Myddelton (1560–1631) near the site of the original terminus of the New River in whose construction he had played a major role.

John Thomas (1813–1862) was commissioned to create the sculpture which was unveiled by the Chancellor of the Exchequer, William Gladstone, in 1862. It was presented jointly by Sir Samuel Morton Peto, MP for Finsbury, the New River Company, by then a significant local landowner, and the local authority.

The statue is made from Sicilian marble supported by a granite plinth. The plinth is flanked by two putti with urns, which form part of a fountain.

On 29 September 2013 representatives of the Welsh Mines Preservation Trust and New River Action Group laid a wreath at the statue to mark the 400th anniversary of the opening of the New River.

== See also ==
- List of public art in the London Borough of Islington
