= Islington Green =

Park in Islington, London

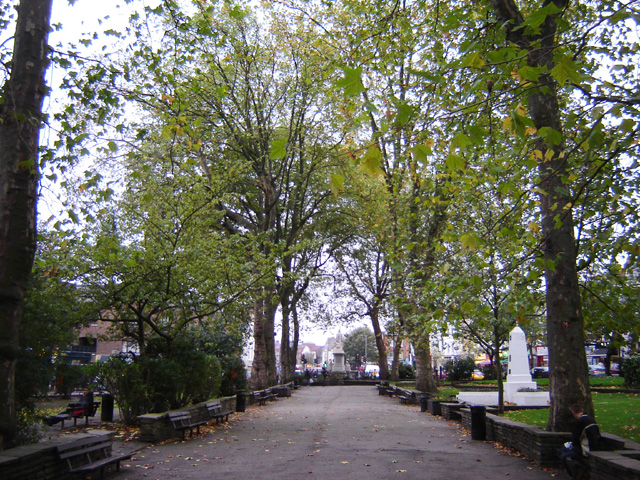
- Islington Green looking south.
- Interactive map of Islington Green
- Type: Open land
- Location: London Borough of Islington
- Nearest city: London
- Coordinates: 51°32′10″N 0°6′11″W

Islington Green is a small triangle of open land at the convergence of Upper Street and Essex Road (once called Lower Street) in the London Borough of Islington. It roughly marks the northern boundary between the modern district of Angel and Islington proper.

Historically it is not an old village green like others in London (for example, Shacklewell Green), but a surviving patch of common land like Newington Green to the north, that was carved out of old manorial wasteland where local farmers and tenants had free grazing rights. The original land was far more extensive but was largely built over in the 19th century. Since 2015 the site has been protected as a Centenary Field with Fields in Trust, part of the World War I commemorative programme protecting parks and green spaces in perpetuity.

In 1885, Henry Vigar-Harries described Islington Green "where the young love to skip in buoyant glee when the summer sun gladdens the air" and how "within a mile and a half from this spot there are 1,030 public houses and beer shops".

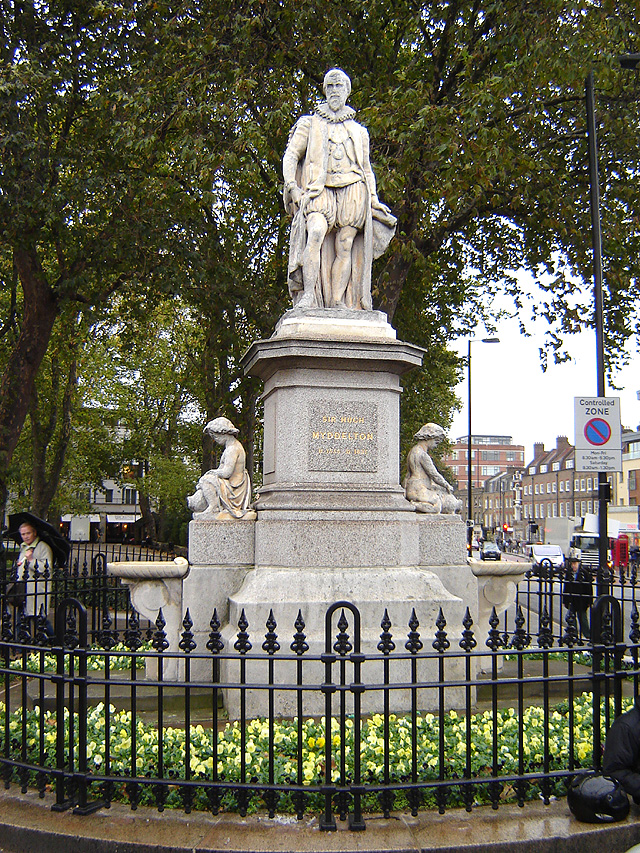
Statue of Sir Hugh Myddleton by John Thomas, surmounting a fountain at the southern end of the green.

The green contains a memorial to the dead of both world wars as well as a statue of Sir Hugh Myddleton, designer of the New River that was so important to London's water supply from the 17th century onwards. The statue incorporates a fountain, which is no longer functioning. The New River itself once terminated about a kilometre to the south in Finsbury, but the section that can be still walked in modern times, the New River Walk, ends just to the north of the green off Essex Road. The north side of the green also carries a plaque to the once-famous Collins's Music Hall, which burned down in 1958. A Waterstones bookshop now occupies the site.

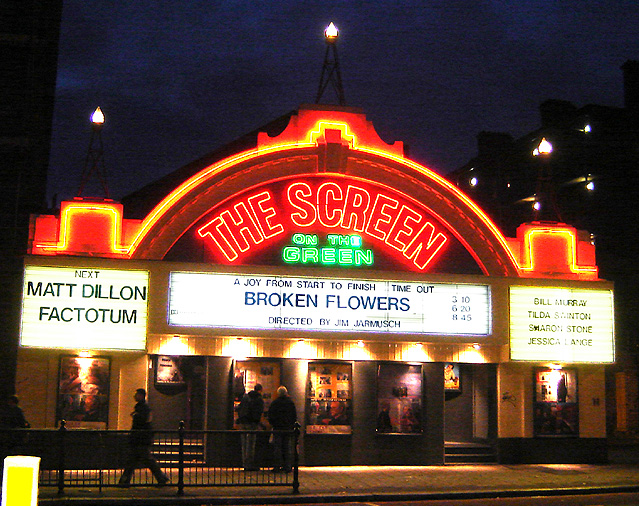
The green has given its name to the independent cinema.

== Transport ==
- Angel tube station
- Essex Road railway station
