= Islington =

District of London, England

Coordinates: 51.5440°N 0.1027°W

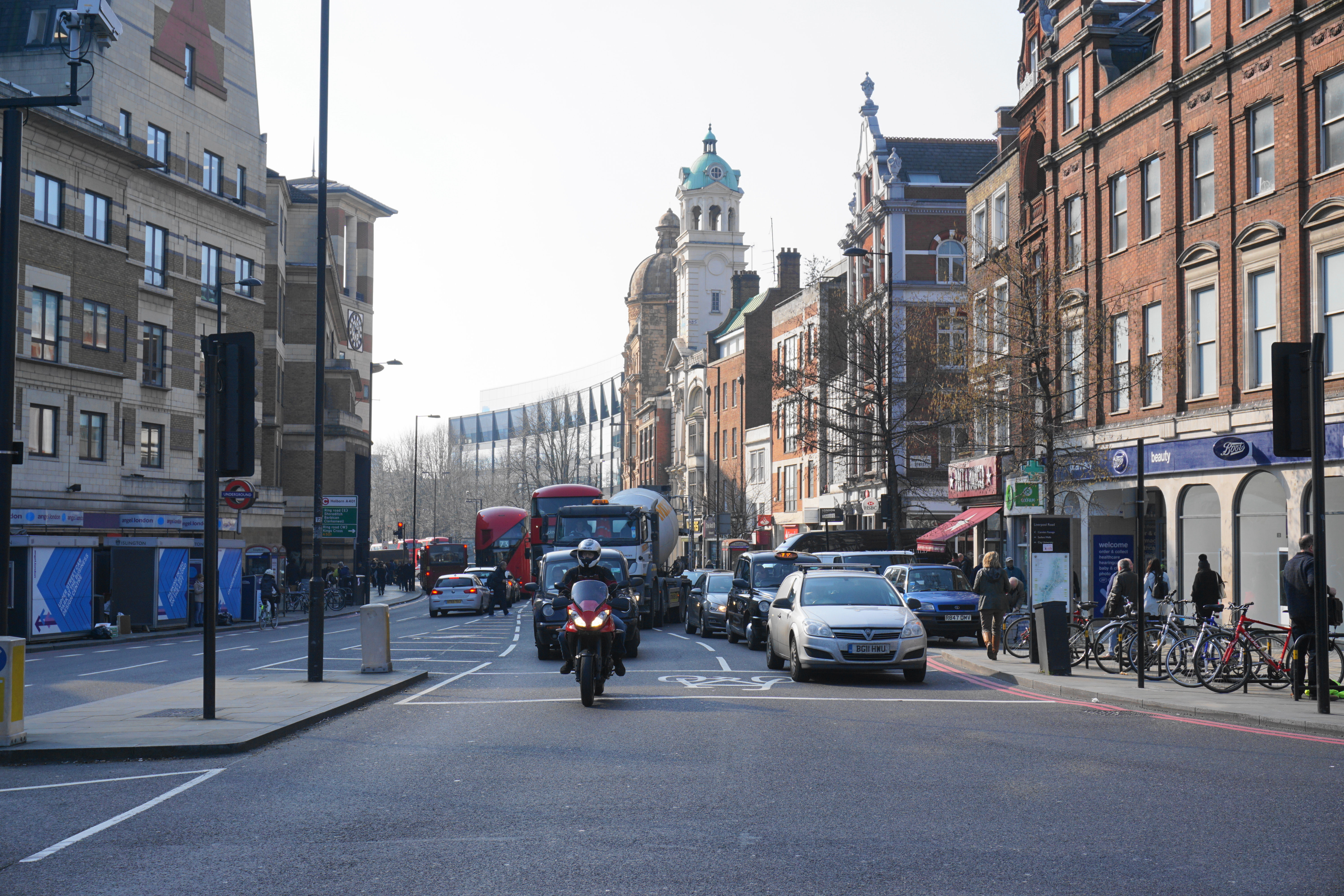
- Islington High Street, looking south towards Pentonville Road

- Location within Greater London
- Area: 14.86 km^{2} (5.74 sq mi) (whole Borough)
- Population: 216,600 (2021 census) (whole borough)
  - Density: 14,576/km^{2} (37,750/sq mi)
- OS grid reference: TQ315844
- London borough: Islington
- Ceremonial county: Greater London
- Region: London
- Country: England
- Sovereign state: United Kingdom
- Post town: LONDON
- Postcode district: N1, N1C, N5, N7, N19, EC1
- Dialling code: 020
- Police: Metropolitan
- Fire: London
- Ambulance: London
- UK Parliament: Islington North Islington South and Finsbury
- London Assembly: North East

Islington (/ˈɪzlɪŋtən/ IZ-ling-tən) is an inner-city area of north London, England, within the wider London Borough of Islington. It is a mainly residential district of Inner London, extending from Islington's High Street to Highbury Fields and Regent's Canal, encompassing the area around the busy High Street, Upper Street, Essex Road, and Southgate Road to the east.

== History ==
The Metropolitan Borough of Islington in 1916. The borough inherited the much older boundaries of the ancient parish of Islington.

=== Toponymy ===
The manor of Islington was named by the Saxons Giseldone (1005), then Gislandune (1062). The name means "Gīsla's hill" from the Old English personal name Gīsla and dun ("hill", "down"). The name later mutated to Isledon, which remained in use well into the 17th century when the modern form arose. The manor, which was served by the ancient parish of Islington, later sub-divided, with new estates such as Neweton Berewe, Bernersbury, Hey-bury and Canonesbury – names first recorded in the 13th and 14th centuries) co-existing with the rump of the manor of Islington. The ancient parish of Islington continued to serve the rump manor of Islington and also the various manors that had broken away from it.

=== Origins ===
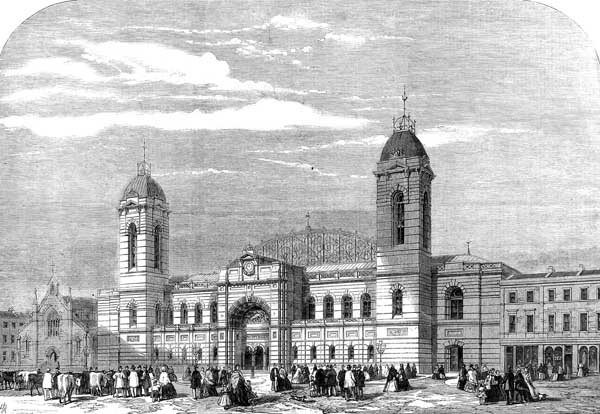
1861 Royal Agricultural Hall, view from Liverpool Road. Now the rear entrance to the Business Design Centre

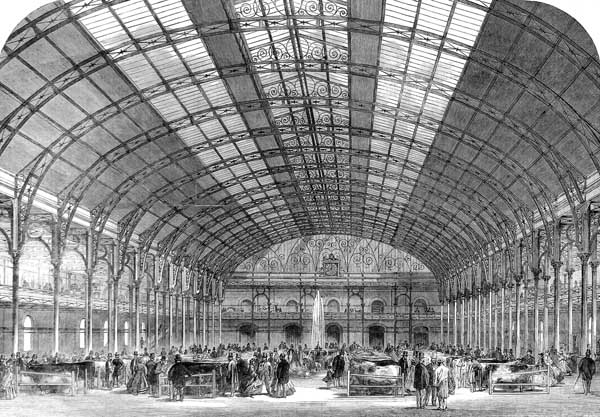
1861 Cattle show at the Royal Agricultural Hall

From the Middle Ages until the late 19th century, Islington was a parish of the hundred of Ossulstone, in the county of Middlesex. Some roads on the edge of the area, including Essex Road, were known as streets by the medieval period, possibly indicating a Roman origin, but little physical evidence remains. In the 14th century, the Great North Road from the City of London's Aldersgate came into use, leading north to York and Edinburgh. This was along the line of modern Upper Street, with a toll gate at The Angel, Islington, defining the extent of the village. The Back Road, the modern Liverpool Road, was primarily a drovers' road where cattle would be rested before the final leg of their journey to Smithfield. Pens and sheds were erected along this road to accommodate the animals.

The first recorded church, St Mary's, was erected in the twelfth century and was replaced in the fifteenth century. Islington lay on the estates of the Bishop of London and the Dean and Chapter of St Pauls. There were substantial medieval moated manor houses in the area, principally at Canonbury and Highbury. In 1548, there were 440 communicants listed and the rural atmosphere, with access to the City and Westminster, made it a popular residence for the rich and eminent. The local inns harboured many fugitives and sheltered recusants.

=== Water sources ===
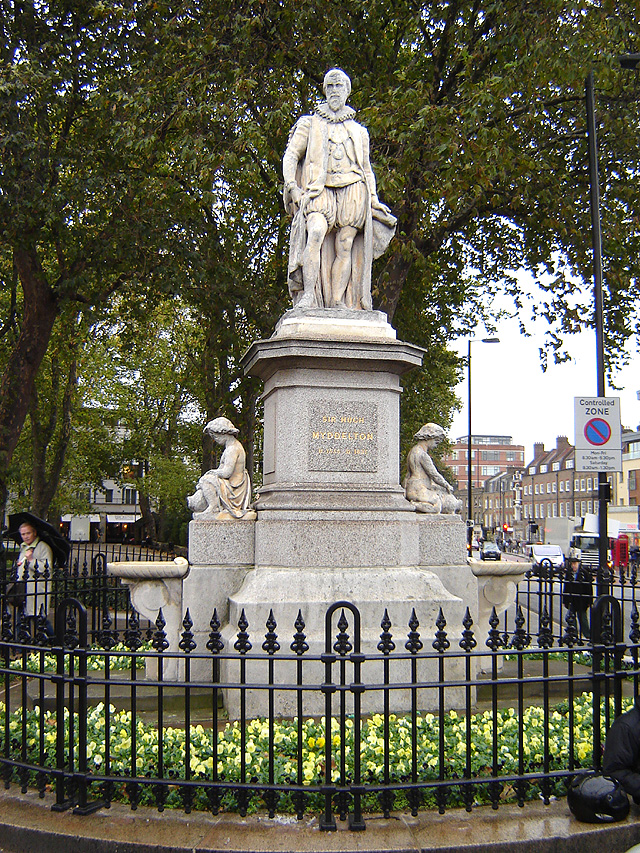
A statue of Hugh Myddelton, creator of the New River, surmounts a drinking fountain at Islington Green. (November 2005)

The hill on which Islington stands has long supplied the City of London with water, the first projects drawing water through wooden pipes from the many springs that lay at its foot, in Finsbury. These included Sadler's Wells, London Spa and Clerkenwell.

By the 17th century these traditional sources were inadequate to supply the growing population and plans were laid to construct a waterway, the New River, to bring fresh water from the source of the River Lea, in Hertfordshire to New River Head, below Islington in Finsbury. The river was opened on 29 September 1613 by Sir Hugh Myddelton, the constructor of the project. His statue still stands where Upper Street meets Essex Road. The course of the river ran to the east of Upper Street, and much of its course is now covered and forms a linear park through the area.

The Regent's Canal passes through Islington, for much of which in an 886-metre (2,907 ft) tunnel that runs from Colebrook Row east of the Angel, to emerge at Muriel Street near Caledonian Road. The stretch is marked above with a series of pavement plaques so walkers may find their way from one entrance to the other. The area of the canal east of the tunnel and north of the City Road was once dominated by much warehousing and industry surrounding the large City Road Basin and Wenlock Basin. Those old buildings that survive here are now largely residential or small creative work units. This stretch has an old double-fronted pub The Narrowboat, one side accessed from the towpath.

The canal was constructed in 1820 to carry cargo from Limehouse into the canal system. There is no tow-path in the tunnel so bargees had to walk their barges through, braced against the roof. Commercial use of the canal has declined since the 1960s.

=== Market gardens and entertainments ===
In the 17th and 18th centuries the availability of water made Islington a good place for growing vegetables to feed London. The manor became a popular excursion destination for Londoners, attracted to the area by its rural feel. Many public houses were therefore built to serve the needs of both the excursionists and travellers on the turnpike. By 1716, there were 56 ale-house keepers in Upper Street, also offering pleasure and tea gardens, and activities such as archery, skittle alleys and bowling. By the 18th century, music and dancing were offered, together with billiards, firework displays and balloon ascents. The King's Head Tavern, now a Victorian building with a theatre, has remained on the same site, opposite the parish church, since 1543. The founder of the theatre, Dan Crawford, who died in 2005, disagreed with the introduction of decimal coinage. For twenty-plus years after decimalisation (on 15 February 1971), the bar continued to show prices and charge for drinks in pre-decimalisation currency.

By the 19th century many music halls and theatres were established around Islington Green. One such was Collins's Music Hall, the remains of which are now partly incorporated into a bookshop. The remainder of the Hall has been redeveloped into a new theatre, with its entrance at the bottom of Essex Road. It stood on the site of the Landsdowne Tavern, where the landlord had built an entertainment room for customers who wanted to sing (and later for professional entertainers). It was founded in 1862 by Samuel Thomas Collins Vagg and by 1897 had become a 1,800-seat theatre with 10 bars. The theatre suffered damage in a fire in 1958 and has not reopened. Between 92 and 162 acts were put on each evening and performers who started there included Marie Lloyd, George Robey, Harry Lauder, Harry Tate, George Formby, Vesta Tilley, Tommy Trinder, Gracie Fields, Tommy Handley and Norman Wisdom.

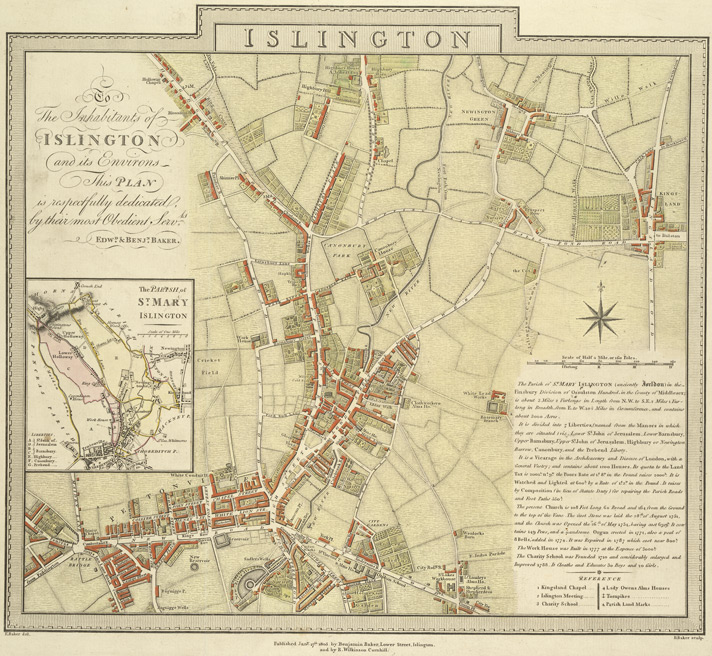
An 1805 map of Islington

The Islington Literary and Scientific Society was established in 1833 and first met in Mr. Edgeworth's Academy on Upper Street. Its goal was to spread knowledge through lectures, discussions, and experiments, politics and theology being forbidden. A building, the Literary and Scientific Institution, was erected in 1837 in Wellington (later Almeida) Street, designed by Roumieu and Gough in a stuccoed Grecian style. It included a library (containing 3,300 volumes in 1839), reading room, museum, laboratory, and lecture theatre seating 500. The subscription was two guineas a year. After the library was sold off in 1872, the building was sold or leased in 1874 to the Wellington Club, which occupied it until 1886. In 1885 the hall was used for concerts, balls, and public meetings. The Salvation Army bought the building in 1890, renamed it the Wellington Castle barracks, and remained there until 1955. The building became a factory and showroom for Beck's British Carnival Novelties for a few years from 1956, after which it stood empty. In 1978 a campaign began with the goal to redevelop the building as a theatre. A public appeal was launched in 1981, and a festival of avant-garde theatre and music was held there and at other Islington venues in 1982. What has become the successful Almeida Theatre was founded.

=== Royal Agricultural Hall ===
The Royal Agricultural Hall was built in 1862 on the Liverpool Road site of William Dixon's Cattle Layers. The hall was 75 ft high and the arched glass roof spanned 125 ft. It was built for the annual Smithfield Show in December of that year but was popular for other purposes, including recitals and the Royal Tournament. It was the primary exhibition site for London until the 20th century and the largest building of its kind, holding up to 50,000 people. It was requisitioned for use by the Mount Pleasant sorting office during World War II and never re-opened. The main hall has now been incorporated into the Business Design Centre.

=== Islington Pals ===
At the beginning of World War I the enthusiastic response to Lord Kitchener's call to arms, 'Your King and Country Need You', overwhelmed the ability of the Army to absorb the volunteers. Soon local committees were recruiting complete units, often from men from particular localities or backgrounds who wished to serve together: these were known as 'Pals battalions'. In February 1915 Kitchener approached the 28 Metropolitan Borough Councils in the County of London, and the 'Great Metropolitan Recruiting Campaign' went ahead in April, with each mayor asked to raise a unit of local men. The Mayor and Borough of Islington agreed and on 18 May they were authorised to raise the 21st (Service) Battalion, Middlesex Regiment (Islington). The 'Islington Pals' served on the Western Front from 1916 to 1918 as part of 40th Division, seeing action against the Hindenburg Line and at Bourlon Wood. After the huge casualties it suffered during the German spring offensive of March–April 1918, the battalion went back to England to be reconstituted from men of lower medical category, and never returned to the Western Front. It was disbanded soon after the Armistice with Germany.

=== Housing ===
Some early development took place to accommodate the popularity of the nearby Sadler's Wells, which became a resort in the 16th century, but the 19th century saw the greatest expansion in housing, soon to cover the whole parish. In 1801, the population was 10,212, but by 1891 this had increased to 319,143. This rapid expansion was partly due to the introduction of horse-drawn omnibuses in 1830. Large well-built houses and fashionable squares drew clerks, artisans and professionals to the district. However, from the middle of the 19th century the poor were being displaced by clearances in inner London to build the new railway stations and goods yards. Many of the displaced settled in Islington, with the houses becoming occupied by many families. This, combined with the railways pushing into outer Middlesex, reduced Islington's attraction for the "better off" as it became "unfashionable". The area fell into a long decline; and by the mid-20th century, it was largely run-down and a byword for urban poverty.

The Blitz caused severe damage to Islington's housing stock, with 3,200 dwellings destroyed. Before the war, a number of 1930s council housing blocks had been added to the stock. After the war, partly as a result of bomb site redevelopment, the council housing boom got into its stride, reaching its peak in the 1960s: several extensive estates were constructed, by both the Metropolitan Borough of Islington and the London County Council. Clearance of the worst terraced housing was undertaken, but Islington continued to be very densely populated. The district has many council blocks, and the local authority has begun to replace some of them.

From the 1960s, the remaining Georgian terraces were rediscovered by middle-class families. Many of the houses were rehabilitated, and the area became newly fashionable. This displacement of the poor by the aspirational has become known as gentrification. Among the new residents were a number of figures who became central in the New Labour movement, including Tony Blair before his victory in the 1997 general election. According to The Guardian in 2006, "Islington is widely regarded as the spiritual home of Britain's left-wing intelligentsia." The Granita Pact between Gordon Brown and Tony Blair is said to have been made at a now defunct restaurant on Upper Street.

The African National Congress's headquarters in exile was based on Penton Street. It was the target of a bomb attack in 1982.

The completion of the Victoria line and redevelopment of Angel tube station created the conditions for developers to renovate many of the early Victorian and Georgian townhouses. They also built new developments. Islington remains a district with diverse inhabitants, with its private houses and apartments not far from social housing in immediately neighbouring wards such as Finsbury and Clerkenwell to the south, Bloomsbury and King's Cross to the west, and Highbury to the north west, and also the Hackney districts of De Beauvoir and Old Street to the north east.

Islington is the most densely populated borough in the UK according to the 2011 census, with a population density of 138.7 people per hectare, compared to an average of 52.0 for London.

== Great North Road ==
The urbanisation of Islington began with ribbon development along the Great North Road (the modern A1). which is known (south to north) as Islington High Street, Upper Street, Holloway Road and Archway Road as it passes through the district. In 1716 the Great North Road came under the control of the newly formed Islington Turnpike Trust. The Trust grew rapidly, and soon had control of most major roads in the area, building a number of major road arteries through the expanding residential areas, including Caledonian Road, Euston Road, City Road and New North Road.

=== Islington High Street ===
Islington High Street runs approximately 500 metres (0.31 mi) from the intersection of Pentonville Road and City Road at the south end to Islington Green at the north end, where it branches into Upper Street and Essex Road (former Lower Street). The earliest reference to Islington High Street is its appearance on a 1590 map of the area. At this time, nine inns (including the famous Angel, which has subsequently given its name to the area around High Street), as well as housing and a public pond were shown lining the street.

The Peacock Inn at 11 Islington High Street dates from 1564, although the current façade dates from 1857. It featured in Tom Brown's Schooldays as the inn at which Tom stays prior to travelling to Rugby School. It closed in 1962, although the building still stands.

Angel tube station on Islington High Street has the longest escalator on the London Underground system, at 318 steps.

=== Upper Street ===
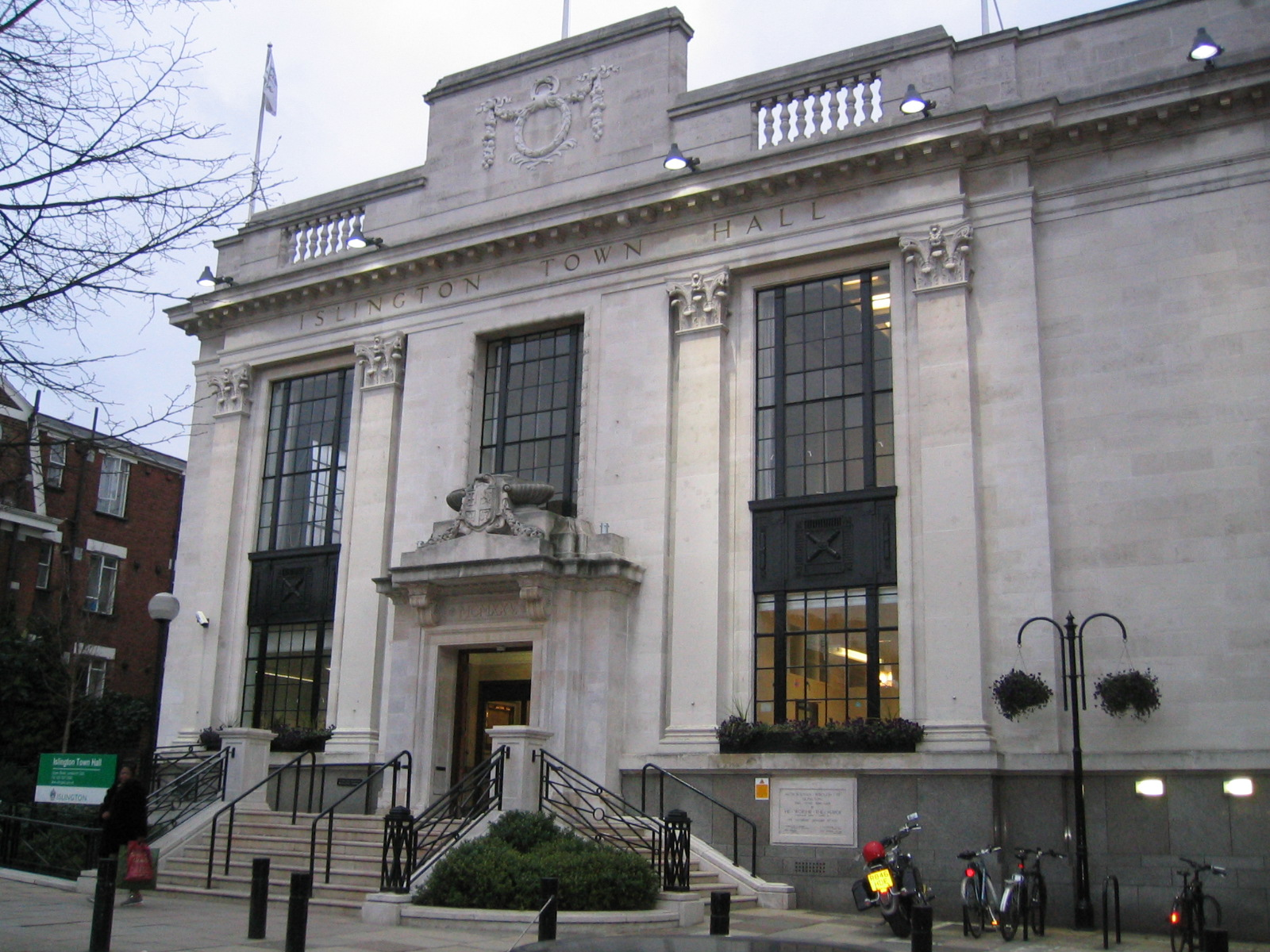
Islington Town Hall in Upper Street

Upper Street is Islington's main shopping street. The parish church, St Mary's, is located on Upper Street.

== Business and employment ==
The Angel business improvement district (BID), is an area centred on the Angel tube station, and which includes parts of southern Islington and neighbouring Clerkenwell.

== In culture ==
Islington features extensively in modern English literature and culture:

=== Books ===
- Islington locations appear in many novels and other writings by Charles Dickens, including:
  - Oliver Twist (1837–1839): Mr Brownlow's house is in Pentonville, and several scenes take place in and around Islington.
  - The Christmas story The Lamplighter (1838) is partially set in Canonbury, near Canonbury Tower.
  - Martin Chuzzlewit (1844): Tom Pinch and his sister, Ruth, take lodgings in Islington.
  - David Copperfield (1849–50): Wilkins Micawber lives in City Road early in the novel.
  - Bleak House (1852–53): William Guppy, a law clerk, lives in Pentonville.
  - Our Mutual Friend (1864–65): the Wilfers live in Holloway.
- In The Way We Live Now (1875) by Anthony Trollope, the glamorous widow, Mrs Hurtle, has lodgings in Islington. In the same book the upper class cad Sir Felix visits a music hall on the City Road with Ruby, who vainly hopes to marry him.
- In The Diary of a Nobody (first serialized in Punch magazine in 1888–89 and first printed in book form, in 1892), an English comic novel written by George Grossmith and his brother Weedon Grossmith, the main character lives off the Holloway Road in Brickfield Terrace.
- Upper Street and other Islington locations appear throughout George Gissing's The Nether World (1889).
- In Sinister Street (1914), by Compton MacKenzie, Michael Fane, the main protagonist, undertakes teenage rebellion by leaving boring, respectable, upper-middle class South Kensington for a couple of visits to the exciting, louche, working class Holloway district of Islington.
- Islington is referred to in the M. R. James short ghost story "Two Doctors" published in A Thin Ghost and Others in 1919.
- The Royal Agricultural Hall on Liverpool Road features as the location for a Victorian walking match in Peter Lovesey's novel Wobble to Death, (1970) and its BBC Radio's Saturday Night Theatre adaptation.
- Simon Gray's play Otherwise Engaged (1975) is set in Islington.
- Douglas Adams lived in Arlington Avenue. The phone number of his house was 226 7709. In The Hitchhiker's Guide to the Galaxy when Arthur Dent and Ford Prefect are rescued in ZZ9 Plural Z Alpha, the probability of that happening was 2 to the power of 267,709 to one against. Douglas also used Islington as a setting in his novels, and named a character in his famous Hitchhikers' Guide to the Galaxy (1978) series, Hotblack Desiato, after a well-known local estate agent. Islington was also the place in which Arthur Dent meets Trillian during a party in a flat.
- Martha Grimes's fictional detective, Richard Jury, lives in a flat in Islington. He first appeared in the novel The Man With a Load of Mischief (1981).
- In Douglas Adams's Dirk Gently series commencing with Dirk Gently's Holistic Detective Agency (1987), Richard MacDuff's flat, and Susan Way's flat are all in Islington (though Dirk's office is on a fictional street).
- In Neil Gaiman's best-selling novel Neverwhere (1996), Islington is a fallen angel that lives under London, named after the Angel tube station.
- Nick Hornby's novels About a Boy (1998) and Slam (2007) are set in Islington.
- Zoë Heller's novel Notes on a Scandal (2003) is set in Islington.
- In the Harry Potter series by JK Rowling, commencing with Harry Potter and the Order of the Phoenix (2003), the eponymous Order is headquartered at Number 12 Grimmauld Place, a fictitious street in Islington. The house belonged to Sirius Black and Harry, Ron, and Hermione used it as a hideout in Harry Potter and the Deathly Hallows.
- Islington features throughout Charlie Higson's post-apocalyptic, young adult horror series, The Enemy, set in and around London. For example, in The Dead (2010), Islington is the destination of the group travelling on Greg's bus. Greg tells everyone but his son, Liam: "Get some sleep. We'll push on in the morning. I'll take you all as far as Islington. After that you're on your own."
- The Gaspard the Fox series of children's books, commencing in 2018, are set in Islington, inspired by the remarkable relationship between an urban fox and local author Zeb Soanes, who lives in Canonbury. James Mayhew's illustrations feature numerous local landmarks, including the Islington Green War Memorial, De Beauvoir Square and the Regent's Canal.

=== Music ===
- In Arthur Sullivan and B. C. Stephenson's comic opera, The Zoo (1875), two of the main characters are the Duke of Islington and his beloved, whom he asks to become the Duchess of Islington.
- In 2008, Sparks played their first 20 albums in 20 nights at the O2 Academy Islington to promote Exotic Creatures of the Deep. They marked the occasion with an exclusive release of the humorous song "Islington N1", in which sophisticated locals complain that the band's presence cheapens their neighbourhood (where "Everyone has all they need/Every dog is pedigreed").

=== Film ===
- In the 1979 film Scum, Donald Woods (played by John Fowler), inmate 3310, is revealed to live in Islington, on Almeida Street. Woods receives a letter from his parents concerning his dog, which recently had puppies. As Woods cannot read, he hires fellow inmate Ben Archer, played by Mick Ford, inmate number 4721, to read the entire letter to him aloud, including the Islington mailing address.

== Sports ==
There are over 60 sports and other types of physical activity on offer to the public in Islington, at more than approximately one hundred clubs, leisure centres, parks, community centres, and other venues. The Islington Boxing Club, on Hazellville Road, was founded in January 1974 and was originally based in the community hall of York Way Court, close to King's Cross Station.

The borough is home to top-flight professional football club Arsenal, whose sixty-thousand capacity stadium is in Holloway.

== Transport ==
The area is served by numerous bus routes, with a major bus interchange located near the Angel tube station. Red route and residents' parking restrictions apply throughout the area.

=== Nearby places ===
- Barnsbury
- Canonbury
- De Beauvoir Town
- Dalston
- Finsbury
- Highbury
- Hoxton
- Holloway
- King's Cross
- Pentonville
- St Luke's

=== Nearby stations ===
- Angel tube station
- Arsenal tube station
- Barbican tube station
- Canonbury railway station
- Drayton Park railway station
- Essex Road railway station
- Farringdon station
- Highbury & Islington station
- King's Cross railway station
- King's Cross St Pancras tube station
- Old Street station
- St Pancras railway station

== Education ==
According to latest figures published by the Department for Education, there are 47 primary and 10 state-funded secondary schools in Islington.

== Listed buildings ==
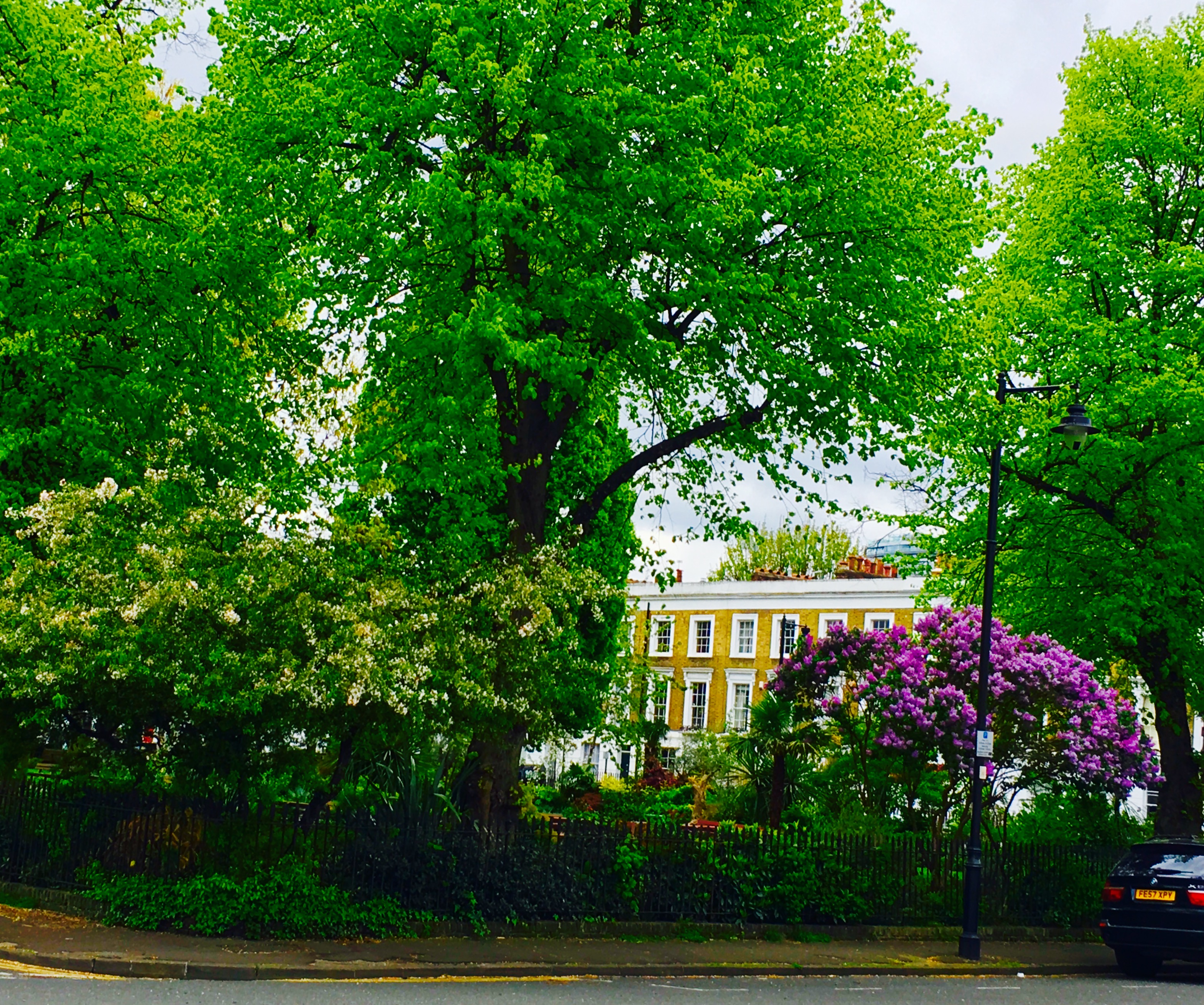
Grade II listed Arlington Square

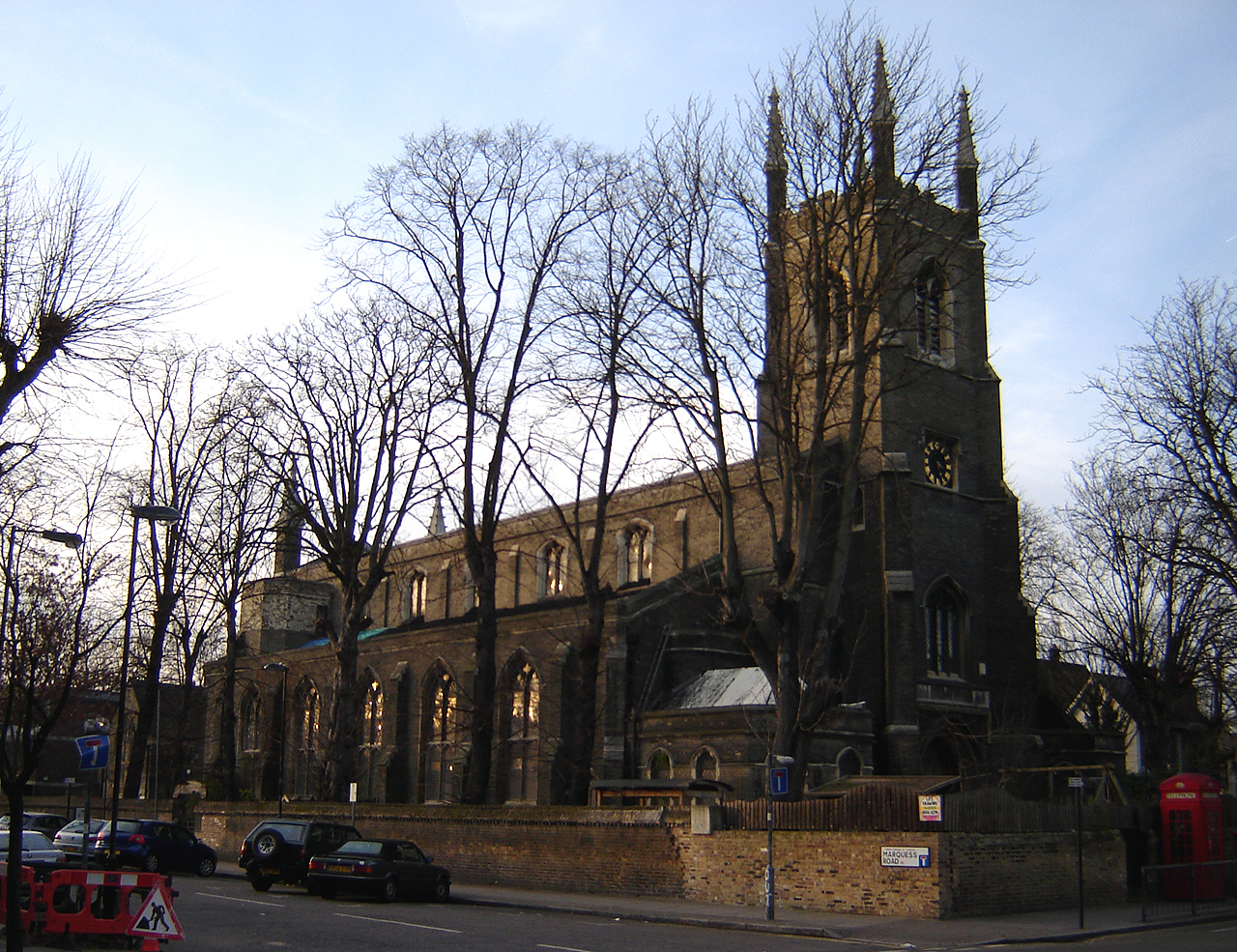
The Grade II* listed St Paul's Church seen from Essex Road. This was built in 1866 to a design by Sir Charles Barry, who went on to build the current Houses of Parliament. (March 2007)

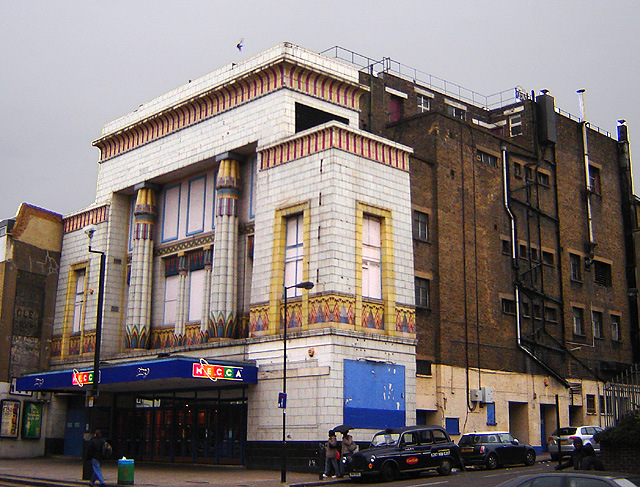
The Egyptianate former Carlton Cinema, Essex Road is Grade II listed, and has now closed. (November 2005)

Grade II*

English Heritage list three Grade II* listed buildings within Central Islington (and many more in surrounding districts):

- The Union Chapel
- 3 Terrett's Place (an 18th-century house on Upper Street)
- St Paul's Church, St Paul's Road (designed by Sir Charles Barry, now the St Paul's Steiner Project)
- Canonbury Tower

Grade II (selected):

The area contains numerous Georgian townhouses, shops and pubs. Many whole terraces are listed including much of Liverpool Road (one side of which is in Barnsbury) and Islington High Street/Upper Street. Other multiply listed streets include Arlington Square (one of the UK's top 10 garden squares), Camden Passage, Compton Terrace, Colebrooke Row, Cross Street, Duncan Terrace, Essex Road, Gibson Square and Milner Square.

Other Grade II–listed structures include:

- The Almeida Theatre
- The Angel Baptist Church, Chadwell Street
- The Angel building (formerly a public house and hotel, Lyons Corner House and Co-operative Bank), Islington High Street (gives its name to the area)
- The Business Design Centre (formerly part of the Royal Agricultural Hall), Upper Street
- The Camden Head public house, Camden Passage
- The Hope and Anchor public house, Upper Street
- Ironmonger Row Baths
- Islington Town Hall
- M. Manze's Pie and Eel Shop, Chapel Market (now closed)
- The Old Queen's Head public house, Essex Road
- Resurrection Manifestations GracePoint church (originally the Carlton Cinema, Essex Road, and later a Mecca Bingo Hall)
- St John's Church, Duncan Terrace
- St Mary's Church, Upper Street (rebuilt after the Second World War; only the spire remains from the original)
- The Central, South, West and North public libraries
- The York public house
- Emirates Stadium
- London Art House

== See also ==
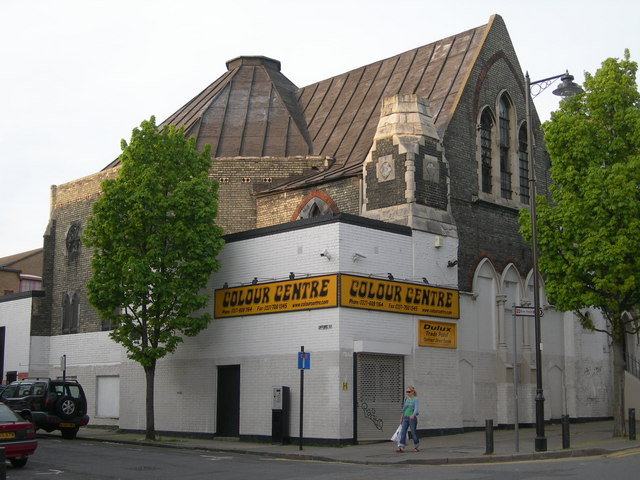
29A Offord Road, built as a church, now converted into a decorating supplies centre.

- List of people from Islington
- Islington Museum
- Islington Studios
- Islington Local History Centre
- Almeida Theatre
- Little Angel Theatre
- Business Design Centre
- Crafts Council
- Highbury Fields
- Islington Green
- Islington Libraries
- Market Estate
- The Union Chapel
- St James' Church, Islington
- The Bomb Factory Art Foundation
