= Islington Green War Memorial =

War memorial in London

- United Kingdom
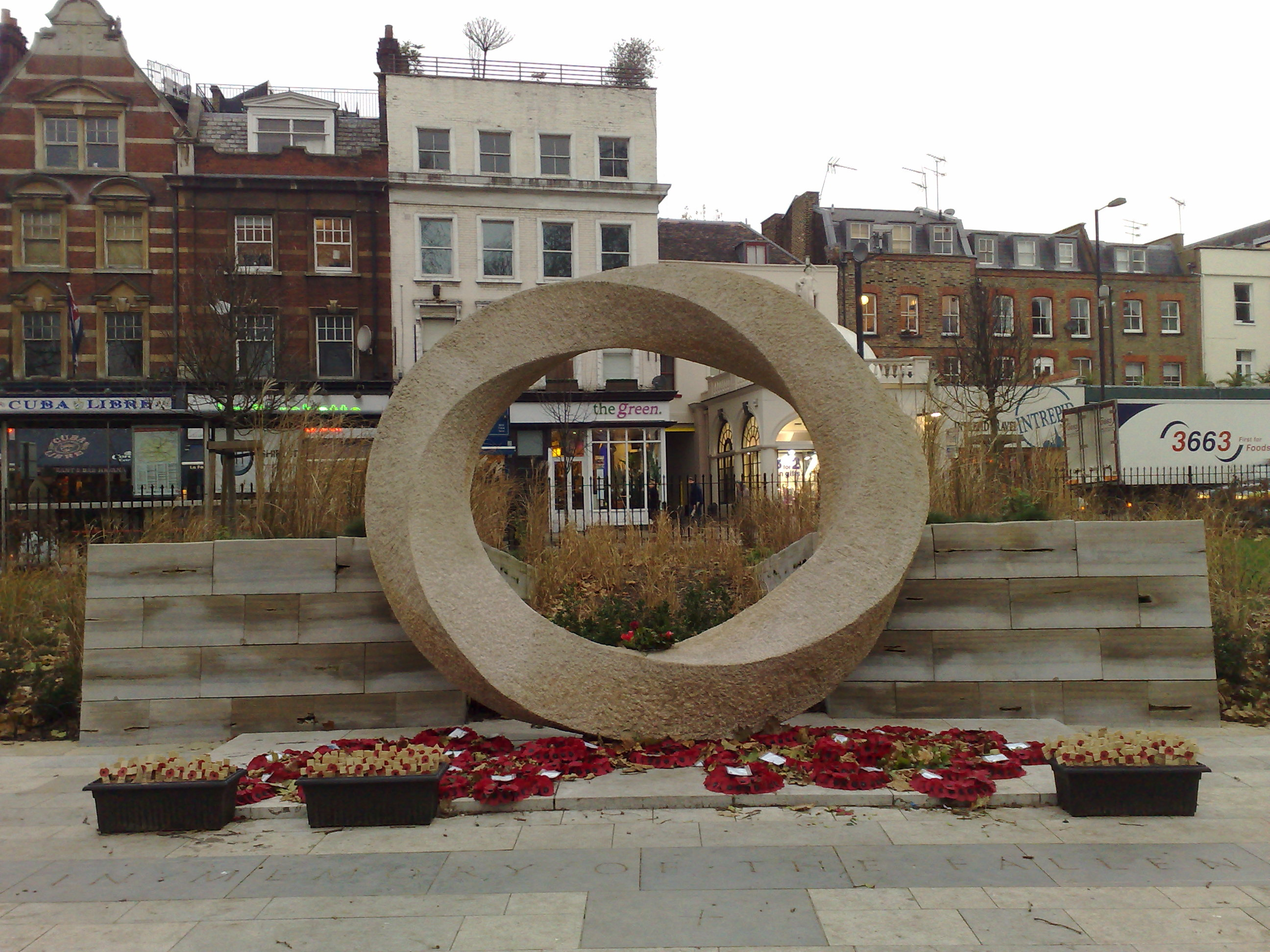
- The memorial in 2008
- For casualties of the First World War
- Unveiled: 2007; 19 years ago
- Location: 51.536188°N 0.103312°W; Islington, London
- Designed by: John Maine

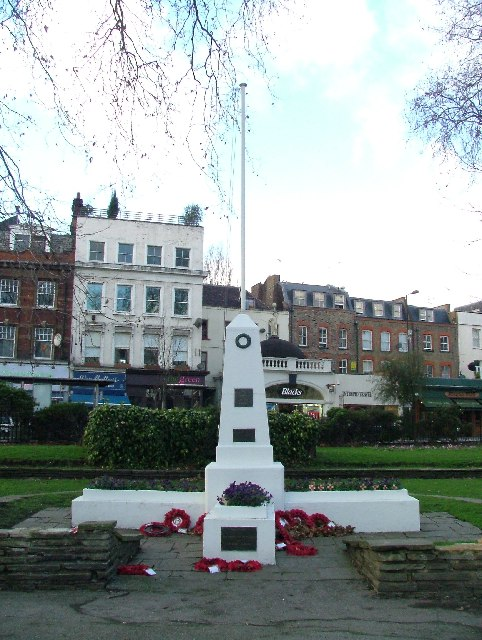
The old memorial, in 2005

The Islington Green War Memorial is a war memorial located at Islington Green in the London Borough of Islington.

A "temporary" memorial was erected at the site in 1918 by Charles Higham. The original memorial consisted of a painted concrete obelisk, with bronze plaques and wreath, and concrete flower boxes to either side. After the council proposed landscaping work at Islington Green, it became clear in 2004 that the old memorial needed to be replaced, and it was demolished in 2006.

A new memorial was completed in 2007, designed by artist John Maine. His proposal for a twisted stone ring, reminiscent of a wreath, was accepted by a memorial commission, which included representatives from the local Royal British Legion, the Canonbury Society, and representatives from the council.

The stone for the new memorial was sourced from Fujian province in eastern China, and the 8 tonnes (8.8 tons) ring was carved in China before being shipped to England. An inscription on a nearby slab repeats the words from the original memorial, "In Memory of the Fallen"; separate slabs bear the words "Land", "Sea", "Air" and "Home". The project cost £490,000, of which the stone for the memorial, and the apron and walls, cost approximately £100,000.

Remedial work was required in 2013 after the new memorial started to sink because its foundations were inadequate.

== See also ==
- 2007 in art

== In popular culture ==
- The memorial features in the children's book Gaspard's Foxtrot by local author Zeb Soanes, illustrated by James Mayhew and is referenced in the composer Jonathan Dove's orchestral adaptation of the story.
