= Samuel Morris =

Samuel, Sam or Sammy Morris may refer to:

== Sportspeople ==
- Samuel James Morris (1842–1909), English footballer, businessman and engineer
- Sam Morris (cricketer) (1855–1931), Australian cricketer
- Sam Morris (footballer, born 1930) (1930–2014), English football player for Chester City
- Sam Morris (footballer, born 1907) (1907–1991), English football player for Sunderland
- Sam Morris (footballer, born 1886) (1886–1969), English football player for Bristol Rovers and Brentford
- Sammy Morris (born 1977), American football player
- Samuel Morris (footballer) (1870–1935), Spanish football player for Barcelona

== Others ==
- Samuel Morris (merchant) (1711–1782), Philadelphia businessman in the era of the American Revolution
- Samuel Morris (soldier) (1734–1812), officer from Philadelphia in the American Revolutionary War
- Samuel W. Morris (1786–1847), United States congressman from Pennsylvania
- Samuel Morris (Pennsylvania politician) (1918–1995), 20th-century Pennsylvania politician
- Samuel Morris (Irish politician) (1846–1920), MP for South Kilkenny, 1894–1900
- Samuel Kaboo Morris (1873–1893), African prince who attended Taylor University
- Sam Morris (activist) (1908–1976), anti-colonial activist from Grenada
- Sam Morris (businessman) (1917–1991), British businessman
- Samuel B. Morris, chief engineer and namesake of the Morris Dam in Pasadena, California

== See also ==
- Samuel Morison (disambiguation)
