= Large Black =

British breed of domestic pig

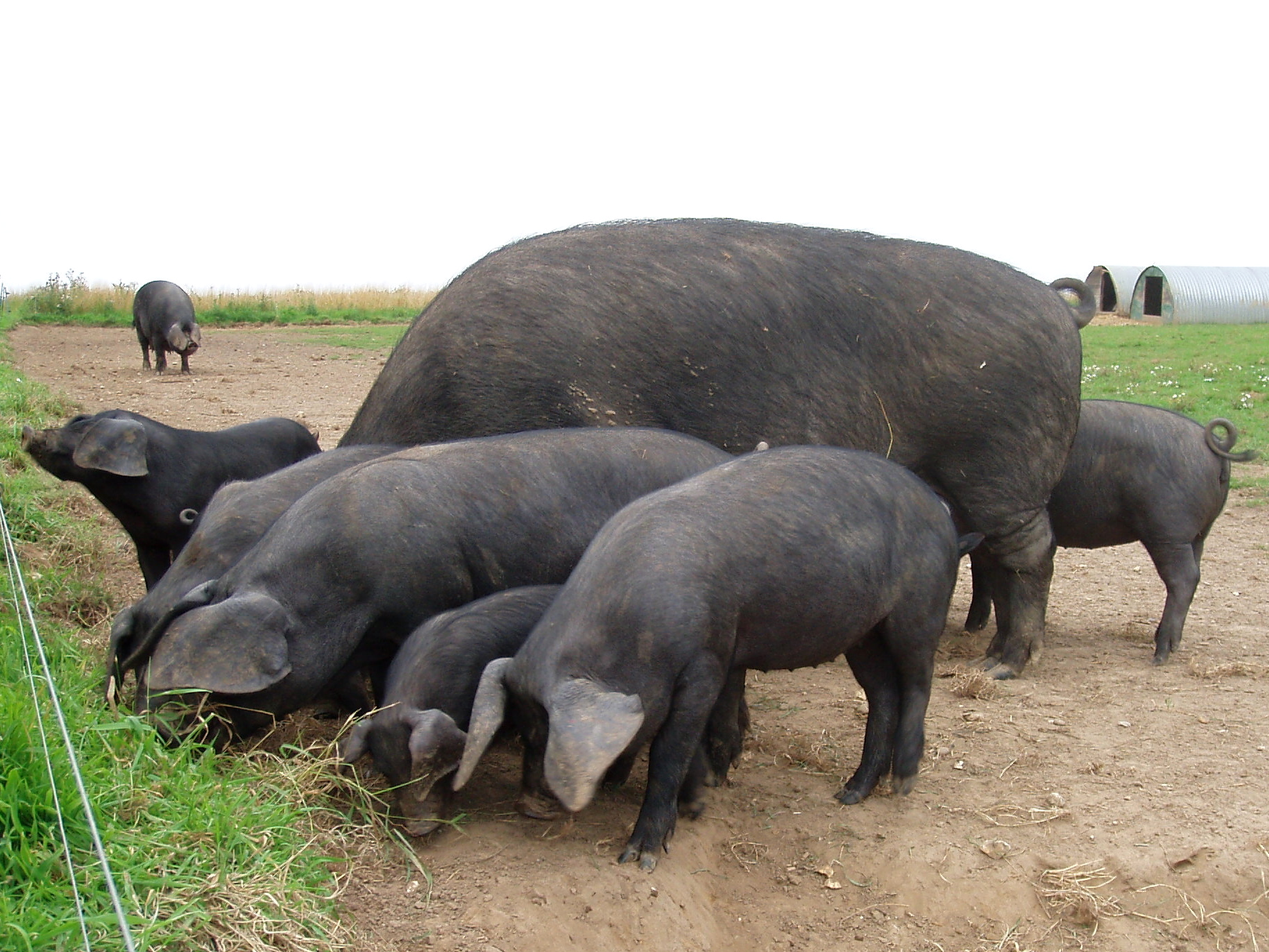
- Sow with piglets

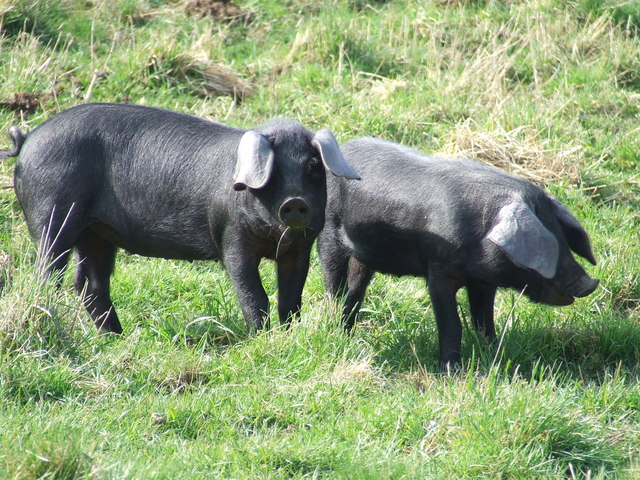
- Conservation status: RBST (2019): endangered
- Other names: Large Black pig; Devon pig; Cornwall Black; Large English Black pig; English Black; English Large Black; Large Black hog
- Country of origin: United Kingdom

Traits
- Weight: Male: 306 kg; Female: 250 kg
- Height: Male: 100 cm; Female: 90 cm
- Skin colour: blue-black
- Hair colour: black

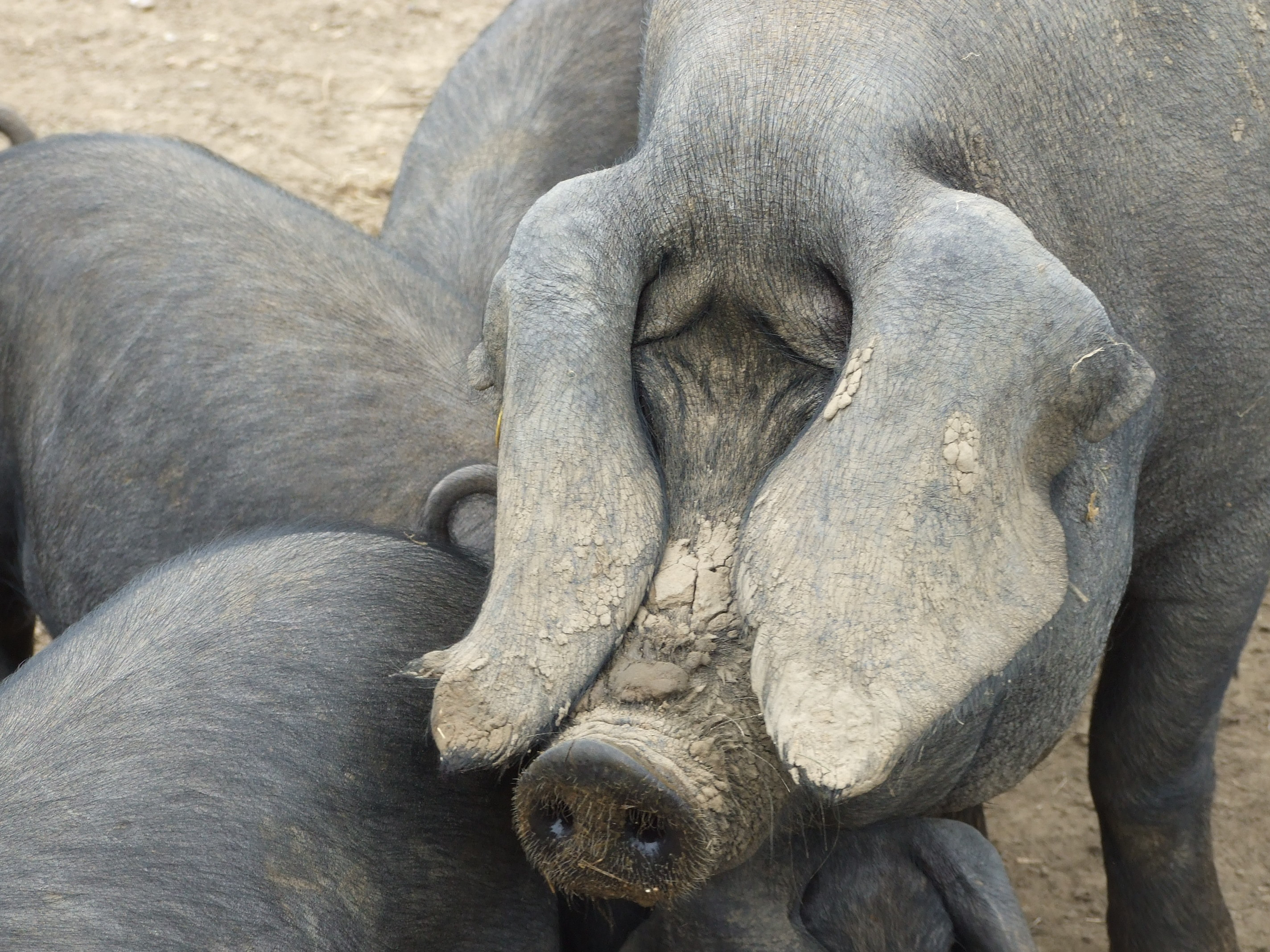
The ears may fall over the eyes

The Large Black is a British breed of domestic pig. It is the only British pig that is entirely black. It was created in the last years of the nineteenth century by merging the black pig populations of Devon and Cornwall in the south-west with those of Essex, Suffolk and Kent in the south-east. It is hardy, docile and prolific; it forages well and is suitable for extensive farming, but not well suited to intensive management.

It was a successful breed in the early twentieth century and was exported to many areas of the world. Population numbers declined after the Second World War, when the Howitt Report discouraged rearing of all but three pig breeds suitable for intensive pig farming. By the 1960s the breed was almost extinct. Although numbers have since risen, it is still an endangered breed.

== History ==
The Large Black resulted from the amalgamation of black pigs from two geographically separate areas, Devon and Cornwall in the south-west of England, and Essex, Suffolk and Kent in the east. The pigs from eastern England, mainly Essex, were influenced by importations from China in the late 18th century, while those from Devon and Cornwall were probably more closely related to the pigs in mainland Europe, particularly France. The Devon pigs were originally selected for "the length of their bodies, ears, noses, tail and hair, the longer the better, without reference to quality or substance", but selective breeding brought improvements to the breed, and by 1850 the type was small-boned and thick-bodied, with good conformation and constitution. Alternative origins proposed for the black colour of the breed are black Guinea hogs imported from Africa (similar to the Guinea Hog of the US) or from Neapolitan pigs.

During the late nineteenth century, the Large Black grew in popularity. A breed association, the Large Black Pig Society, was formed in 1898 or 1899, in Ipswich, in Suffolk. A trademark, consisting of the letters LBP within a shield, was registered in 1902.

The Herd Book of Large Black Pigs was first published in 1899. In it the black pigs of Devon and Cornwall were combined under one name with the remnants of the smaller Black Essex, Black Suffolk or Small Black, and other black East Anglian breeds whose numbers had fallen below sustainable levels. There were considerable variations between the types in the two areas, but breeding stock was exchanged between them and by 1913 "general uniformity" had been achieved.

In 1919 a Large Black sow was supreme champion at the Smithfield Show in the Agricultural Hall in Islington, and at the Royal Show that year 121 Large Blacks were entered, more than of any other breed. Breed numbers peaked in the 1920s, and fell further after the Second World War as farmers turned to pigs better suited to intensive indoor farming. The breed association was merged with the National Pig Breeders Association (later the British Pig Association) in 1949.

In 1955 the Howitt report on the development of pig production in the United Kingdom was published. Its main conclusions were that pig farms were poorly placed to compete with European producers, that the diversity of local breeds was an obstacle to progress, and that British pig farmers should focus on three breeds only: the Welsh, the British Landrace, and the Large White. The report initiated a period of decline in all other British pig breeds, including the Large Black. By the time the Rare Breeds Survival Trust was founded in 1973, numbers of all traditional breeds of pig were dangerously low, and many of them were extinct; the Large Black was listed as endangered.

=== In other countries ===
By 1913 the Large Black had been exported to many parts of mainland Europe and to North and South America, Africa and Oceania. In the twenty-first century it is reported to DAD-IS by fourteen countries: Argentina, Antigua and Barbuda, Australia, Brazil, Bhutan, Canada, the Democratic Republic of the Congo, the Republic of Korea, Saint Lucia, New Zealand, the Russian Federation, Rwanda, Ukraine and the United States. The only substantial population is in Argentina, where the total number is estimated at between 3815 and 4500.

The first exports to Australia were in 1902 or 1903, with the Large Black being chosen over the Berkshire pig because of their ability to thrive in hot weather, their foraging abilities and their fecundity. By 1930, Large Blacks represented only 1 percent of Australian pig population, and were raised mainly by breeders in Victoria, South Australia and Tasmania. The breed population continued to hover around 1 percent of the total population, with a slight increase after the Second World War and a decrease to almost zero new registrations in the 1980s. The first exports to the US were in the 1920s, but the population in that country dwindled to the point where imports were again necessary in 1985.

== Characteristics ==
The Large Black is a long, deep-bodied pig; it is hardy and forages well, so is suitable for extensive farming. It is entirely black, with black hair and blue-black skin, the only all-black British pig; the black skin can give some protection from the sun in tropical climates. The Large Black is a docile breed and is easily contained by fencing. This is partly because its large, drooping ears obscure its vision, although they also help to protect the face and eyes while the animal is foraging, especially when rooting for food.

Sows are fertile and have a strong maternal instinct. They usually farrow a litter of 8–10 piglets, but may have up to 13. One sow farrowed 26 litters between 1940 and 1952, the largest number recorded for a pig. Average body weights are approximately 250 kg for sows and about 306 kg for boars; the corresponding heights at the shoulder are roughly 90 cm and 100 cm respectively. Obesity in sows may result in cystic ovaries and a loss of fertility. In the early 1900s, weights averaged 230 kg (500 lb) for sows.

The Large Black was reared for its meat – which is lean and well-flavoured – and especially for bacon. In commercial production it was often crossed with the Yorkshire and Middle White, producing a vigorous hybrid.

== Conservation status ==
In 1954 there were 2195 Large Blacks recorded, 269 licensed boars and 1926 registered sows, representing approximately 3.4% of the UK pig population of about 65,000; at the end of 2011 there were 421 registered (86 boars and 335 sows), a small increase over the 2010 figure of 405 (65 boars, 340 sows). The Large Black is the rarest historic pig breed in Britain, although numbers are slowly on the rise due to an increase in demand for meat from traditional pig breeds. In 2011 it was classified as "vulnerable" on the watchlist of the Rare Breeds Survival Trust, meaning that there are believed to be between 200 and 300 breeding females. The British Pig Association recognises 6 boar lines and 24 sow lines within the breed.

In 2004 the Rare Breeds Trust of Australia listed the status of the Large Black as "critical", meaning that sow registrations in the Australian Pure Bred Pig Herd Book of the Australian Pig Breeders Association were fewer than 30 per year.

The American Livestock Breeds Conservancy estimated the Large Black population of the United States at 300 breeding hogs in 2008, and lists its status as "critical", which means that fewer than 200 animals are registered each year in the United States, and there are estimated to be fewer than 2,000 worldwide. The US Large Black population was around 300 in 2008. Besides conservation for the sake of genetic diversity in livestock, the breed is also coming to be seen as a good option for fulfilling the needs of an increasing number of consumers interested in pasture-raised pork. Rare Breeds Canada identified the single remaining Canadian herd in 1997, and has since included the breed on its conservation watchlist as "endangered", with fewer than 500 of the animals in that country.
