= Samuel Morrison =

Samuel Morrison may refer to:

- Samuel Morrison (taekwondo) (born 1990), Filipino taekwondo practitioner
- Samuel C. Morrison Jr. (born 1982), Liberian-born screenwriter, director, producer and journalist
- Samuel F. Morrison (born 1936), American librarian
- Samuel Morrison (bishop), Chilean bishop

== See also ==
- Sam Morrison, American jazz saxophonist
- Sunshine Sammy Morrison (1912–1989), American child actor
- Samuel Morison (disambiguation)
