= Small Black pig =

Breed of pig

Small Black
- Two Small Black pigs, champions at the Smithfield Show
- Conservation status: extinct
- Other names: Suffolk
- Country of origin: United Kingdom

Traits

The Small Black or Suffolk pig was a breed of domestic pig originating in the United Kingdom during the nineteenth century. It is now extinct.

== History ==
The origin of the breed is uncertain, but it was thought to have been created through crosses of the Essex pig with foreign breeds in efforts to 'improve' it. A herd of Neapolitan pigs belonging to Lord Western may have contributed to its makeup, with much breeding work being carried out by Thomas Crisp of Butley Abbey, Wickham Market, in the mid 19th century. The Small Black was said to closely resemble the Small White, originally a Yorkshire breed, with the exception of the colour; like the Small White, its pricked ears, small size and short upturned snout indicated a contribution to the breed from imported Chinese pigs.

The Small Black was also often known as the Suffolk, Improved Suffolk or Black Suffolk, although an earlier and unrelated small white breed of pig had also been known as the Suffolk.

The Small Black seems to have had a rather mixed reputation amongst agriculturalists. By the turn of the 20th century it was dropping rapidly out of favour, and the breed was said to have "a delicate constitution" and "a too large percentage of fat", although it matured early.

The breed appears to have disappeared in the early 20th century, when it was eventually merged into the Large Black.
