= St Mary Magdalene Academy =

Location
- Liverpool Road; Islington, London, N7 8PG; England
- Coordinates: 51°32′50″N 0°06′36″W

Information
- Type: Academy
- Motto: "Show by a good life that your works are done by gentleness born of wisdom." (James 3:13)
- Religious affiliation: Church of England
- Department for Education URN: 134314 Tables
- Ofsted: Reports
- Chair of Governing Body: A Caspari
- Headteacher: V Linsley
- Gender: Co-educational
- Age: 4 to 19
- Houses: Africa, Americas, Asia and Europe
- Colours: Blue and Grey. House ties: Red, Green, Silver, Gold
- Website: http://www.smmacademy.org/

St Mary Magdalene Academy is an academy on Liverpool Road, London.

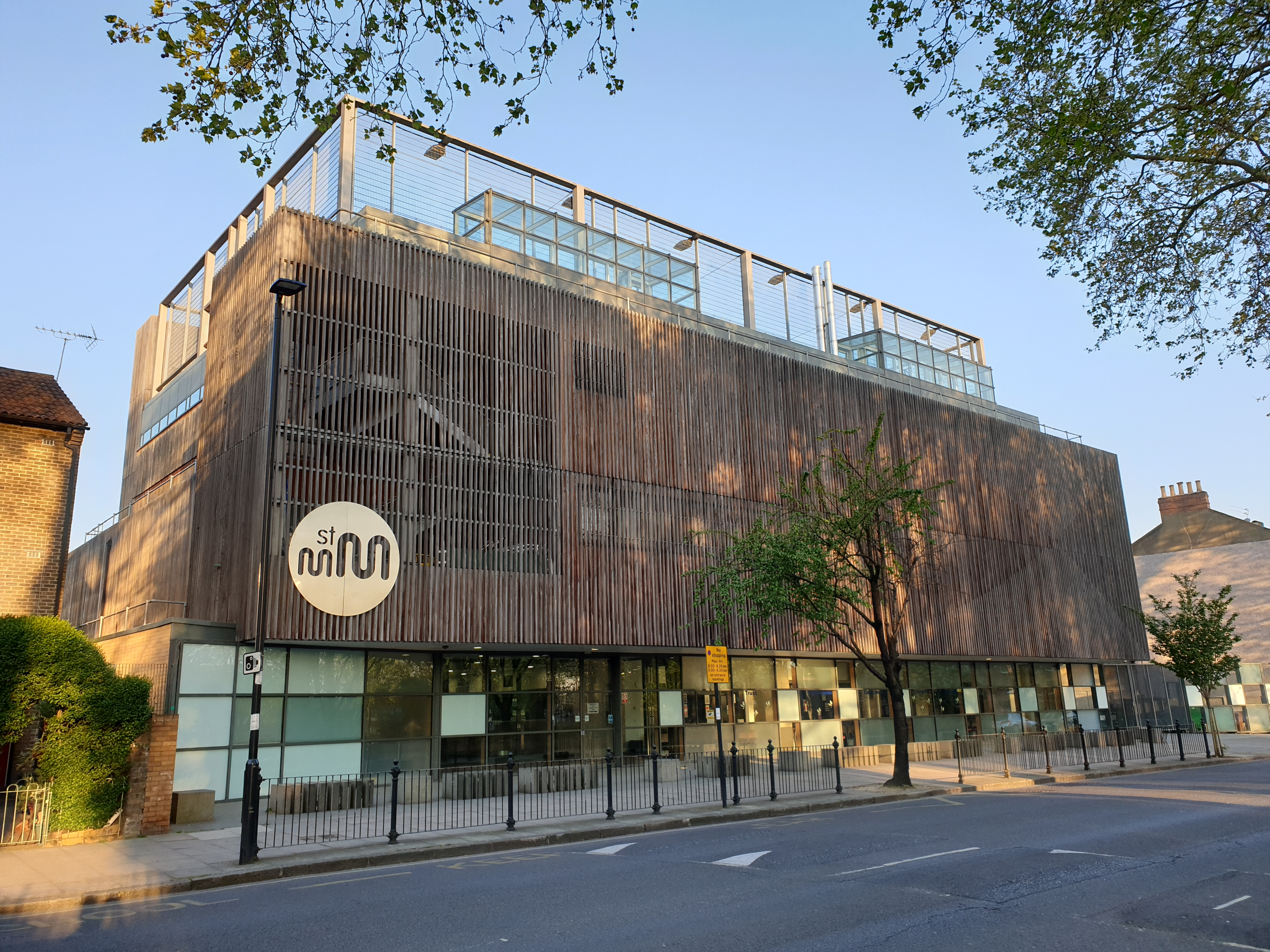
St Mary Magdalene Academy

St Mary Magdalene Academy opened in 2007 and over the past decade has established itself as a high achieving North London school. Examination Results are consistently strong at GCSE and A Level.

The buildings were designed by architects Feilden Clegg Bradley Studios working with structural, mechanical, electrical and civil engineers Buro Happold and Churchman Landscape Architects now Churchman Thornhill Finch. The main contractor was Mace Plus, a division of Mace. The buildings won an RIBA National award in 2009.
