= George Darnell =

Schoolmaster whose educational writings were widely read

George Darnell (1 January 1799 - 26 February 1857) was a schoolmaster whose educational writings were widely read, with Darnell's Copybooks becoming a household name.

== Biography ==
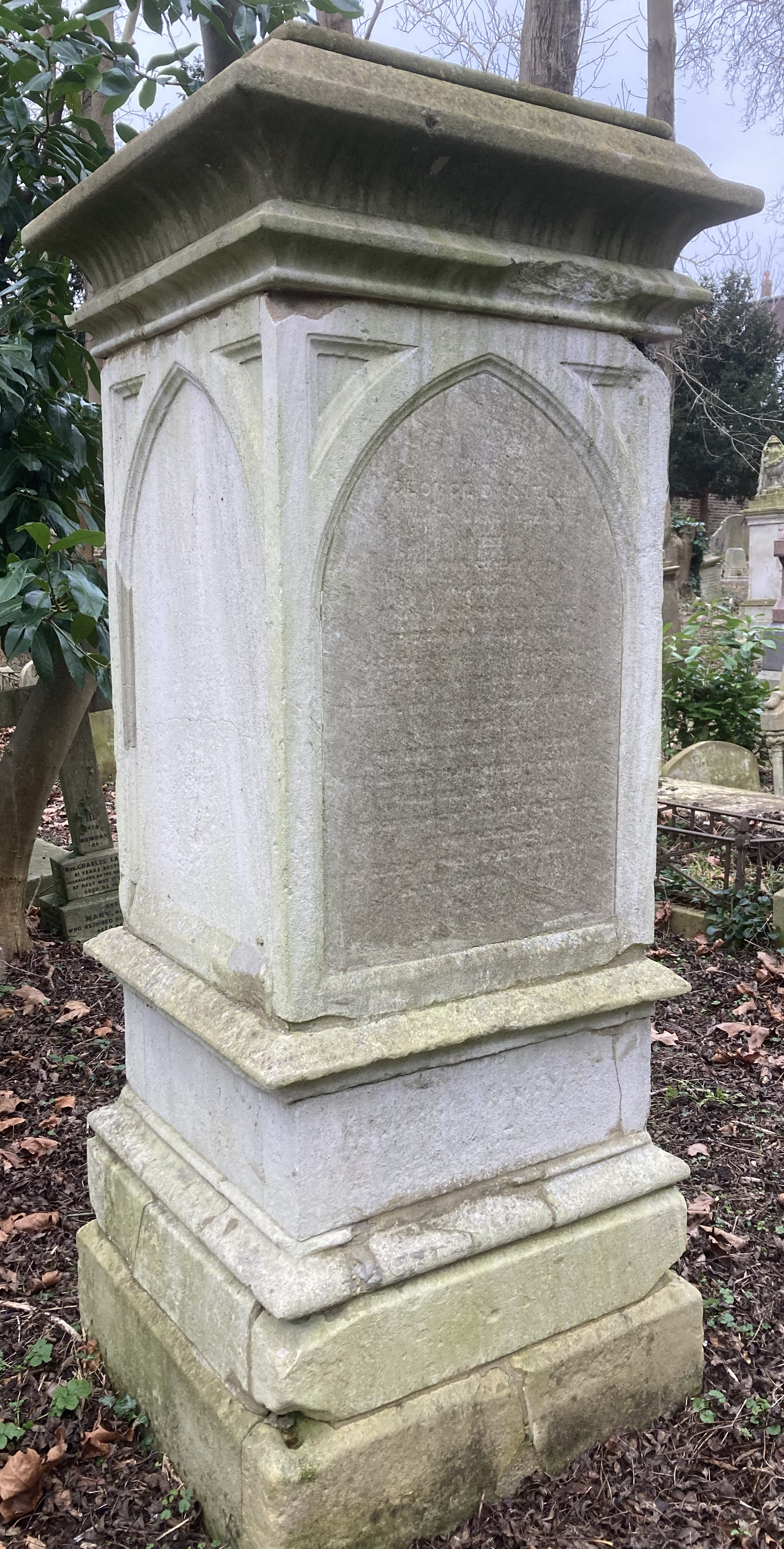
Grave of George Darnell in Highgate Cemetery

Darnell was born on 1 December 1799 at Market Bosworth, Leicestershire, the eldest son of John Darnell (Miller) and his wife Mary, formerly Mary Holloway.

After running a preparatory school at Market Harborough he came to London and established, and conducted for many years, a large classical day school in Islington. Though physically weak he was a shrewd and caring man whose publications aimed to make preparatory schooling less daunting for pupils.

His series of Copybooks were widely used for many years in elementary schools, and Darnell's Copybooks became a household name from their introduction in the 1840s. The books were widely imitated, but he was the first to introduce the concept of giving a line of copy in pale ink, to be first written over by the pupil, then to be copied in the next blank line.

His educational writings included A Short and Certain Road to Reading (1845), Grammar Made Intelligible to Children (1846), and Arithmetic Made Intelligible to Children (1855), which for many years had an enormous sale. The prefaces to these short works contained innovative practical suggestions for teachers, which came to be widely adopted.

Darnell, who was unmarried, died at his home, 70 Gibson Square, Islington, on 26 February 1857, aged fifty-eight, and was buried on the west side of Highgate Cemetery. The epitaph on his grave reads:

In memory of George Darnell; For thirty years principal of the Theberton School, Islington; A most skilful and loving instructor of the young; A zealous friend to the cause of popular education; Author of several works designed to render easy the beginning of knowledge; His earthly life, marked by active goodwill towards men, by generosity and self-sacrifice ended serenely on the 26th day of February 1857 in the 59th year of his age. Reader, so live; that - by God's grace - so thou mayst die.
