= Arundel Square =

Garden square in Barnsbury, London, England

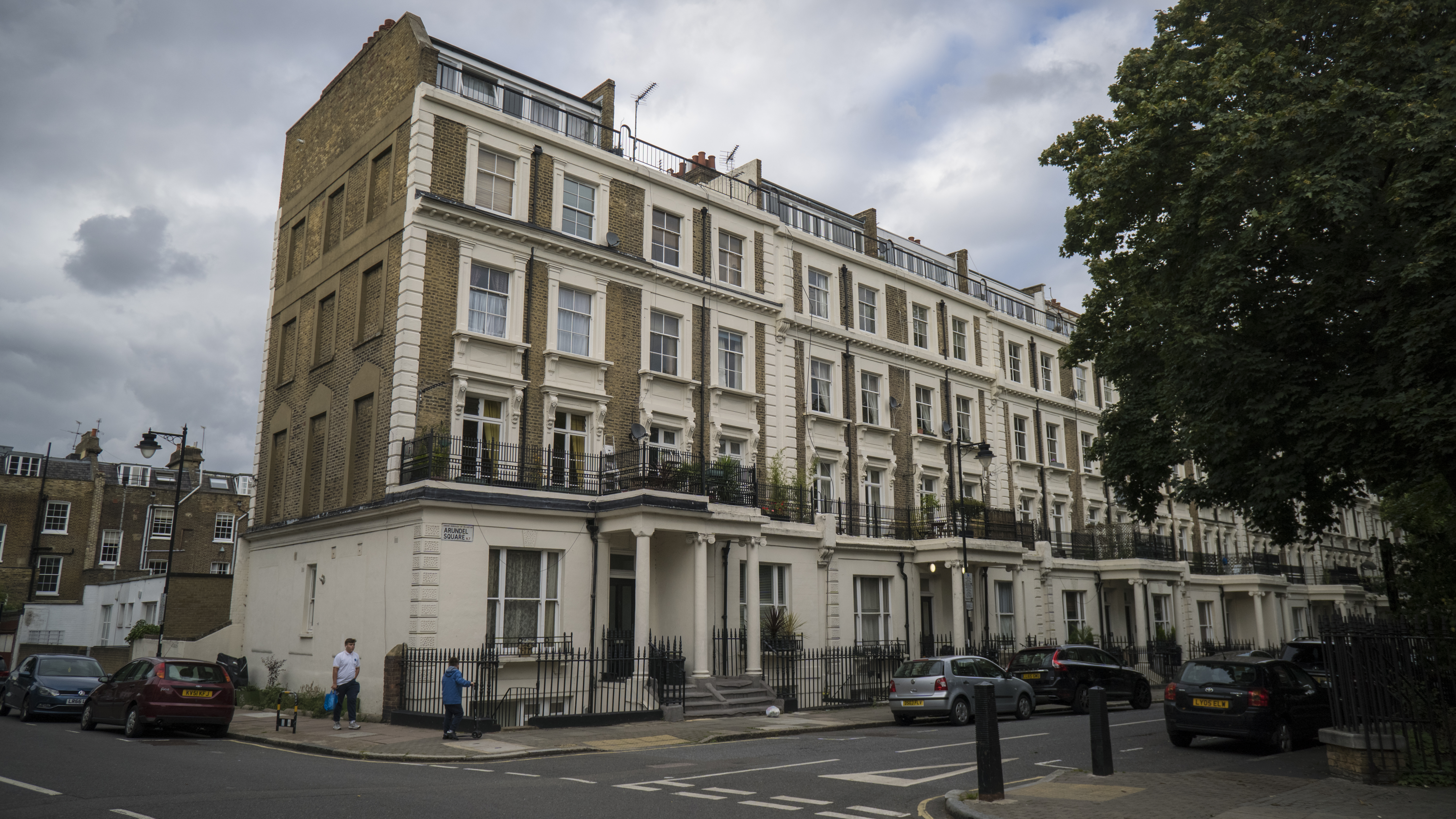
- Arundel Square, north-west corner

- Location within London Borough of Islington
- Postal code: N7
- Coordinates: 51.5444959°N 0.11018°W

Construction
- Construction start: 1850
- Completion: 1860

Arundel Square is a garden square in Barnsbury, North London. It is bounded on three sides by terraces of Victorian houses, and on the fourth with modern flats. The central public gardens contain mature trees, attractive flower beds and playground equipment.

== History ==
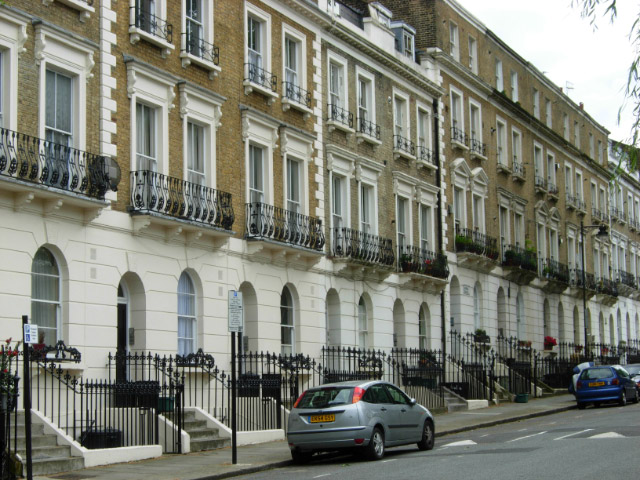
Arundel Square, east side

The square was built on Pocock's Fields, dairy grassland belonging to Richard Pocock, in 1826 measuring 14 acres (5.7 ha). In 1841, his son Samuel owned all the open land between the Back Road (now Liverpool Road) and the then-new Pentonville Prison.

Arundel Square was one of the last of Islington's Victorian squares to be built. Piecemeal building began in 1850, with the east side of the square completed in 1852, and the north side in 1855–60. The west side, completed in the late 1850s-1860, is really part of Westbourne Road. Money seems to have run out and the south side of the square was not built, instead being completed by a deep railway cutting for the North London Railway.

In 1856 a boys' day school was established at no. 45 Ellington Street, Arundel Square, offering classical, mathematical, and commercial subjects. A girls' school was connected with it in 1879.

The central gardens were originally maintained by Pocock's trustees as open space, and then from 1863 by a residents’ committee.

In the 1870s, the square was respectable, with clergymen and an architect living there. A ladies’ school was kept at no. 59 by the Misses Ann and Emma Sarah Walls. By Edwardian times, the smarter north side supposedly housed the mistresses of City gentlemen.

Charles Booth’s poverty map of c.1890 shows Arundel Square households as “Middle-class. Well to-do”, and those of Westbourne Road as "Fairly comfortable. Good ordinary earnings". However, as the 20th century progressed the area deteriorated, like much of Islington.

Playground equipment was installed in the central gardens in 1936, with funding from the National Air Raid Distress Fund and the King George's Fields Foundation.

By the 1950s the square had become run down and the gardens a wasteland. In October 1955 Islington Council purchased the square using compulsory purchase orders. In 1957, 14 of the properties on the north side were sold to Circle 33 Housing Trust. In the same year the gardens were converted into a public park with a refurbished playground.

In 1970 the square was designated as part of a conservation area. As Islington became newly fashionable as part of gentrification in the 1960s and 1970s, many of the freeholds were privately purchased by occupants and the houses were rehabilitated. Many houses have been converted to flats and maisonettes.

The incomplete south side of the square was finally completed in 2010 with a modern housing development, constructed on decking over the railway cutting. At the same time the park was significantly extended and improved.

== Description ==
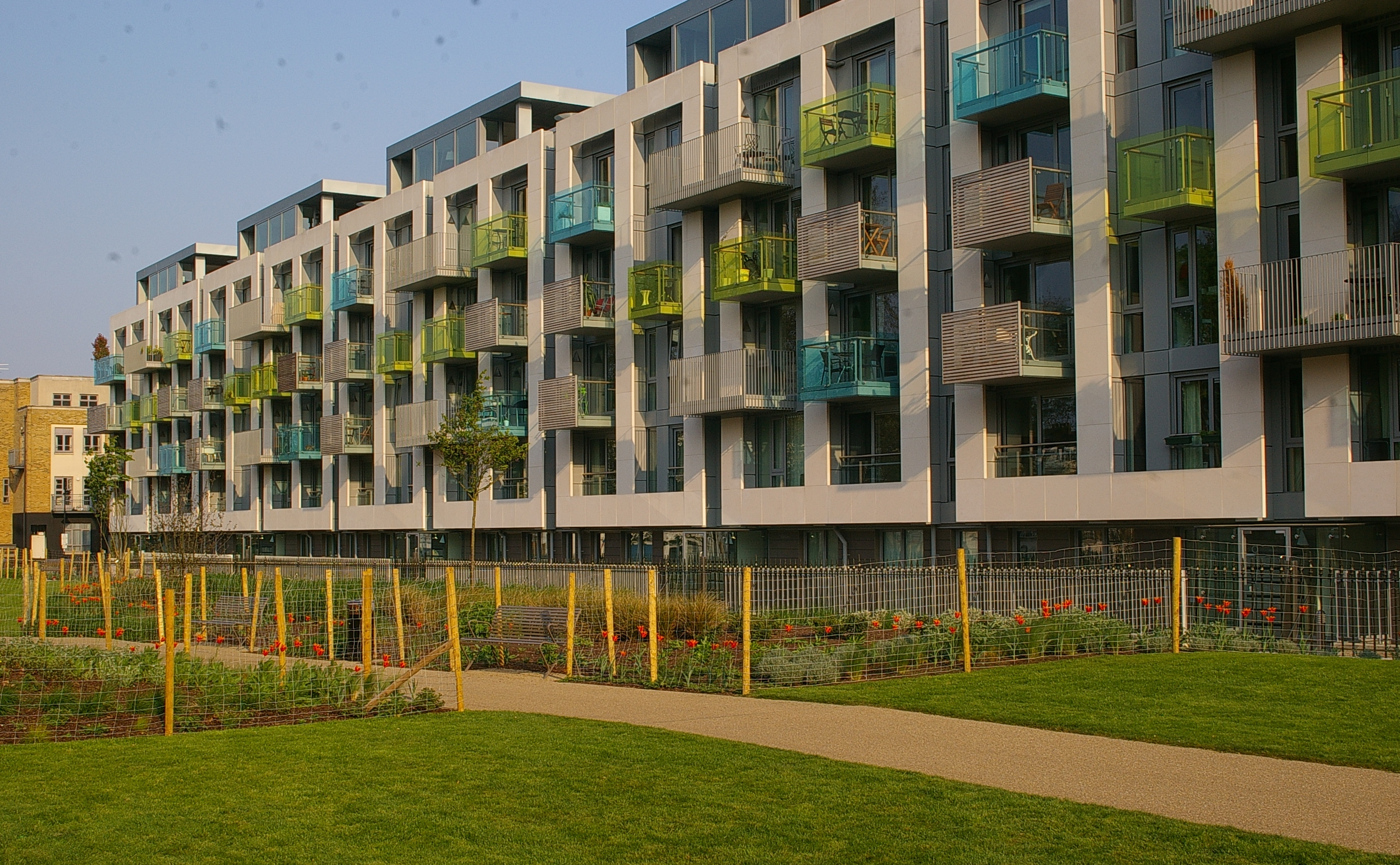
The modern housing development, built over the railway cutting

The east side of the square is an orthodox early/mid-Victorian terrace of tall houses. Nos. 16-17 were demolished in 1867 to accommodate the route of the railway. No. 16 was rebuilt in a similar style in 1984.

The north side houses are exceptionally tall for Islington of that date, with four floors and basement, porches with Ionic columns, and double porticos. The entrance to the central public gardens opposite no. 22 is marked by King George's Fields stone heraldic panels, indicating that it is one of the parks and green spaces protected in perpetuity by the Fields in Trust charity.

The west side houses are architecturally part of Westbourne Road.

The modern south side was designed by architectural firm Pollard Thomas Edwards, and the development was the winner of the Housing Design Project Award 2004, Daily Telegraph British Homes Award 2010, Housing Design Award 2011, Building Award 2011, New London Award 2012, and commended in several other competitions.
