= Gibson Square =

Garden square in London

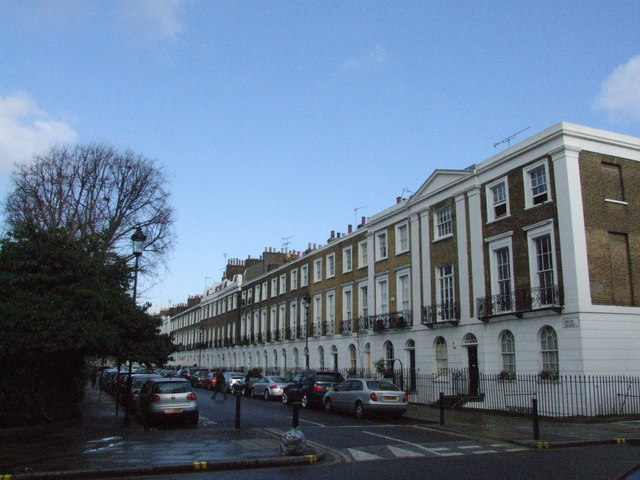
- Gibson Square - east side

- Location within London Borough of Islington
- Postal code: N1
- Coordinates: 51.53815°N 0.105631°W

Construction
- Construction start: 1836
- Completed: 1839

Gibson Square is a garden square in the Barnsbury district of Islington, North London. It is bounded by Regency and Victorian terraced houses, most of which are listed buildings. The central public gardens contain flower beds and mature trees, and an unusual building resembling a classical temple.

== History ==
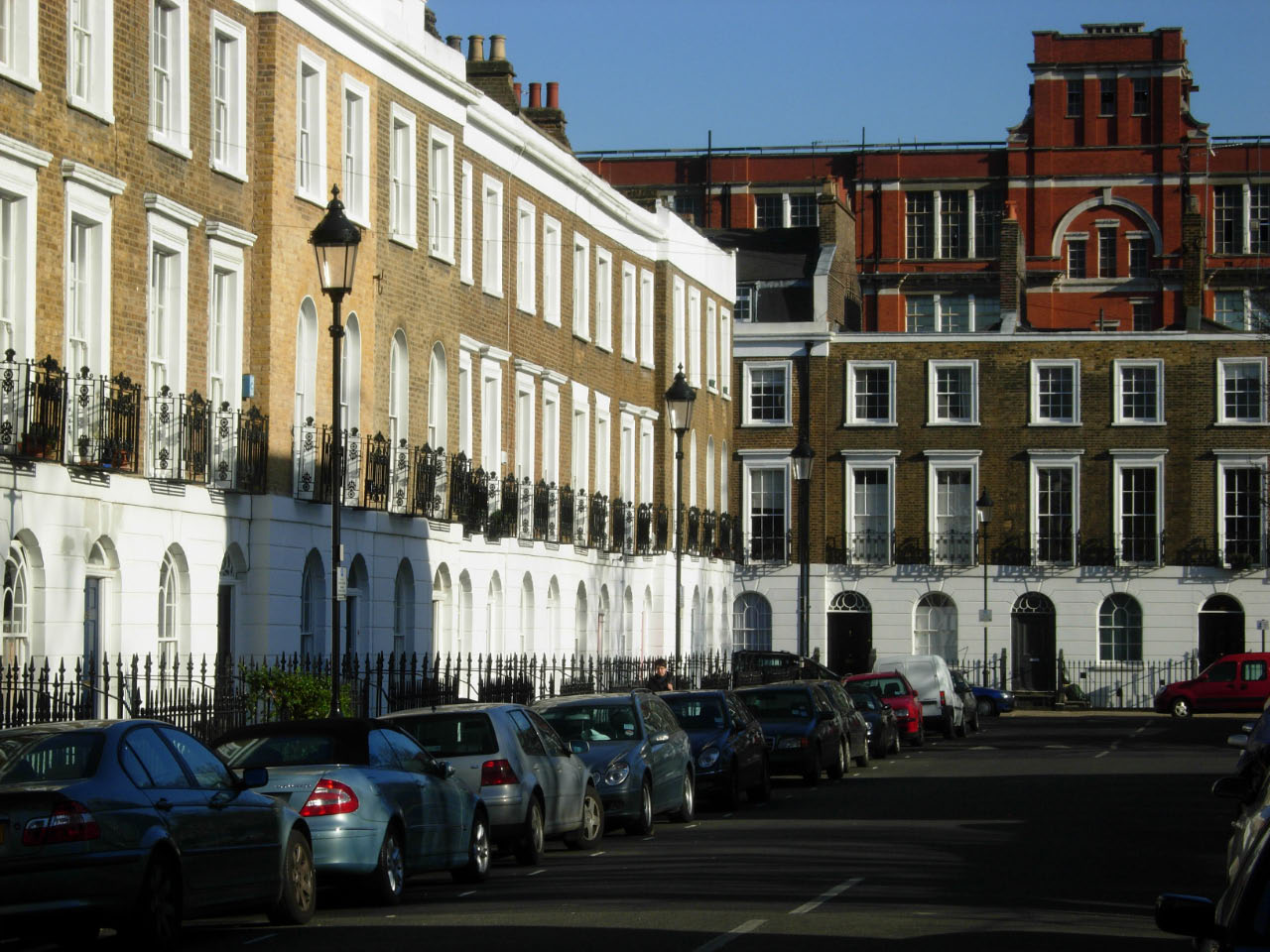
Gibson Square - west and north sides

Thomas Milner Gibson was a member of parliament, President of the Board of Trade, supporter of the free-trade movement and a leading anti-Corn Laws orator. In 1823 Milner Gibson leased land in Islington from local landowner William Tufnell, and his estate surveyor and architect Francis Edwards laid out an estate between 1828 and 1846. The plot formed Theberton Street, the two neighbouring squares Gibson Square and Milner Square, and some smaller streets. On Edwards' original plans "Milner Square" and "Gibson Square" were at that point reversed, and a map of 1830 shows the incomplete square as "Theberton Square". Theberton Street, which forms part of the south side of Gibson Square, was named after Milner Gibson's country house, Theberton House in Suffolk. Edwards designed the houses in Gibson Square and the south side of Theberton Street, and the square was built by Louis England, a local timber merchant.

The square was initially occupied by prosperous middle class tradesmen and professionals. As with much of Islington, in the middle and late 19th century Barnsbury was gradually abandoned by the middle classes who were replaced by poorer occupants. Starting in 1856, Islington's Medical Officer of Health Dr Edward Ballard published annual reports into public health in Islington, and noted unsanitary conditions in many locations with "mortality from tubercular diseases" and "zymotic mortality" in Gibson Square from 1857. Charles Booth’s poverty map of c.1890 still shows most Gibson Square households as “Fairly comfortable. Good ordinary earnings”.

In the first half of the 20th century the square, as with much of Islington and its population, became impoverished. Between the world wars and for some time afterwards, houses were tenemented by absentee landlords and often let in single rooms.

Starting about 1960 middle class and professional householders began returning to Islington, refurbishing houses which were once elegant but now, more often than not, were endowed with Victorian plumbing hardly suited for modern living. Journalists, architects, lawyers, accountants, teachers and designers were attracted by the style and size of the Regency and Victorian houses and squares and the opportunity to acquire large, characterful properties at prices they could afford, with easy access to the City of London, Westminster and the West End. Consequently, house values soon soared, a trend which has continued to the present.

== Description ==
Gibson Square has a distinctive appearance when compared to other Islington squares, with two identical long terraces east and west, facing each other, with pavilion blocks at the end of each. These terraces and the south (Theberton Street) terrace have central groups supporting a cornice, with the end groups having pediments and large, flat pilasters. The north terrace appears slightly shifted westwards, due to the north eastern exit road to Milner Square. In the north western exit, the corner building at the junction with Liverpool Road was burnt out in 1974, and replaced in 1988 by a new building with an Egyptian and Art Deco theme.

The square is largely unchanged since its original construction, and many houses retain original interior features such as simple fireplaces, shutters, pine half-panelling, and folding doors between the downstairs parlours.

== Gardens ==
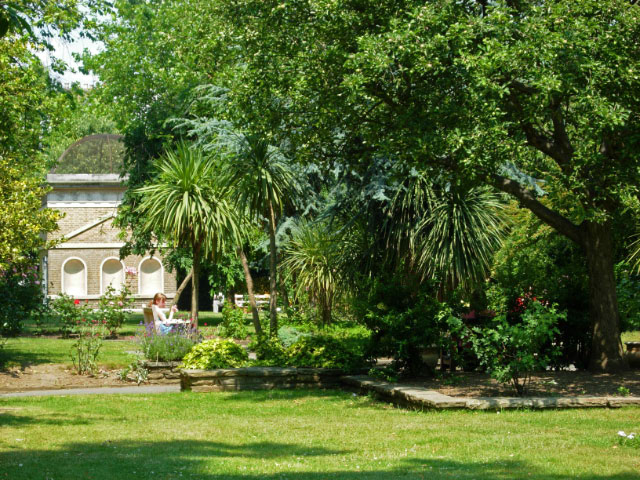
Central gardens, showing neo-classical temple ventilating tower for Victoria line

Originally, the central gardens were surrounded by railings with locked gates, open only to resident key-holders. In the 1930s, the residents handed over the run down gardens to Islington Council. During the Second World War the gardens were dug up for air-raid shelters but, post-war, they were restored and replanted. The Council now maintains them with the assistance of local volunteers. The gardens have a number of mature elm trees, some of the only ones left in the borough. The site is important for its geological interest, having Islington Terrace Gravels in flower beds.

In 1963, when London Transport was building the new Victoria line of the London Underground, Gibson Square gardens were earmarked for a ventilation shaft, with a 50 feet (15 m) high ventilation tower clad in exposed aggregate concrete panels. The new, articulate, and well-organised owner-occupiers formed a society to fight the proposal, and after a lengthy campaign and with the support of Sir Basil Spence and Sir William Holford amongst others, the design was modified until the current solution was accepted. This is a neoclassical brick structure, with a pedimented temple front with niches and a dome-like mesh roof. It was designed by Raymond Erith, with Quinlan Terry. London Transport also restored the gardens, repaved the paths with York stone slabs, and replaced the chicken wire fencing with metal railings.

== Notable residents ==
- Robert Carrier (1923–2006), restaurateur and cookery writer, whose eponymous restaurant Carrier's was in nearby Camden Passage from 1966 to 1984.
- Thomas Edlyne Tomlins (1803–1875) (1803–1875, legal writer, author of Yseldon, a Perambulation of Islington and its Environs (1858)
- Samuel Maunder (1785-1849), writer
- Angus McBean (1904-1990, photographer
- George Darnell (1798-1857), designer of copy books and school books to make schooling easier for pupils and teachers
