= Sam Morris (footballer, born 1907) =

English footballer

Personal information
- Full name: Samuel Walker Morris
- Date of birth: 16 April 1907
- Place of birth: Prescot, England
- Date of death: 10 August 1991 (aged 84)
- Place of death: Nuneaton, England
- Height: 5 ft 11 in (1.80 m)
- Position: Wing half

Senior career*
Years	Team	Apps	(Gls)
1927–1928	Prescot Cables		
1928–1932	Sunderland	59	(0)
1932–1933	Charlton Athletic	12	(0)
1933–1934	Chester	5	(0)
1934–1935	Bath City		
1935–193?	Weymouth		
- * Club domestic league appearances and goals

Samuel Walker Morris (16 April 1907 – 10 August 1991) was an English professional footballer who played as a wing half for Sunderland.
