= Sam Morris (businessman) =

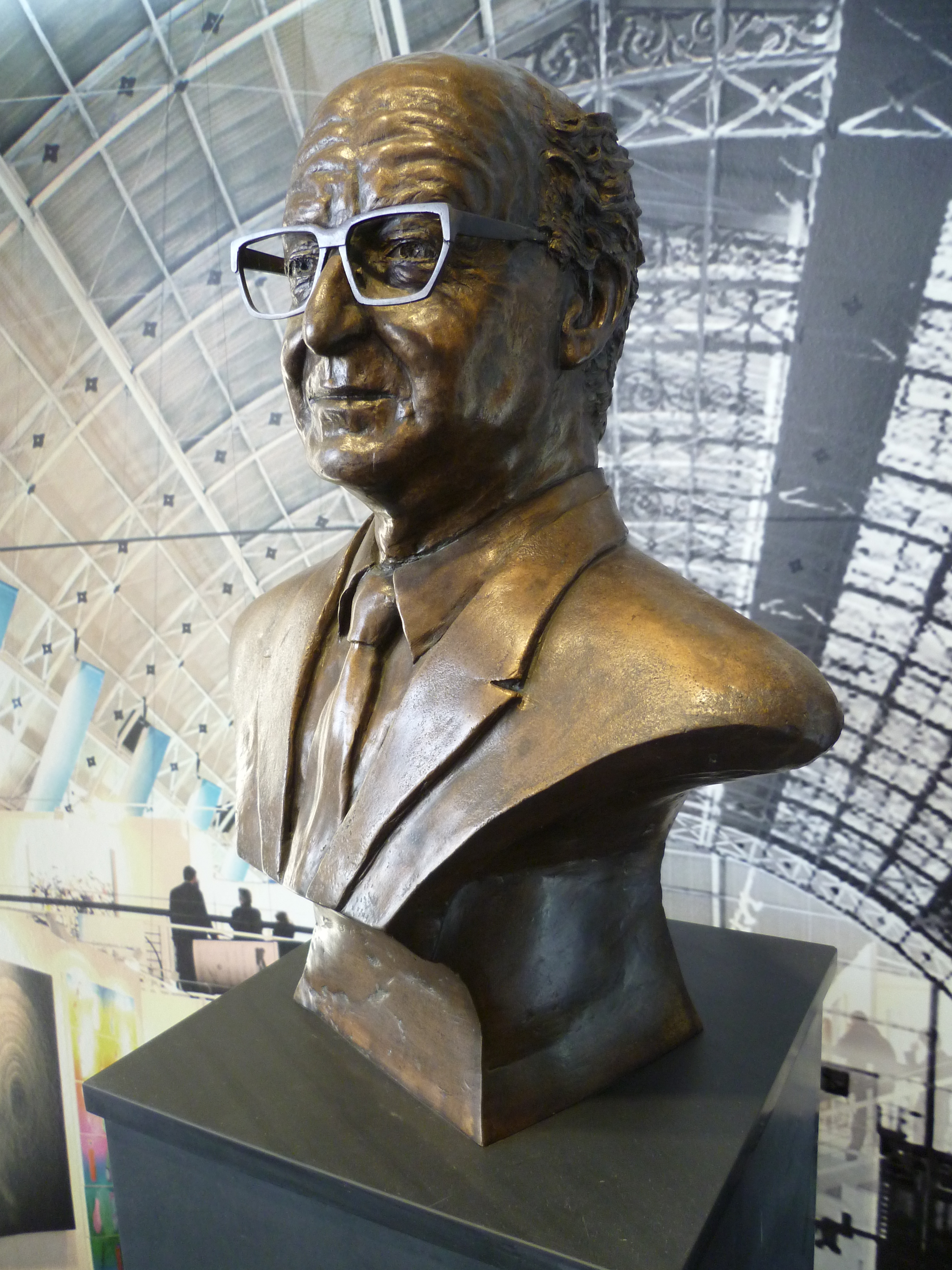
A bust of Sam Morris by Jonathan Wylder at the Business Design Centre in Islington, London

Sam Morris (1917–1991) was a British businessman who in the mid-1980s bought the Royal Agricultural Hall in Islington, London, and turned it into the Business Design Centre (BDC).

Morris is remembered by a bust on the upper level of the BDC near the main entrance and a charitable trust run by his sons.
