= Samuel Morison =

Samuel Morison is the name of:

- Samuel Eliot Morison (1887–1976), American historian and navy man
- Samuel Loring Morison (1944-2018), American intelligence analyst and grandson of S.E. Morison

== See also ==
- Samuel Morison Brown (1817–1856), Scottish chemist, poet and essayist
- USS Samuel Eliot Morison (FFG-13), frigate
- Samuel Morris (disambiguation)
