= Smithfield Show =

- Status: defunct
- Genre: agricultural show
- Frequency: annual
- Locations: from 1799: Wootton's Livery Stables, Smithfield, London; circa 1806–1838: Sadler's Yard, Goswell Street, Islington; 1839–1861: Baker Street Horse Bazaar, London; 1862–1938: Agricultural Hall, Islington, London; 1949–2004: Earl's Court Exhibition Centre, London
- Years active: 1799–2004
- Inaugurated: December 1799
- Most recent: 2004
- Organiser: Royal Smithfield Club

The Smithfield Show, formerly the Smithfield Club Cattle Show and later the Royal Smithfield Show, was an annual British agricultural show, organised by the Royal Smithfield Club. It was founded in 1799 and was first held at Wootton's Livery Stables in Dolphin Yard, Smithfield, London. From 1862 until 1938 it was held at the Agricultural Hall in Islington, London. From 1949 it was held at the Earl's Court Exhibition Centre in Earl's Court, London. The last show was held there in 2004; it was the last major livestock show in London.

== History ==
The Smithfield Club Cattle Show was first held in December 1799, at Wootton's Livery Stables in Dolphin Yard, Smithfield, London. It was organised by the Smithfield Cattle and Sheep Society (later the Royal Smithfield Club), which had been founded at Smithfield in the previous year.

By 1806 the show had moved to Sadler's Yard in Goswell Street, Islington. Sixty-one animals were shown. In 1839 it was moved to larger space, the Baker Street Horse Bazaar, where it lasted for four days and attracted some twenty or twenty-five thousand visitors. Attendance increased after members of the Royal Family began to attend.

In 1862 the show moved to the new Agricultural Hall in Islington, London, which had been purpose-built for it by the Club. The 1862 show attracted almost 135,000 visitors, a record, and in later years there were regularly more than 100,000. During and immediately after the Second World War, from 1939 to 1948, the show was not held; the Royal Agricultural Hall was requisitioned for the GPO in 1943. Annual shows recommenced in 1949, at the Earl's Court Exhibition Centre in Earl's Court, London; the last show was held there in 2004. It was the last major livestock show in London.

The Museum of English Rural Life's Royal Smithfield Club collection of paintings and prints of farm livestock executed during the period from 1775 to about 1860 includes animals which had won prizes at the Smithfield Shows of 1834 and 1851.

== The show ==
The Royal Smithfield Club was named after Smithfield Market, the centre of meat distribution in London. The show was for fatstock, meat breeds of domestic livestock. Later, agricultural machinery was also exhibited. Between 1876 and 1936 the Dairy Show, a similar show for dairy animals and equipment, was also held at the Agricultural Hall in Islington.

== Closure ==
The Royal Smithfield Show was discontinued after the 2004 show, after farm machinery manufacturers and suppliers declined to take part, due to the high costs.
