= Grade I and II* listed buildings in the London Borough of Islington =

There are over 9,000 Grade I listed buildings and 20,000 Grade II* listed buildings in England. This page is a list of these buildings in the London Borough of Islington.

== Grade I ==
Name	Location	Type	Completed (Note: The date given is the date used by Historic England as significant for the initial building or that of an important part in the structure's description.)	Date designated	Grid ref. (Note: The grid reference is based on the British national grid reference system, sometimes known as OSGB36, used by the Ordnance Survey.) Geo-coordinates	Entry number (Note: The "List Entry Number" is a unique number assigned to each listed building and scheduled monument by Historic England.)	Image
Clerks' Well and Chamber, in basement of Number 16, Farringdon Lane	Islington	Pump	c. 1174	29 December 1950	TQ3145282134; 51°31′22″N 0°06′24″W	1298055	Clerks' Well and Chamber, in basement of Number 16, Farringdon Lane More images
Finsbury Health Centre	Islington	Clinic	1935-8	29 September 1972	TQ3129482356; 51°31′30″N 0°06′32″W	1297993	Finsbury Health Centre More images
Former Church of St Luke	Islington	Church	1727–33	29 December 1950	TQ3232082421; 51°31′31″N 0°05′39″W	1195700	Former Church of St Luke More images
Church of St Saviour	Islington	Arts Centre	1994	20 September 1954	TQ3223685418; 51°33′08″N 0°05′39″W	1195443	Church of St Saviour More images
Priory Church of St John of Jerusalem	Clerkenwell, Islington	Church	c. 1140	29 December 1950	TQ3169882165; 51°31′23″N 0°06′11″W	1208840	Priory Church of St John of Jerusalem More images
St John's Gate	Clerkenwell, Islington	Gate	1504	29 December 1950	TQ3172382049; 51°31′19″N 0°06′10″W	1208827	St John's Gate More images
The Charterhouse	Islington	Town House	After World War II	29 December 1950	TQ3191181995; 51°31′17″N 0°06′00″W	1298101	The Charterhouse More images
Master's Lodge and attached railings, London Chaterhouse	Islington	Terrace	1716	29 December 1950	TQ3190481929; 51°31′15″N 0°06′01″W	1280100	Master's Lodge and attached railings, London Chaterhouse More images
Union Chapel	Islington	Congregational Chapel	Built 1876–77	29 September 1972	TQ3167184579; 51°32′41″N 0°06′09″W	1208365	Union Chapel More images
Wesley's Chapel	Islington	Methodist Chapel	1777–78	29 December 1950	TQ3284182274; 51°31′26″N 0°05′12″W	1195538	Wesley's Chapel More images
John Wesley's House and attached railings	Islington	Terrace	1779	29 December 1950	TQ3280882253; 51°31′25″N 0°05′13″W	1195533	John Wesley's House and attached railings More images
52–55 Newington Green	Islington	Terrace	1658	20 September 1954	TQ3279685351; 51°33′05″N 0°05′10″W	1293320	52–55 Newington Green More images

== Grade II* ==
Name	Location	Type	Completed	Date designated	Grid ref. Geo-coordinates	Entry number	Image
Angel Baptist Church	Islington	Chapel	c. 1824	29 September 1972	TQ3144482953; 51°31′49″N 0°06′23″W	1280178	Angel Baptist Church
Armoury House	Islington	House	1734-6	27 August 1957	TQ3271482186; 51°31′23″N 0°05′18″W	1195537	Armoury House More images
Bevin Court	Islington	Flats	1951–1954	22 December 1998	TQ3098182964; 51°31′49″N 0°06′47″W	1246687	Bevin Court More images
Canonbury Tower	Islington	House	Early 16th century	20 September 1954	TQ3194084530; 51°32′39″N 0°05′55″W	1280424	Canonbury Tower More images
Celestial Church of Christ, North London Parish	Islington	Church	1826–1829	20 September 1954	TQ3130283749; 51°32′15″N 0°06′30″W	1195557	Celestial Church of Christ, North London Parish More images
Church of Our Most Holy Redeemer, Clergy House, Campanile and Parish Hall	Islington	Clergy House	1894–1906	29 December 1950	TQ3126482428; 51°31′32″N 0°06′33″W	1209007	Church of Our Most Holy Redeemer, Clergy House, Campanile and Parish Hall More images
Church of St James and Attached Railings	Islington	Steps	1788–92	29 December 1950	TQ3151982216; 51°31′25″N 0°06′20″W	1207786	Church of St James and Attached Railings More images
Church of St Joseph	Islington	Roman Catholic Church	1888–1889	20 September 1954	TQ2887387183; 51°34′08″N 0°08′31″W	1279729	Church of St Joseph More images
Church of St Mary Magdalene and Attached Railings	Islington	Steps	1812–14	20 September 1954	TQ3128884971; 51°32′54″N 0°06′29″W	1195637	Church of St Mary Magdalene and Attached Railings More images
Clerkenwell Conference Centre	Islington	Conference Centre	1994	29 December 1950	TQ3150082101; 51°31′21″N 0°06′21″W	1298072	Clerkenwell Conference Centre More images
Finsbury Town Hall	Islington	Lamp Bracket	1895	29 December 1950	TQ3134882600; 51°31′37″N 0°06′29″W	1293112	Finsbury Town Hall More images
Former Sunday School, Lecture Hall and Vestry Block to Union Chapel	Islington	Congregational Chapel	Built 1876–77	28 November 2011	TQ3169384574; 51°32′41″N 0°06′08″W	1404206	Former Sunday School, Lecture Hall and Vestry Block to Union Chapel
Carlton Cinema	Islington	Church, former bingo hall, cinema	1930	16 January 1974	TQ3205784103; 51°32′25″N 0°05′50″W	1292870	Carlton Cinema More images
Monument to Daniel Defoe, Central Broadwalk	Islington	Obelisk	1870	21 February 2011	TQ3271682271; 51°31′26″N 0°05′18″W	1396492	Monument to Daniel Defoe, Central Broadwalk More images
Monument to Henry Hunter, Middle Enclosure	Islington	Obelisk	1801	21 February 2011	TQ3270282250; 51°31′25″N 0°05′19″W	1396523	Monument to Henry Hunter, Middle Enclosure More images
Monument to John Bunyan, Central Broadwalk	Islington	Cemetery	1862	21 February 2011	TQ3271882232; 51°31′24″N 0°05′18″W	1396491	Monument to John Bunyan, Central Broadwalk More images
Monument to Joseph Denison, South Enclosure	Islington	Cemetery	c. 1806	21 February 2011	TQ3267782235; 51°31′24″N 0°05′20″W	1396509	Monument to Joseph Denison, South Enclosure More images
Monument to Mary Boyle, South Enclosure	Islington	Cemetery	c. 1816	21 February 2011	TQ3266582219; 51°31′24″N 0°05′21″W	1396508	Monument to Mary Boyle, South Enclosure
Monument to Mary Page, Central Broadwalk	Islington	Cemetery	1728	21 February 2011	TQ3265482255; 51°31′25″N 0°05′21″W	1396494	Monument to Mary Page, Central Broadwalk More images
Monument to Sarah and John Wheatly, East Enclosure	Islington	Cemetery	1790	21 February 2011	TQ3272682263; 51°31′25″N 0°05′18″W	1396515	Monument to Sarah and John Wheatly, East Enclosure More images
Monument to Thomas and Hannah Miller, South Enclosure	Islington	Cemetery	Early 18th century	21 February 2011	TQ3273782240; 51°31′25″N 0°05′17″W	1396559	Monument to Thomas and Hannah Miller, South Enclosure
Numbers 1 to 24 and Attached Railings	Islington	Terrace	c1838-45	29 September 1972	TQ3133184004; 51°32′23″N 0°06′28″W	1279473	Numbers 1 to 24 and Attached Railings
Numbers 232 to 238 (even) Rainbow Theatre, Former	Islington	Cinema	1930	16 January 1974	TQ3122186515; 51°33′44″N 0°06′30″W	1297977	Numbers 232 to 238 (even) Rainbow Theatre, Former More images
Numbers 25 to 48 (consecutive) and Attached Railings	Islington	Terrace	c1838-45	29 September 1972	TQ3125683990; 51°32′22″N 0°06′32″W	1195675	Numbers 25 to 48 (consecutive) and Attached Railings More images
Sadler House and Attached Porters Lodge	Islington	Flats	1946–1950	22 December 1998	TQ3151682828; 51°31′45″N 0°06′20″W	1246833	Sadler House and Attached Porters Lodge More images
St John's Church with St Peter's and Churchyard Wall and Gates	Islington	Gate	1874	20 September 1954	TQ2969686649; 51°33′50″N 0°07′49″W	1195741	St John's Church with St Peter's and Churchyard Wall and Gates More images
St Paul's Church	Islington	Church	1826–28	20 September 1954	TQ3269384798; 51°32′47″N 0°05′16″W	1208912	St Paul's Church More images
Caledonian Park Clock Tower	Islington	Clock Tower	1855	29 September 1972	TQ3020384805; 51°32′50″N 0°07′25″W	1298021	Caledonian Park Clock Tower More images
Tomb of John Wesley in the Burial Ground of Wesley's Chapel	Islington	Tomb	1791	29 September 1972	TQ3286982279; 51°31′26″N 0°05′10″W	1207627	Tomb of John Wesley in the Burial Ground of Wesley's Chapel More images
Tunbridge House and Boiler House	Islington	Flats	1946–1949	22 December 1998	TQ3154282770; 51°31′43″N 0°06′18″W	1246685	Tunbridge House and Boiler House More images
Wells House	Islington	Flats	1946–1949	22 December 1998	TQ3148982773; 51°31′43″N 0°06′21″W	1246683	Wells House More images
3 Terrett's Place	Islington	House	1750	29 September 1972	TQ3165284049; 51°32′24″N 0°06′11″W	1209558	3 Terrett's Place
6–9 Canonbury Place	Islington	Manor House	Late 16th century	20 September 1954	TQ3200484526; 51°32′39″N 0°05′52″W	1195507	6–9 Canonbury Place
