= James Bunning =

James Bunning may refer to:

- Jim Bunning (1931–2017), American baseball pitcher and politician
- James Bunstone Bunning (1802–1863), British architect
