= James Webb (painter) =

British painter

- Born: 1835
- Died: 1895 (aged 59–60); City of London Asylum, Dartford
- Burial place: Brompton Cemetery
- Occupation: Painter
- Known for: Marine art, Landscapes
- Father: Archibald Webb
- Relatives: Byron Webb (Brother)

James Webb (1835–1895) was a British painter specialising in marine views and landscapes. He lived all his life in Chelsea, London.

== Life ==
He was born in a family of artists. His father Archibald Webb and his brother Byron Webb were also noted painters. He exhibited in London at the Royal Academy and the British Institute between 1850 and 1888, and many of his works still hang in London in the collections of the Victoria and Albert Museum and the Tate Gallery. Other works are found in a large number of provincial galleries. Webb was a pupil of Clarkson Frederick Stanfield.

He died on 9th March 1895 at the City of London Asylum, Dartford and is buried at Brompton Cemetery.

== Works ==
- 1857: The Lock
- 1859: A Barge in a Norfolk Landscape
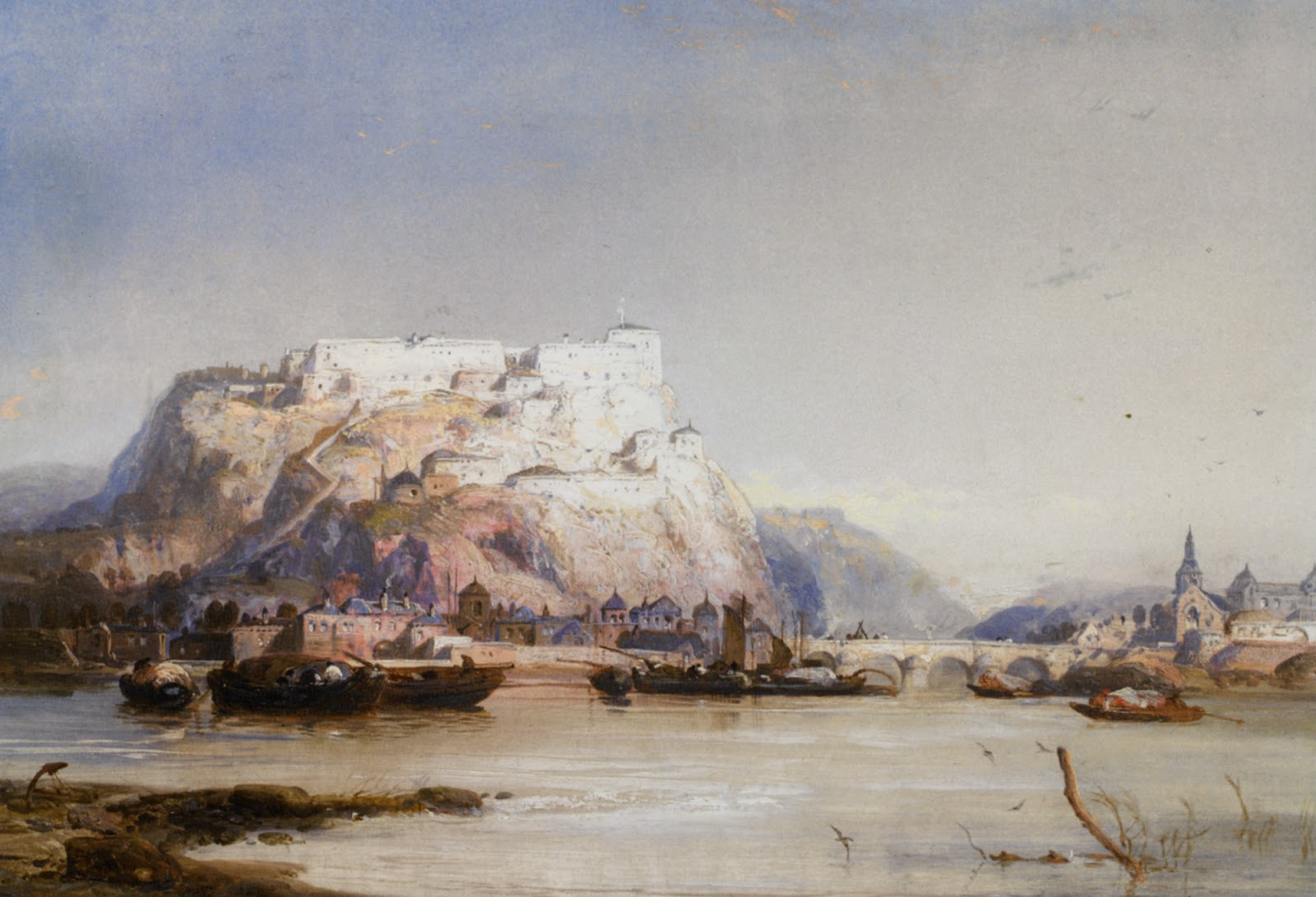
  Namur (1879)
  1863: Coastal Scene with Boats
- 1864: Fishing off the coast "Oil painting on canvas by James Webb", Richard Redding Antiques, includes one of the most detailed biographies available online
- 1865: On a choppy sea
- 1868: A view of Margate from the Pier (a smaller version of the undated painting owned by Thanet District Council). There are additional figures in the front left group on the pier. Sold by Bonhams 2007, privately owned.
- 1869: Mewstone
- 1870: View of Cologne with incomplete dome
- c.1870: Stricken Vessel off Harbour with Watching Fisherfolk'
- 1874: River Landscape
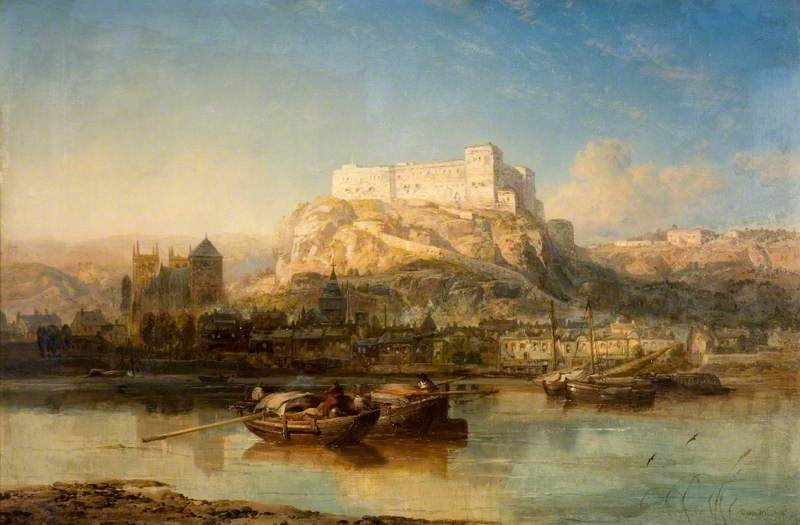
  Huy, Belgium
  1875: Fishing boats and shipping in Rotterdam in an evening calm. Sold to private collector.
- 1875: Seascape - which is held by Hartlepool Museum Service 1875: Cartagena
- 1875: Vessels moored at the steps of a Moorish palace
- 1876: Givet
- 1876: Dinant, Belgium
- 1876-1885: Old Kew Bridge, London – which is held at the Museum of London
- 1877: Heidelberg
- 1883: Birkhamstead
- 1888: Off to the fishing grounds

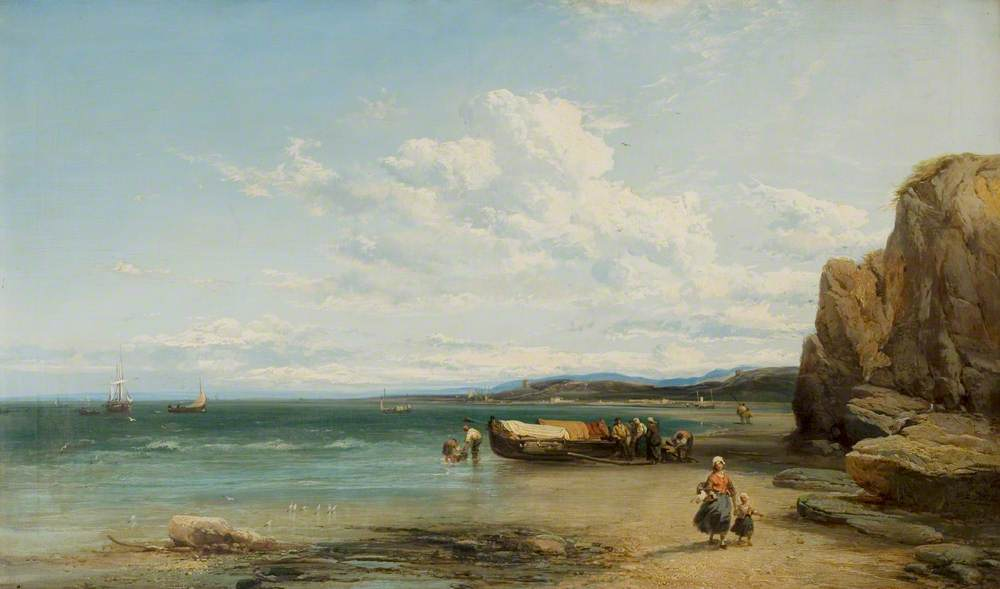
Coastal Scene with Boats (1863)

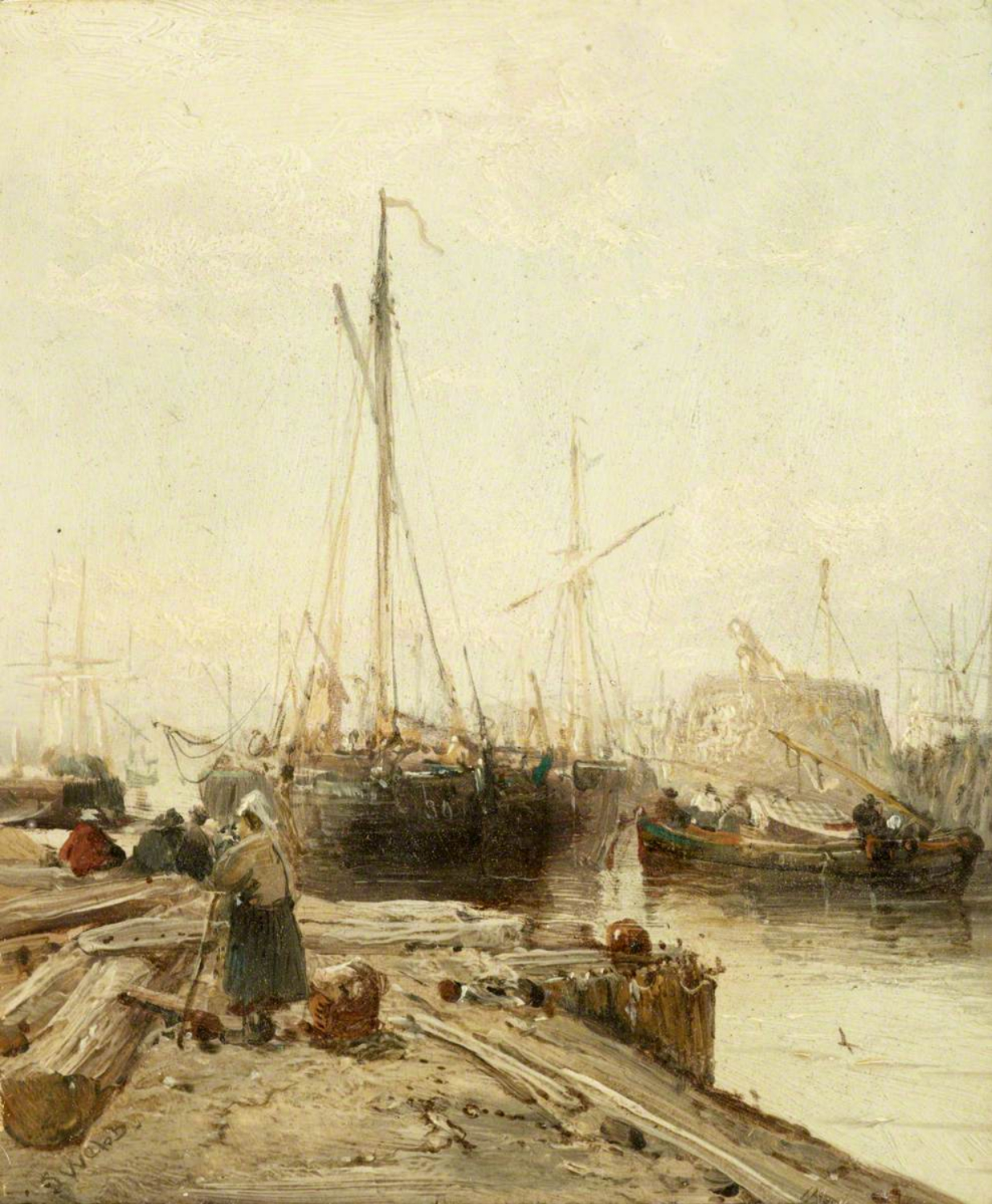
A Quay with Shipping

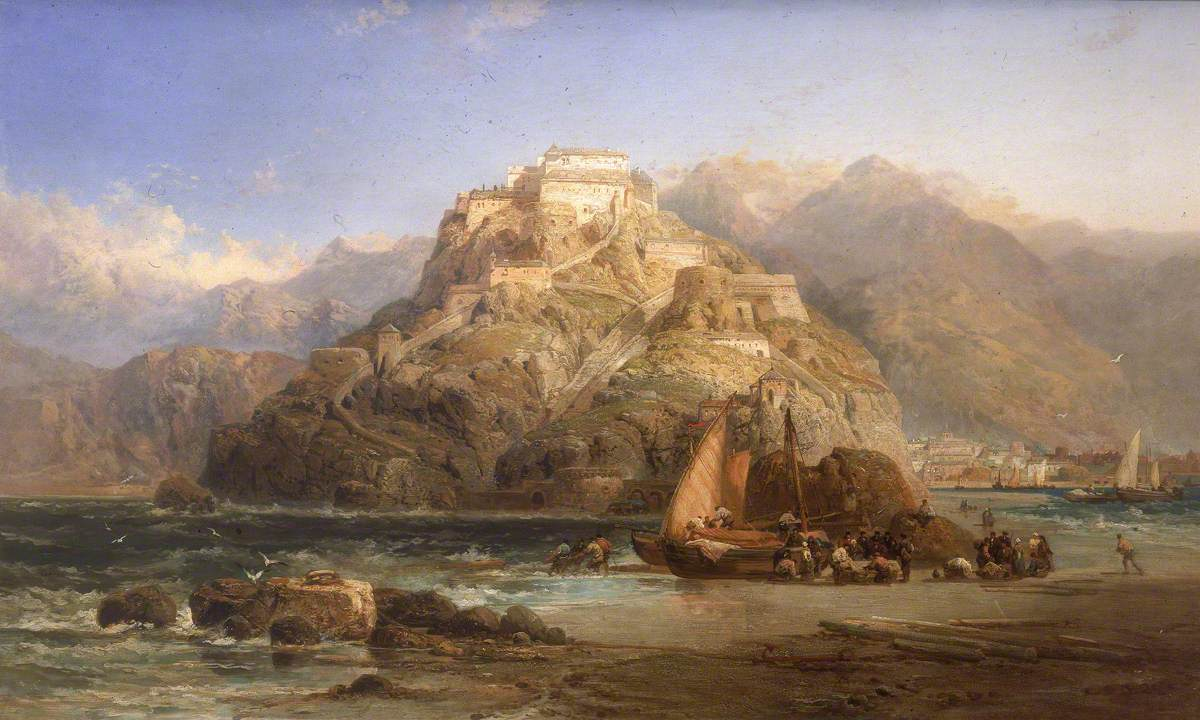
View of San Sebastian

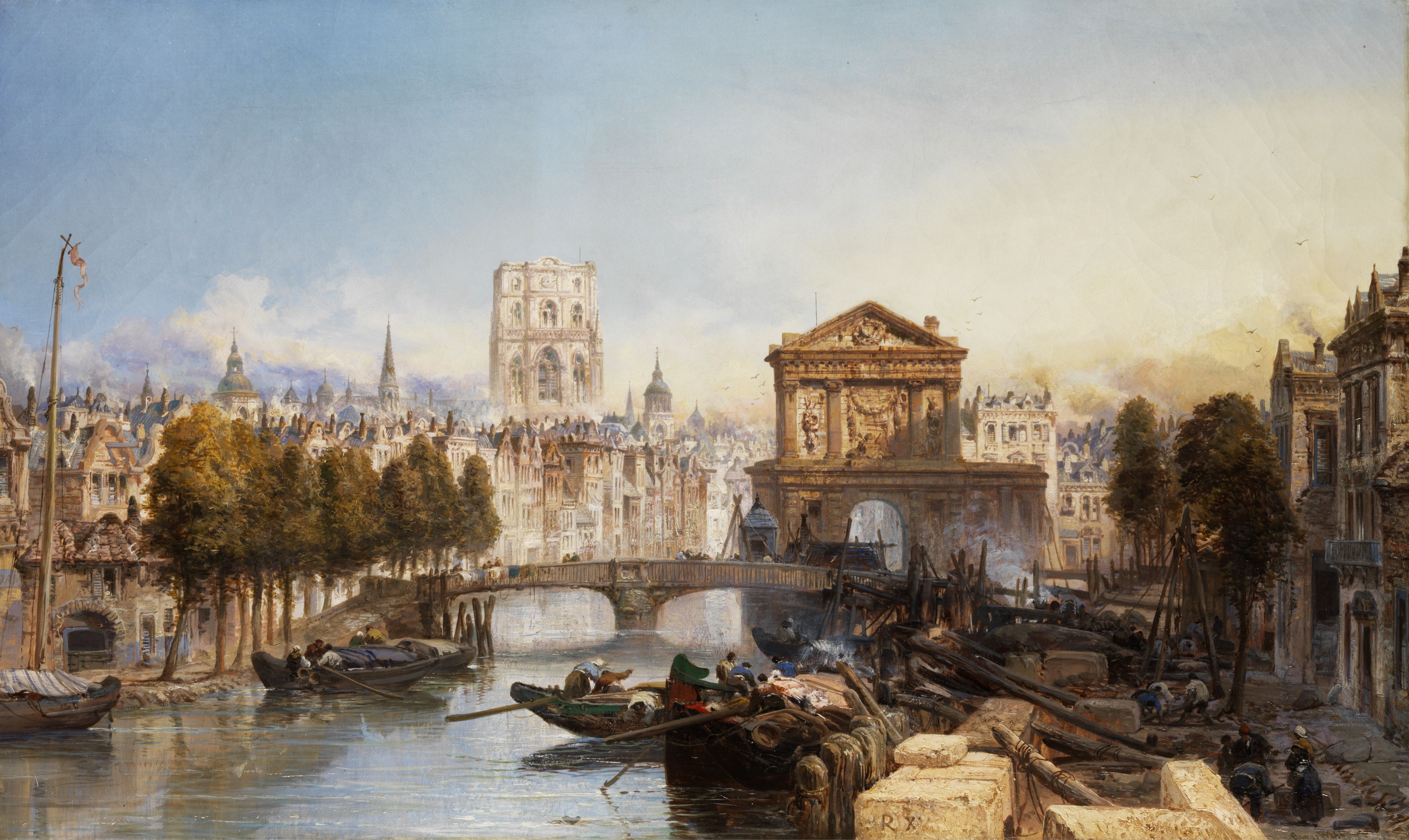
A View of Rotterdam

=== Undated ===
- Margate Pier, owned by Thanet District Council, on loan to Turner Contemporary gallery, Margate
- A View on the Rhine
- Shipping at sunset
- The end of the day (attributed)
- Cottages by the cliffs
- Gazing across the loch
- Sunset over Dordrecht Harbour
- Brighton in the Season (described in one obituary as his 'most important work')
- Moonlight near Rotterdam, exhibited at St James's Gallery 1884
