= Metropolitan Cattle Market =

Former London cattle market

Coordinates: 51.54618°N 0.12374°W

Diagram of Metropolitan Cattle Market, Islington

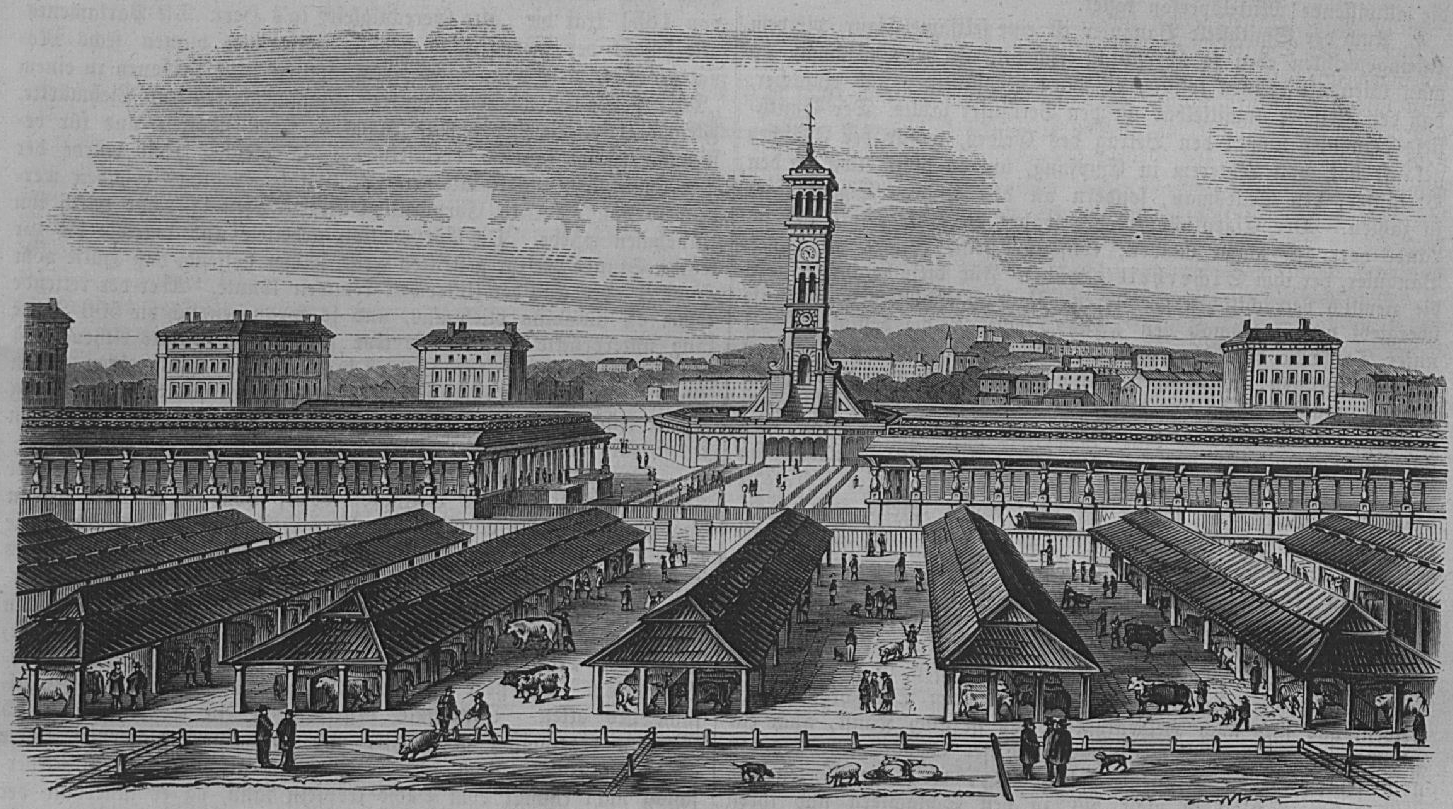
The newly opened market in a contemporary etching

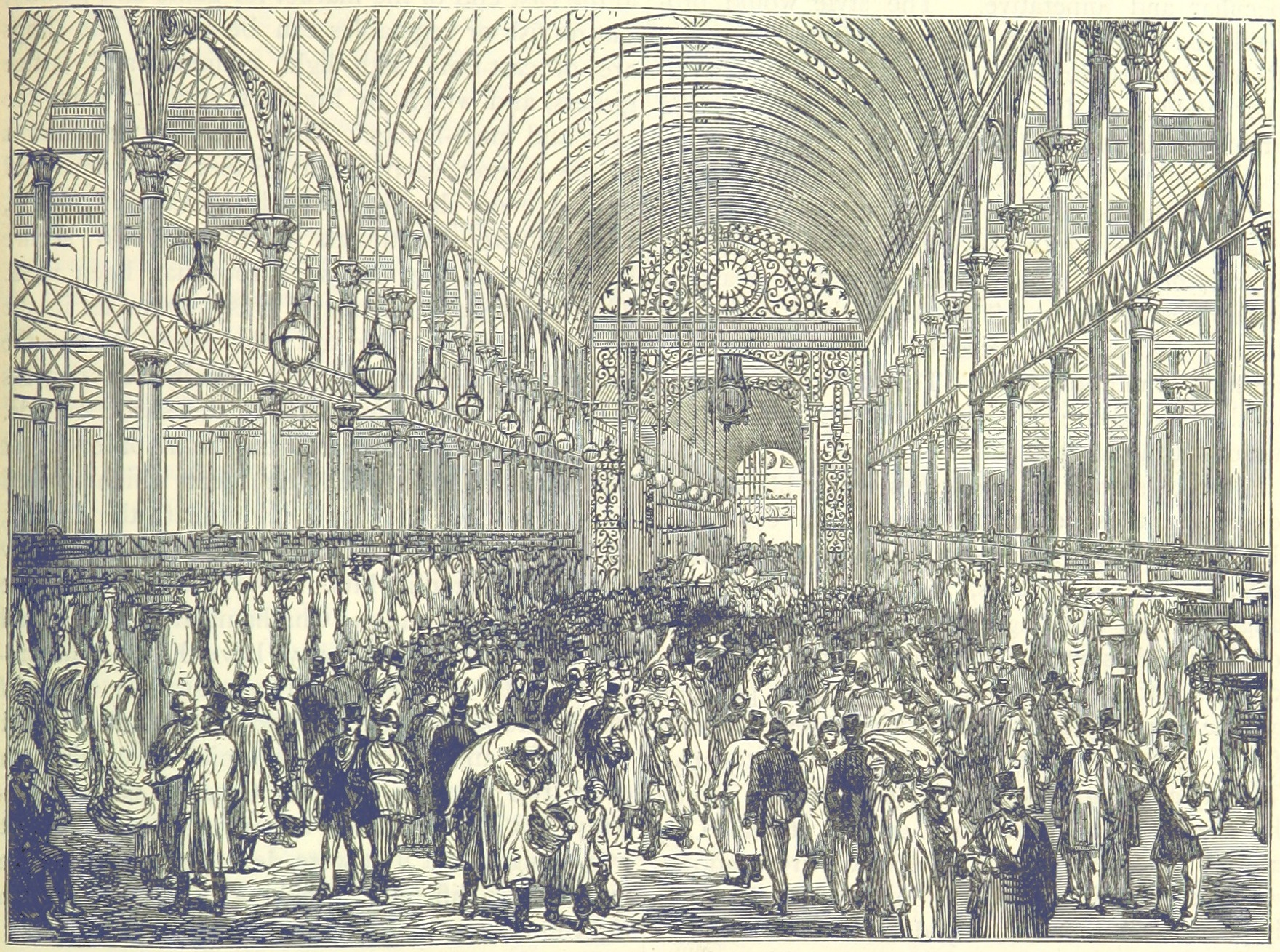
Inside the Metropolitan Meat Market

The Metropolitan Cattle Market (later Caledonian Market), just off the Caledonian Road in the parish of Islington (now the London Borough of Islington) was built by the City of London Corporation and was opened in June 1855 by Prince Albert. The market was supplementary to the meat market at Smithfield and was established to remove the difficulty of managing live cattle at that latter site.

== History ==
Metropolitan Market Act 1851 (Note: Section 43.)
- Act of Parliament
- Parliament of the United Kingdom
- Long title: An Act for providing a Metropolitan Market and Conveniences connected therewith in lieu of the Cattle Market at Smithfield.
- Citation: 14 & 15 Vict. c. 61
- Territorial extent: United Kingdom

Dates
- Royal assent: 1 August 1851
- Commencement: 1 August 1851 (Note: Section 1.)
- Repealed: 10 August 1857
Other legislation
Repealed by	Metropolitan Market Act 1857

Status: Repealed

Text of statute as originally enacted

The market was designed by the corporation's architect, James Bunstone Bunning. He had previously drawn up plans to rebuild the cattle market at Smithfield, before the Corporation decided to remove the trade in live animals to a site outside the City itself.

The market originally covered 30 acres (0.12 km^{2}) of the site and grounds of Copenhagen House, so named as the location of the Ambassador of Denmark's residence in the 17th century. Prior to being redeveloped these grounds housed a pleasure resort and tea garden. It occupied most of the land between Hungerford Road and Hartham Road (north), Caledonian Road (east), Brandon Road and Blundell Street (south) and York Way (west) and its construction cost the Corporation £300,000. Market Road, North Road, Shearling Way and Brewery Road were internal roads within the market area.

The site was chosen for its proximity to the goods yards of the newly opened Great Northern Railway and North London Railway to the north of King's Cross station. Livestock could be conveniently transported to the depots before being driven the short distance up York Way to the market or walked down from Holloway cattle dock and Junction Road railway station. On market days in excess of 15,000 animals could be traded.

The central market area was arranged in a rectangle with stalls and pens for cattle, sheep and pigs and a 46 metres (151 ft) tall central clock tower, today the Caledonian Park Clock Tower as the major remaining element of the market area, otherwise having been turned into the Caledonian Park.

Dealers' offices were arranged in the central area and slaughter houses were close by. The market was enclosed by cast iron railings, the columns of which were topped with cast iron heads of the animals traded. The railings remain but the heads were removed many years ago.

At each of the corners of the main area, large market pubs provided accommodation and entertainment for those visiting the market. The pubs were named The Lion, The Lamb, The White Horse and The Black Bull. Today, three of the four remain and, with the clock tower, are listed structures. A fifth pub, The Butchers Arms, built to a similar design, was located at the south-west corner of the market site at the junction of York Way and Brewery Road. The building remains.

In the early 20th century, as the trade in live animals diminished, a bric-a-brac market developed, which after the Second World War transferred south of the Thames to become the New Caledonian or Bermondsey Market. The markets in the area of the old Metropolitan Cattle Market finally closed in 1963.

== Redevelopment ==
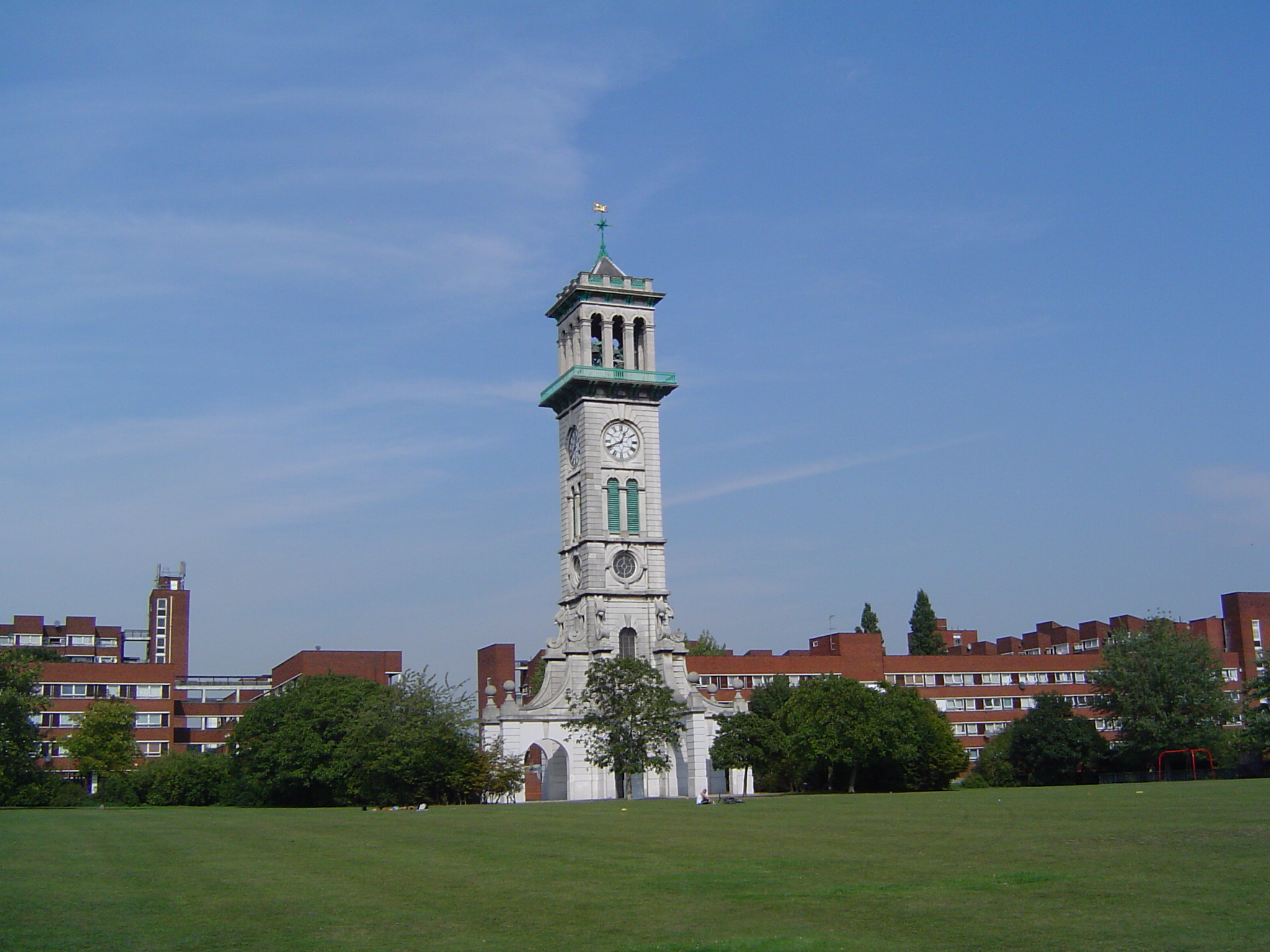
Present day park and Clock Tower

The northern part of the main market site was redeveloped by the Greater London Council (GLC) as the Market Estate and completed in 1967 to a design by architects Farber & Bartholomew. On the western area where sheep were kept, the Corporation built the York Way Estate to designs by McMorran & Whitby and completed in 1969. The southern area of the market, south of Market Road, where the cattle were kept and where the slaughter houses were is now sports pitches. The rest forms Caledonian Park.

At the break-up of the GLC, Market Estate was transferred to the control of the local authority, the London Borough of Islington. After years of poor maintenance and declining social conditions, the estate was transferred to a registered social landlord, Southern Housing, in 2005. The estate was regenerated, with the original blocks being demolished and replaced with a new layout of streets. The project was completed in 2012 by architects HTA and contractors Higgins Construction.

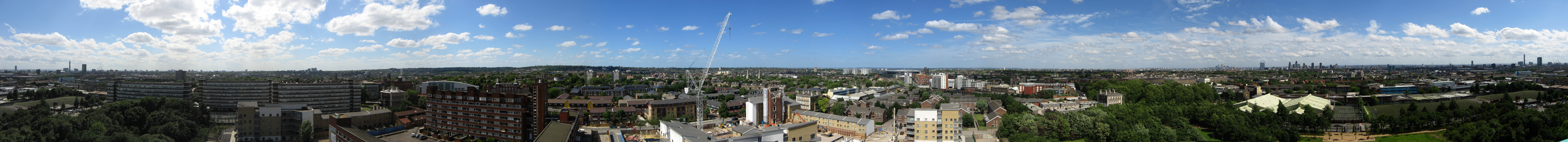
Panorama view from Clock Tower

== See also ==
- Foreign Cattle Market in Deptford, London's other livestock market
