= Market Estate =

Housing estate in London

Coordinates: 51.548°N 0.124°W

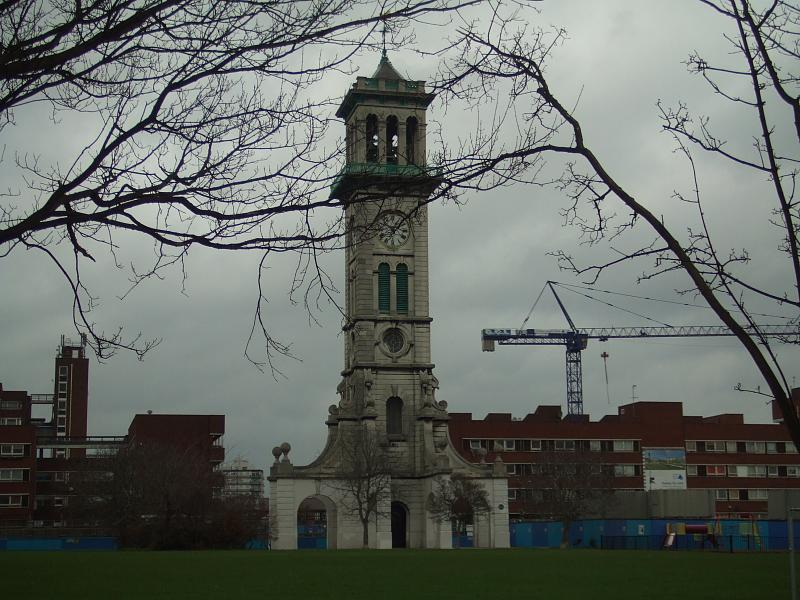
Caledonian Park Clock Tower, with the blocks of the estate behind

Market Estate is a public housing estate consisting of 271 flats and maisonettes situated to the north of Caledonian Park in the London Borough of Islington. It is named after the Metropolitan Cattle Market which operated on the site until the 1960s. After slaughter the carcasses of cattle and sheep were sent by underground trains to Smithfield Market to be traded. Three of the six blocks that make up the estate are named after breeds of animal that were traded in the market: Tamworth (pigs), Kerry (cows) and Southdown (sheep). The remaining three blocks are called the Clock tower blocks after the market's clock tower which still stands in Caledonian Park. This contains a working clock used as a prototype for the mechanism of Big Ben.

== History ==
The estate was built by the Greater London Council (GLC) who purchased the site from the Corporation of London, who had run the market. It was completed in 1967 to a design by architects Farber & Bartholomew. Although flats are relatively large (having been built in accordance with the then new Parker Morris standards), the estate became run down, neglected and plagued by anti-social behaviour. The redevelopment of nearby Kings Cross probably contributed to a growing drugs and prostitution problem in and around the estate as activity was displaced from Kings Cross.

A multimillion-pound UK Government and Islington London Borough Council investment in the 1990s failed to stop the decline. Walkways connecting the blocks were mainly removed, gardens created for most ground floor flats, and closed-circuit television cameras linked to a concierge in an onsite office installed. The concierge's office was burnt out and the CCTV system vandalised. It was not replaced.

Hyde Northside were given the management of the estate in 2001. Following the death of a young boy on the estate, Christopher Pullen, when a security door fell on him, residents set up the Market Estate Tenants and Residents Association (METRA), demanding that the estate's fundamental problems be resolved. Following several years of discussions, it was agreed that the estate needed complete redevelopment. Islington Council decided that the only way of bringing in the necessary funding to do this would be to invite a housing association to take the estate over in a stock transfer. Hyde Northside failed to be selected by the residents and Southern Housing Group was chosen from a short list by METRA representatives in 2003. After nearly 18 months of further discussions between residents, Islington Council, the office for the deputy prime minister (ODPM), Southern Housing Group and their masterplan architects, Watkins Gray International, over 80% of the secure tenants on the estate voted on whether to transfer the estate and their tenancies to Southern Housing Group, with over 85% voting in favour.

Under the agreement the whole estate was demolished and replaced by a mixture of houses and small blocks of modern low rise flats, built on a traditional street pattern to Watkins Gray International's masterplan. The contractor on this project was Higgins Construction. Existing secure tenants were guaranteed a new home on the new development if they wanted it, and 90 additional homes for sale and shared ownership will also be built to help cross-subsidise the costs of building tenants' new homes.

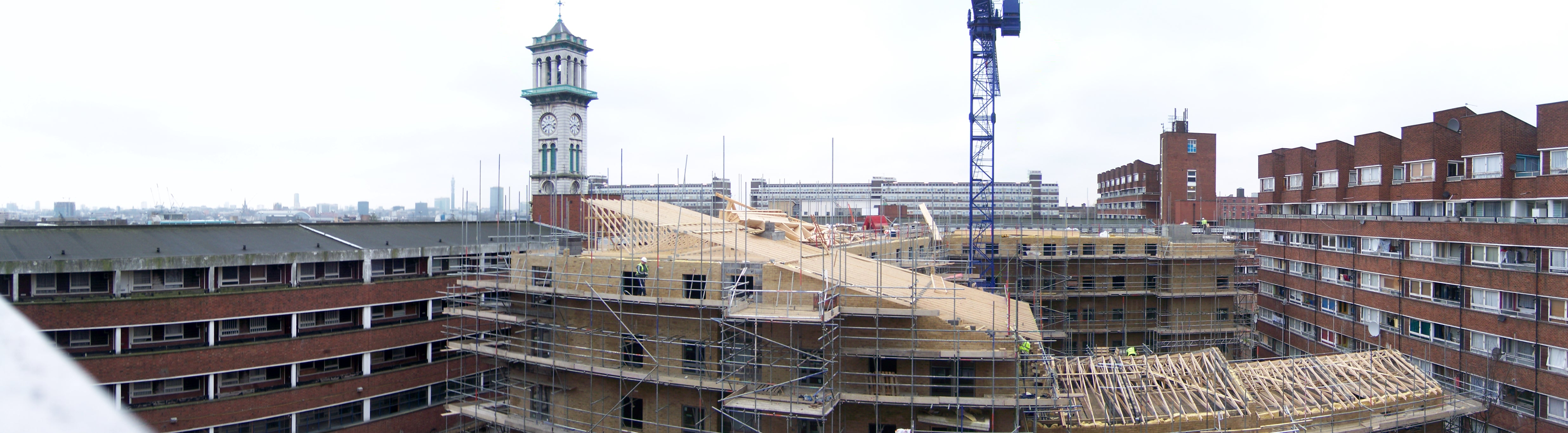
Market clock tower seen over one of the original blocks with a new block under construction, in 2007

Caledonian Park was scheduled for improvement as part of the scheme. Work on the new homes started in early 2005, significant improvements were made to Caledonian Park beginning in 2006 including planting new trees and redoing all the paths. The last remaining residents moved out of the old Market Estate blocks in February 2010.

The York Way Estate alongside has frontages to York Way and Market Road, set behind lawns and trees. It was built by the Corporation of London on part of the market site they retained after the market closure and is sometimes assumed to be part of the Market Estate, with which it is contemporary. It was built to the designs of McMorran & Whitby architects. Managed directly by the Corporation of London it has not suffered the poor maintenance and social breakdown of the Market Estate and remains essentially as built.

== The Market Estate Project ==
Following the closure of the old blocks, the Market Estate Project invited 75 artists, designers and the residents of the estate, to work together in flats left behind, corridors, staircases and building facades. Work was developed over a number of months, culminating in a one-day event on 6 March 2010 which invited the public to explore the art works created on site, just before the demolition bulldozers moved in.

The project was developed as a partnership between Southern Housing Group and TallTales, a London-based art practice which focuses on working with artists in areas undergoing development. An estimated 2500 people attended the day, which was described by British artist Anthony Gormley as a "joy and delight".
