= Holloway car dock =

Railway station in London, England

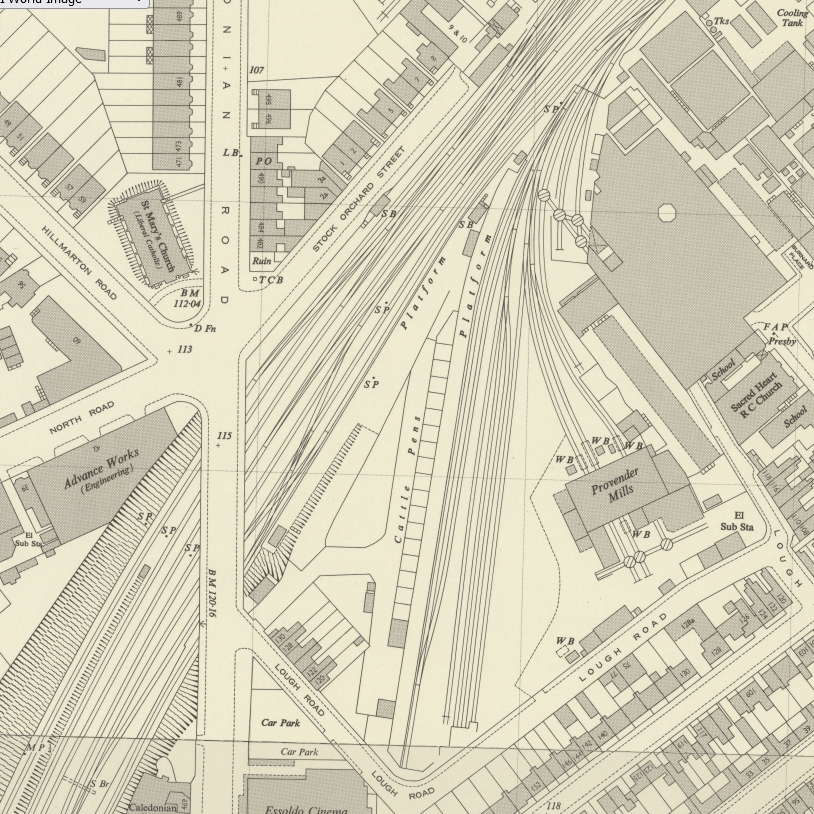
- Holloway Cattle Dock, 1953

General information
- Location: Holloway, Islington
- Coordinates: 51.54989°N 0.11695°W
- Platforms: 2

Other information
- Status: Disused

Key dates
- 1855: Opened as cattle dock
- 1930s: Closed
- 30 May 1960: Opened as car dock
- 15 September 1968: Closed
- Replaced by: Kensington Olympia Motorail
Location
- Location in Islington

Holloway car dock was a railway station in London, England.

== Cattle dock ==
North London Railway (Cattle Market Station) Act 1854
- Act of Parliament
- Long title: An Act to enable the North London Railway Company to construct a Station or Depot near to the New Metropolitan Cattle Market; to raise additional Capital; and for other Purposes.
- Citation: 17 & 18 Vict. c. lxxx

Dates
- Royal assent: 3 July 1854

It opened to the east of Caledonian Road as the Holloway cattle dock in 1855 and served the Metropolitan Cattle Market. The cattle dock closed in the 1930s.

== Car dock ==
The station was located on the up (towards London) side of the East Coast Main Line. It had a single platform that faced two tracks and had a dock for loading cars. Car carrier service began on 30 May 1960.

It became the London terminus of the seasonal Car-Sleeper Limited service to Perth, Scotland that had been running to Kings Cross from June 1955. Departures to Perth were at 21:10 each evening and the return service arrived at 05:30 each morning. The Perth overnight car sleeper service ended at Holloway in October 1965 and transferred to Kensington Olympia station from 1966 with the introduction of Motorail branded services.

There was also a daytime Anglo-Scottish Car Carrier service from the Holloway dock to Edinburgh, departing on weekdays at 07:51 and with a return service arriving at 19:02. In 1965 the service was promoted by British Rail with images of James Bond's Aston Martin DB5 from the 1964 film Goldfinger being loaded onto the car carrier service at Holloway.

The car dock was last served on 15 September 1968.
