= Caledonian Park Clock Tower =

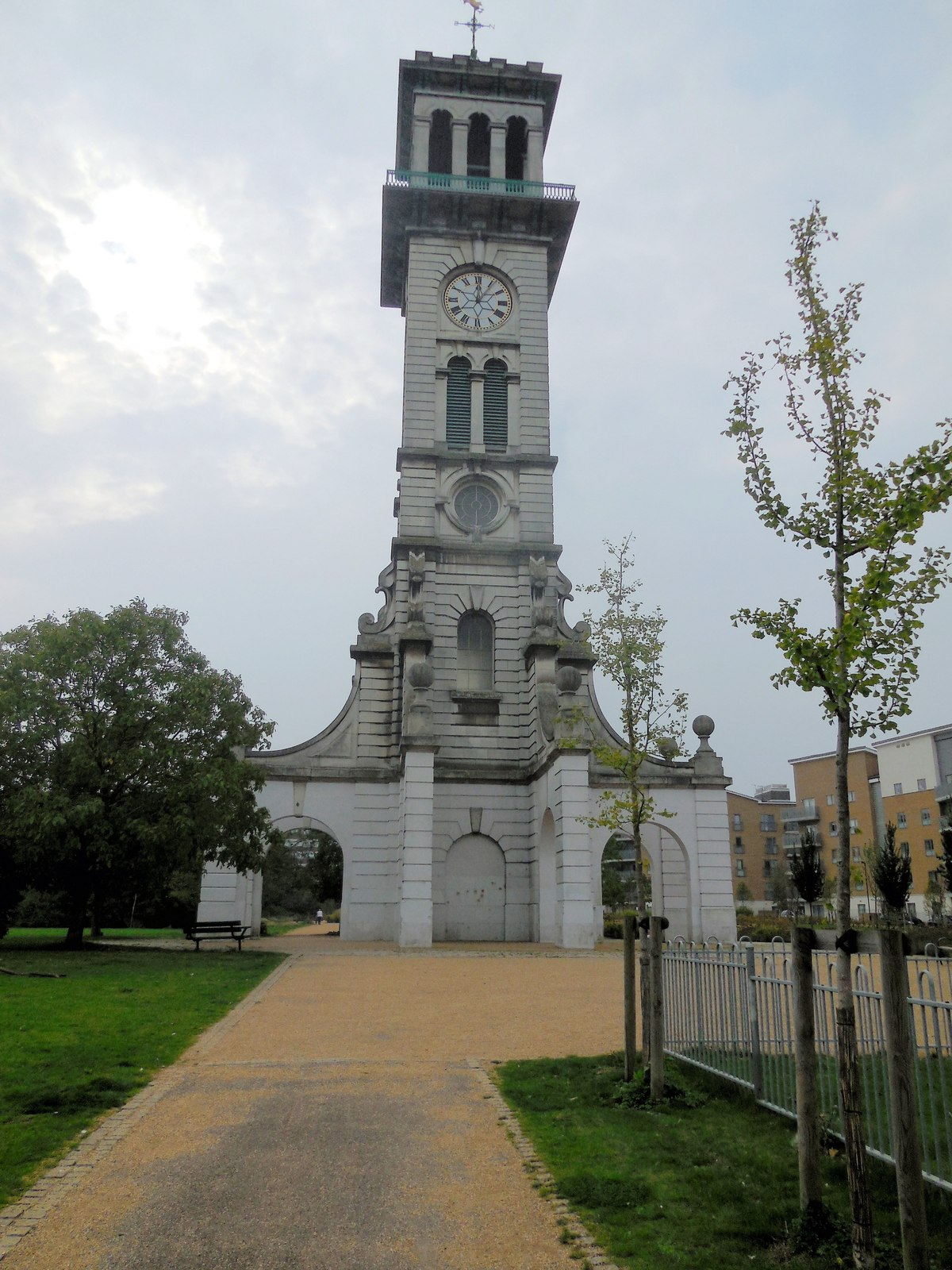
- "the magnificent clock tower, Italianate, Baroque and Quattrocento"

- Location within London Borough of Islington
- 51.5471°N 0.1236°W
- Type: Clock tower
- Location: Islington, London

History
- Built: 1855

Site notes
- Architect: James Bunstone Bunning
- Architectural style: Italianate
- Governing body: Islington London Borough Council

Listed Building – Grade II*
- Official name: The Clock Tower
- Designated: 29 September 1972
- Reference no.: 1298021

Listed Building – Grade II
- Official name: Railings, walls, gate piers and gates to Caledonian Park
- Designated: 30 September 1994
- Reference no.: 1208009

Listed Building – Grade II
- Official name: Railings and gates to Islington Tennis Centre and King George's Field
- Designated: 30 September 1994
- Reference no.: 1195681

Listed Building – Grade II
- Official name: The Lamb Tavern Public House
- Designated: 29 September 1972
- Reference no.: 1208151

Listed Building – Grade II
- Official name: Market House (formerly The White Horse Public House)
- Designated: 29 September 1972
- Reference no.: 1195680

The Caledonian Park Clock Tower is located in Holloway and is the major remaining element of the Metropolitan Cattle Market, opened in 1855 by the City of London Corporation as a replacement for the market at Smithfield. The complex was designed by the Corporation's Surveyor, James Bunstone Bunning, and was laid out on a site of 30 acres (0.12 km^{2}) that originally formed the estate of a mansion, Copenhagen House. The market consisted of the central clock tower, enclosures for animals, slaughterhouses, sales arenas, administrative offices and four public houses, one standing at each corner of the complex. The cattle market was closed in the 1930s, and the meat market in the 1960s, with much of the site being redeveloped for council housing. The clock tower, two stretches of railings and three of the four pubs are all that now remain. After suffering neglect and vandalism in the late 20th century, the clock tower was restored between 2016 and 2019 and is now open to the public. It is a Grade II* listed building, the railings and pubs having separate Grade II listings.

== History ==
The market at Smithfield in the City of London has been in operation for over 800 years. By the mid-Victorian era, the development of London had made the transportation of livestock into the centre of the city problematic and in 1852 the Smithfield Market Removal Act was passed, allowing for the construction of a new Metropolitan Cattle Market on the site of a demolished mansion, Copenhagen House, in Islington, to the north of the city. (Note: After the demolition of the mansion, the grounds initially became a public space and pleasure grounds named Copenhagen Fields. In 1834, thousands of Londoners demonstrated in the fields in support of the Tolpuddle Martyrs.) The market complex was designed by the Corporation of London's Surveyor, James Bunstone Bunning, and was opened by Prince Albert on 15 June 1855. The rectangular site radiated out from the central clock tower and comprised livestock pens that could accommodate 12,700 cattle, sheep and pigs, slaughterhouses, sales arenas, offices, banks, a telegraph office and two hostels and five pubs for the rest and recreation of the drovers who brought the animals into London, and for the market workers.

The sale of livestock at the site ended in the 1930s, and of meat in the 1960s. The market buildings were then mostly demolished, council housing, principally the Market Estate, was built over much of the site, and the remainder converted to a municipal park. In the late 20th century, the tower suffered considerably from vandalism. In 2016, Islington Council began a restoration project at a cost of just under £2M which saw the reopening on the clock tower in 2019. The tower now offers public access and guided tours.

== Architecture and description ==
The tower, standing 46 m (151 ft) high, was designed to act as a focal point for drovers entering London. It has five storeys and is constructed of Portland stone. The base is rusticated and is supported by "swooping buttresses" on each side. The clock set into the fourth storey is by the firm of John Morris of Clerkenwell and has a set of three bells which rang each day to signal the market's opening and closing. The final storey has a balustrade giving good views over London, and is topped with a weather vane in the form of a dragon which was re-gilded during the restoration in 2016-2019. (Note: The restoration of the tower was shortlisted for the AJ Architecture Awards in 2019.) Bridget Cherry, in her revised London 4: North edition of the Pevsner Buildings of England, describes the Caledonian Park Clock Tower as "magnificent... Italianate... with swooping Baroque buttresses... and a more conventional Quattrocento top". The tower is a Grade II* listed building. Two sets of railings which once fully enclosed the market are listed Grade II. Three of the four public houses which originally stood at each corner of the market site remain, The White Horse, The Lamb, and The Lion, each of which is also listed Grade II. The fourth, The Black Bull, which stood at the south-west corner has been demolished.

== Sources ==
- Cherry, Bridget; Pevsner, Nikolaus (2002). London 4: North. The Buildings of England. New Haven, US and London: Yale University Press. ISBN 978-0-300-09653-8. OCLC 1080929646.
