= Angel Baptist Church =

Church in the London Borough of Islington, England

The Angel Church, Islington
- The Angel Church, Islington
- Location: Chadwell Street, Islington, London EC1R 1XD
- Country: England
- Language: English
- Denomination: Non-conformist
- Churchmanship: Baptist
- Website: Church website

History
- Status: Active
- Founded: c. 1823–1824
- Founder: Thomas Elliott

Architecture
- Heritage designation: Grade II* listed
- Architectural type: Georgian

Clergy
- Pastor: Regan Blanton King

The Angel Baptist Church (formerly Providence Chapel and Mount Zion Chapel) is a non-conformist church on Chadwell Street, in the Borough of Islington, London. The building was completed in 1824 and the church and its iron railings were Grade II* listed in 1972.

== History ==
Providence Chapel was originally built for a congregation of Calvinistic Methodists by Thomas Elliot, a property developer who lived near New River Head in Clerkenwell. He originally agreed to build the chapel in 1821, but delayed work for around two years until the New River Company insisted that he complete it. The chapel was finished in 1824 along with a smaller house to the rear. (Note: London Metropolitan Archives. New River Company, Acc/2558/NR/1/9–10.)

The congregation left in 1827, however it was taken over by a group of former Scottish Presbyterians who had protested the ministry of Edward Irving. Over the following years it was occupied by other congregations, until 1853, when it became a Baptist church and was renamed to Mount Zion Chapel.

During this time the chapel became known as the Angel Baptist Church and continued under its Baptist congregation (although it was also used by a Pentecostalists). More recently, it was acquired by the Grace Baptist Church in Wood Green, who sought to establish an independent Baptist church with evangelical convictions.

During the COVID-19 pandemic, in November 2020, police stopped worshippers from entering a baptism service held by pastor Regan King, which breached the lockdown restrictions. King was among 122 church leaders who had challenged the ban on communal worship at the time.

=== Architecture ===
The chapel was constructed in red stock brick, fronted with a stucco façade. Its porch may not be original, as it was not included in the original lease plan. (Note: London Metropolitan Archives. New River Company, Acc/1953/C/859.) Alterations to the building were made during the late nineteenth century, including iron railings, a wooden roof, and the match-boarded ceiling. The house behind the chapel was demolished in 1929 for a school to be built in its place.
