= Matchboard =

Matchboard is a type of board with a groove cut along one edge and a tongue along the other so as to fit snugly with the edges of similarly cut boards.

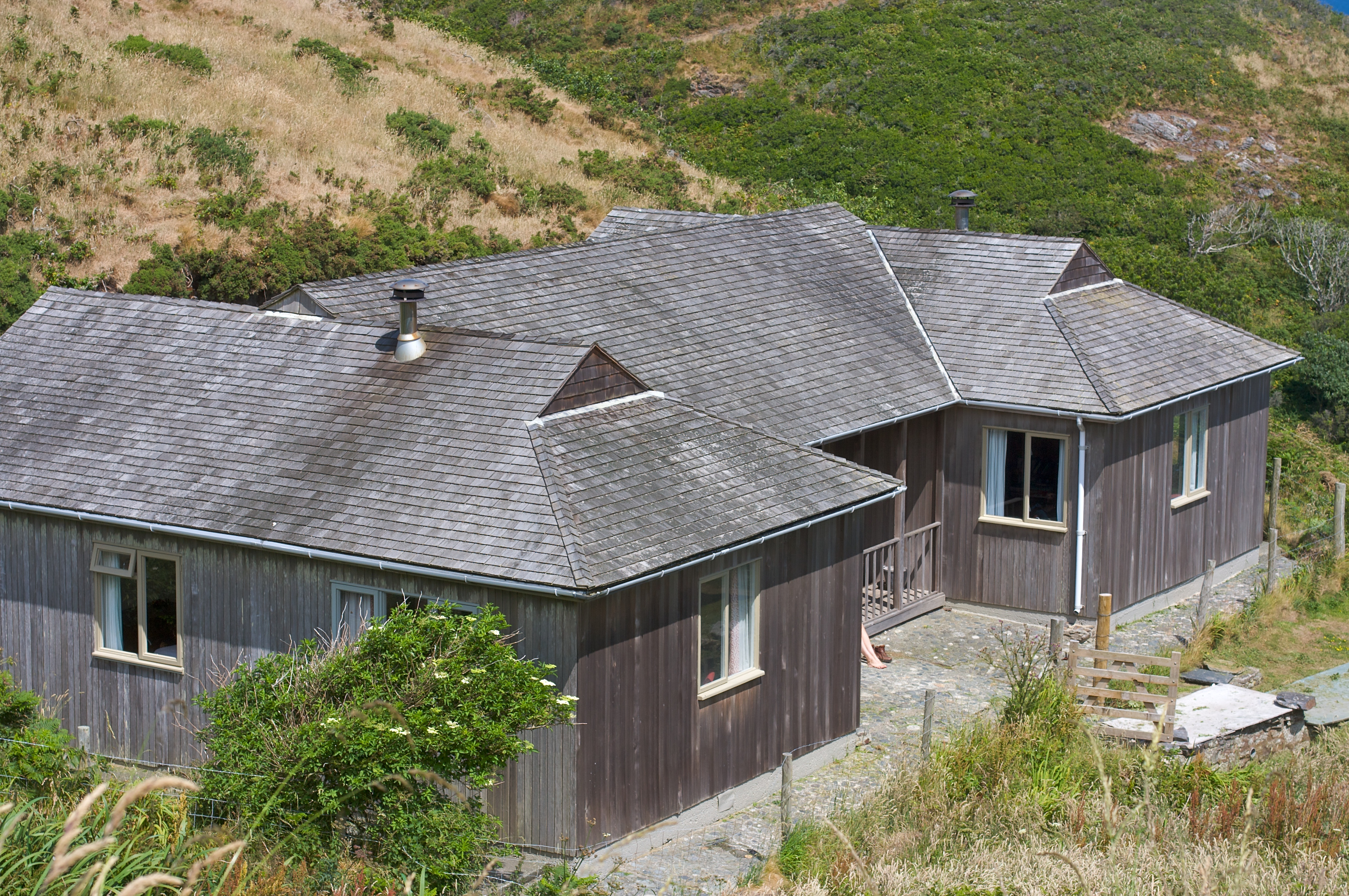
Bramble Cottage on Lundy Island, weathered cedar matchboarding in an exposed location

Matchboarding can be used both internally and externally, and can be layered in many different styles including: square edge, feather edge, ship lap and tongue and groove.

Matchboard was most popular in the late Victorian period, when woodworking machinery had developed that could cut the edge joints quickly and cheaply. In the 1930s, further developments in glues and veneer-cutting machinery made plywood affordable. This also gave a cleanly smooth-surfaced Modernist look that suited the taste for new styles. Matchboard then became much less popular. In the 1970s there was a resurgence of interest in the style as a retro feature, but this was usually provided, for cost reasons, as a faux matchboard effect pressed into the surface of a plywood board.
