= Copenhagen House Grounds =

Coordinates: 51.5465°N 0.1235°W

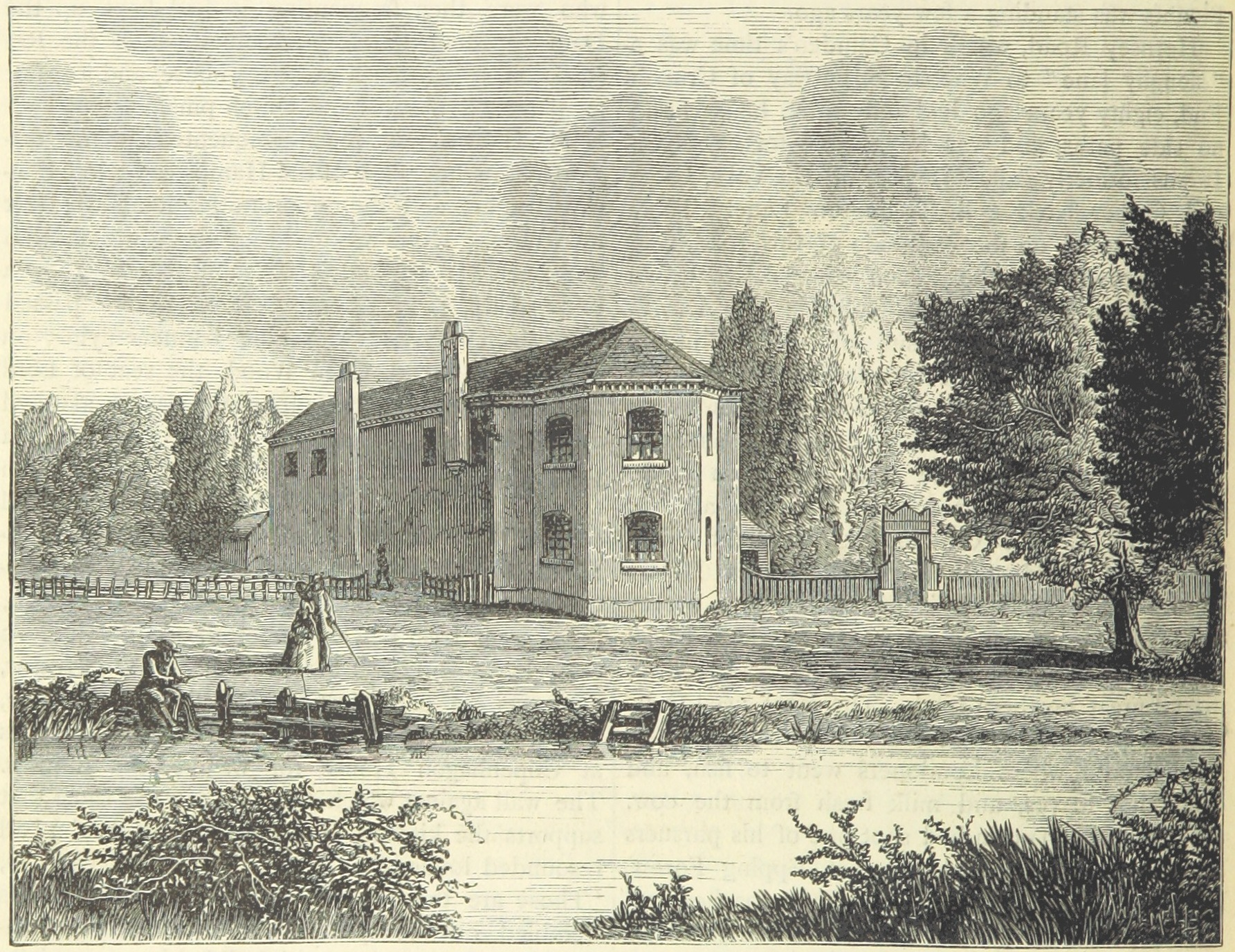
Old Copenhagen House at Islington, in turn ambassador's residence, tavern and pleasure grounds, cricket ground and athletic track. From a view taken about 1800

Copenhagen House Grounds in Islington, London also known as the 'Old Cope' was opened 24 September 1850 and was the leading venue for professional athletics until it closed in December 1853 after severe storm damage. Initially consisting of a 200-yard straight, an oval gravel track was added, opening on 17 March 1851, thought to be one third of a mile in length, enclosing a cricket pitch.

The name derives from the fact it was once the location of the Ambassador of Denmark's residence in the 17th century. This area was later known as Copenhagen Fields, and lay adjacent to the Metropolitan Cattle Market, now Caledonian Park. Whilst much of the site has been built upon, Market Road Gardens, an open space directly above the tunnels, are a present-day surviving remnant of the Fields.

When the Great Northern Railway was built in 1850, a tunnel was built underneath the fields, taking its name from them: Copenhagen Tunnel.

The Copenhagen Grounds hosted some of the earliest professional Lancashire catch-as-catch-can championships, where wrestlers competed for the prestigious Copenhagen Grounds Silver Belt.

One of the first world records for the mile was set there; Charles Westhall in 4:28 on 26 July 1852.
