= St Joseph's Church, Highgate =

Roman Catholic church in Highgate, London, United Kingdom

Coordinates: 51.5688°N 0.1419°W

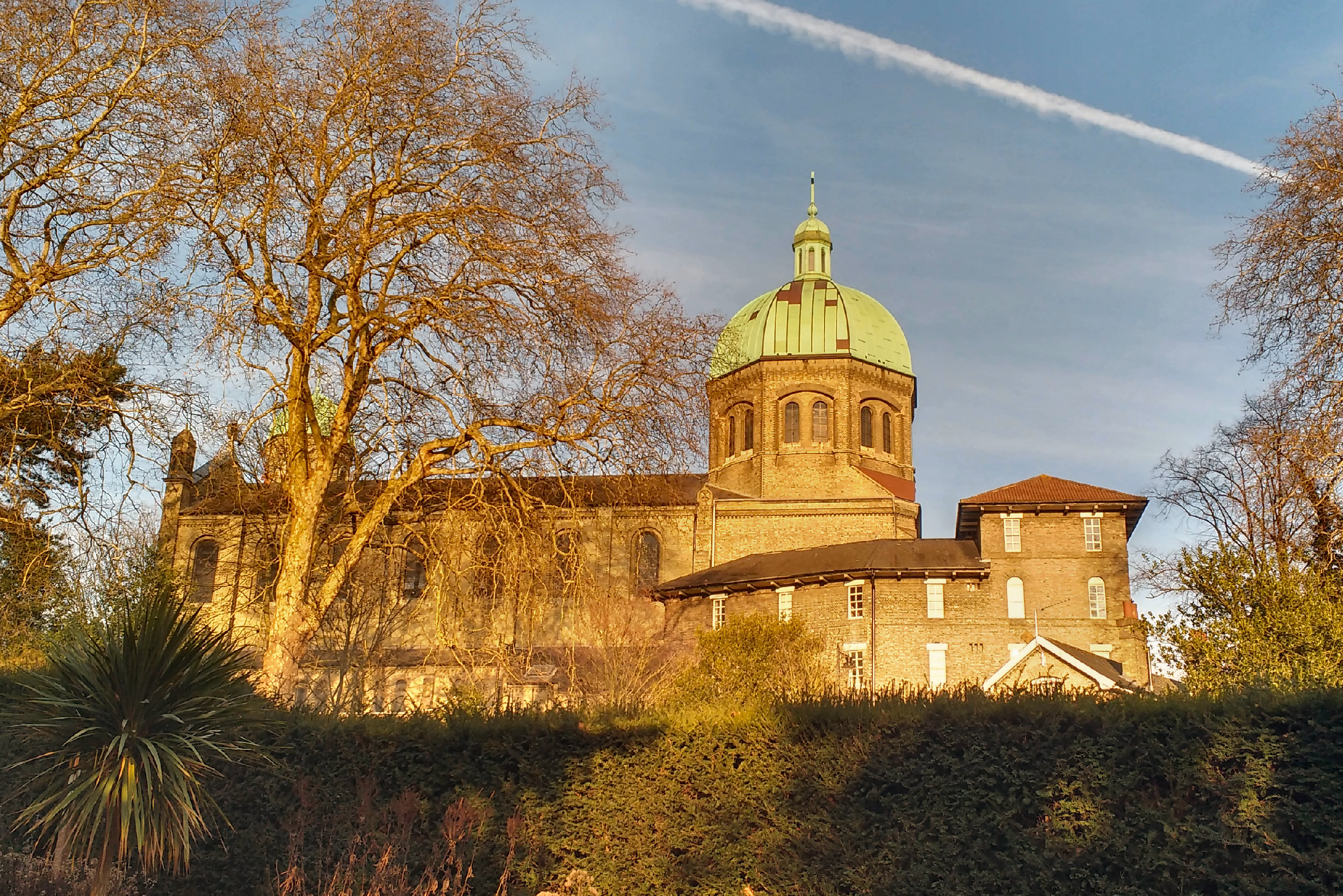
St. Joseph's Church, seen from Waterlow Park

St Joseph's Church, Highgate is a parish of the Catholic Church on Highgate Hill, in the Diocese of Westminster, London. It was founded by the Passionist Congregation in 1858. It is a grade II listed building.

== History ==
St Joseph's was first established in 1858 by Father Ignatius Spencer, who had converted to the Roman Catholic Church and entered the Passionist Order. He had found the location in Highgate in the Old Black Dog Inn, with a chapel in the ground floor and accommodation for the community on the floor above. The first church was built in 1861/63 by John Bird of Hammersmith but this proved to be too small, and the current church was started in 1888. The new church was opened in 1889 by Bernard O'Reilly, Bishop of Liverpool, to commemorate the Jubilee of Pope Leo XIII; it was not consecrated until 1932 when the debt had been cleared.

St. Joseph’s Church was designed by the architect Albert Vicars as blend of the Romanesque and Byzantine styles. The green, copper dome is the dominant feature and is a landmark that can be seen from various points across London. The dome is estimated to weigh 2000 tons. St Joseph’s Retreat, the house for the Passionist community, is attached to the east end.

== Interior ==
The Stations of the Cross are large painted oblong reliefs by F. Devriendt, installed in 1886.

=== The Sanctuary ===
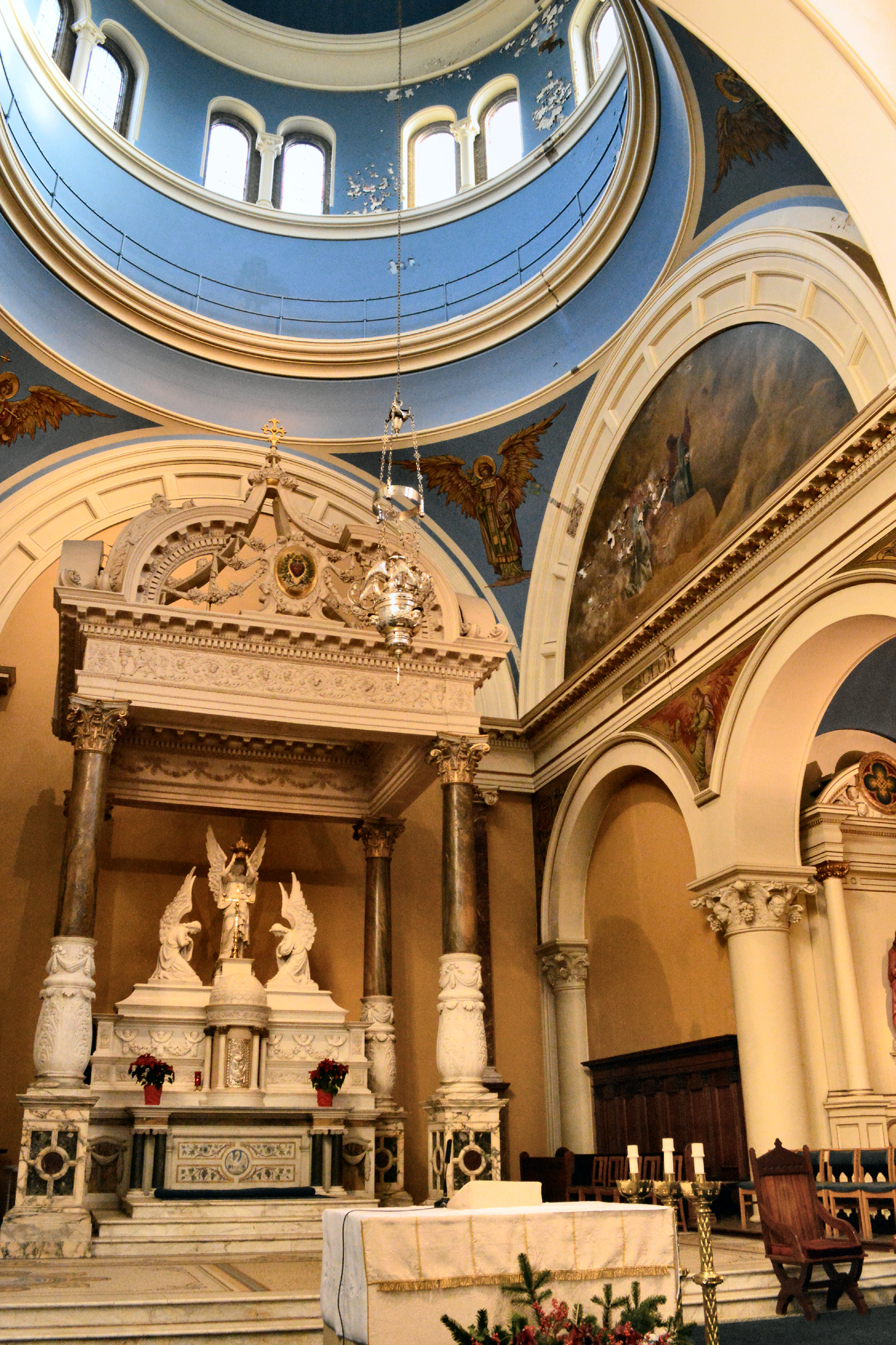
The sanctuary

The high altar has a canopy (or baldachino), made from Sicilian marble. The surrounds and dome of the tabernacle are a copy of the original wooden surrounds from 1861. The mosaic pavement in the sanctuary is made from rock from the bed of the River Severn.

The forward altar of marble and sandstone was erected in 1964 by Gerald Murphy of Burles Newton & Partners. The sanctuary wall paintings are by C. Langlin.

=== The Chapels ===
The northeast chapel is dedicated to the Passionist saints and has a painting of the St Paul of the Cross by M.A. Laby.

The Lady chapel is from 1958, the altar is of plain marble with a marble reredos with mosaics showing the Annunciation and Coronation of Mary. The Carrara marble statue of the Virgin (1897) is by Porter of Fulham and is from the earlier chapel. Next to the chapel is a wooden sculpture of St Dominic Barberi by John O’Rourke (1999).

The Sacred Heart chapel is at the southeast.

In St Michael’s Chapel the marble rails and elaborate altar were reputedly exhibited at the Paris Exhibition of 1889. The chapel was erected in memory of Rev. Michael Watts Russell, who died 1875, and there is a marble portrait plaque to him. The reliquary is said to have been designed by Cardinal Wiseman.

The Martyrs Chapel has a marble altar and rails, and an oil painting of the Forty Martyrs of England and Wales.

=== The Painted Ceiling ===
The segmental, vaulted ceiling was painted by Nathaniel Westlake (1891) and is some of his finest work. There are 250 panels, each segment contains an angel carrying a scroll with a verse from the Te Deum.

=== The Organ ===
The four-manual organ was built by William Hill & Sons in 1898 and installed after the Second World War as a memorial to the local victims of the Second World War.

=== Stained Glass ===
There are three stained glass clerestory windows on each side wall. Those on the south show the Crucifixion and those on the north the Holy Family. Between the windows are paintings by Westlake depicting the Mysteries of the Rosary.

== Gallery ==
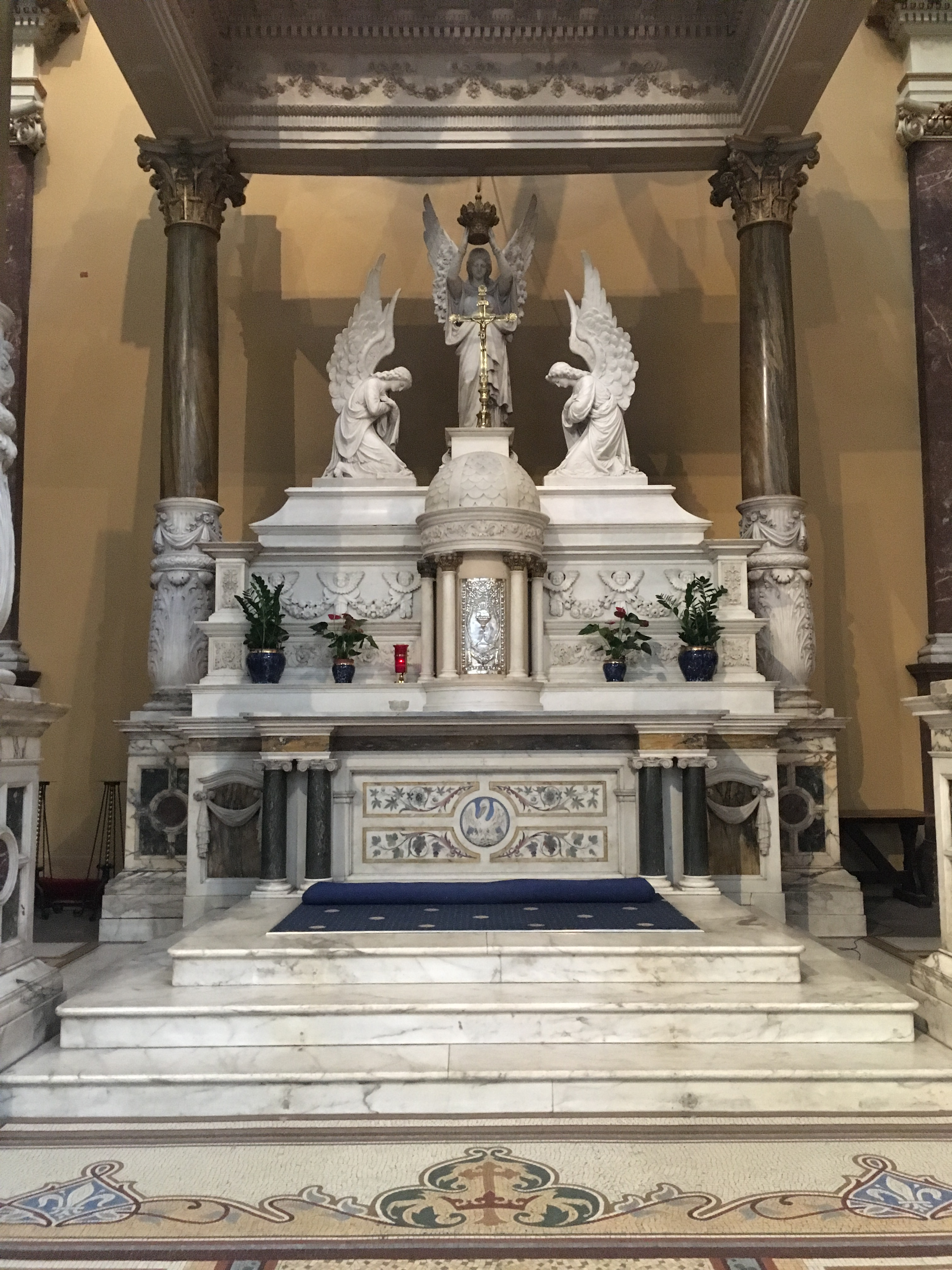
High altar

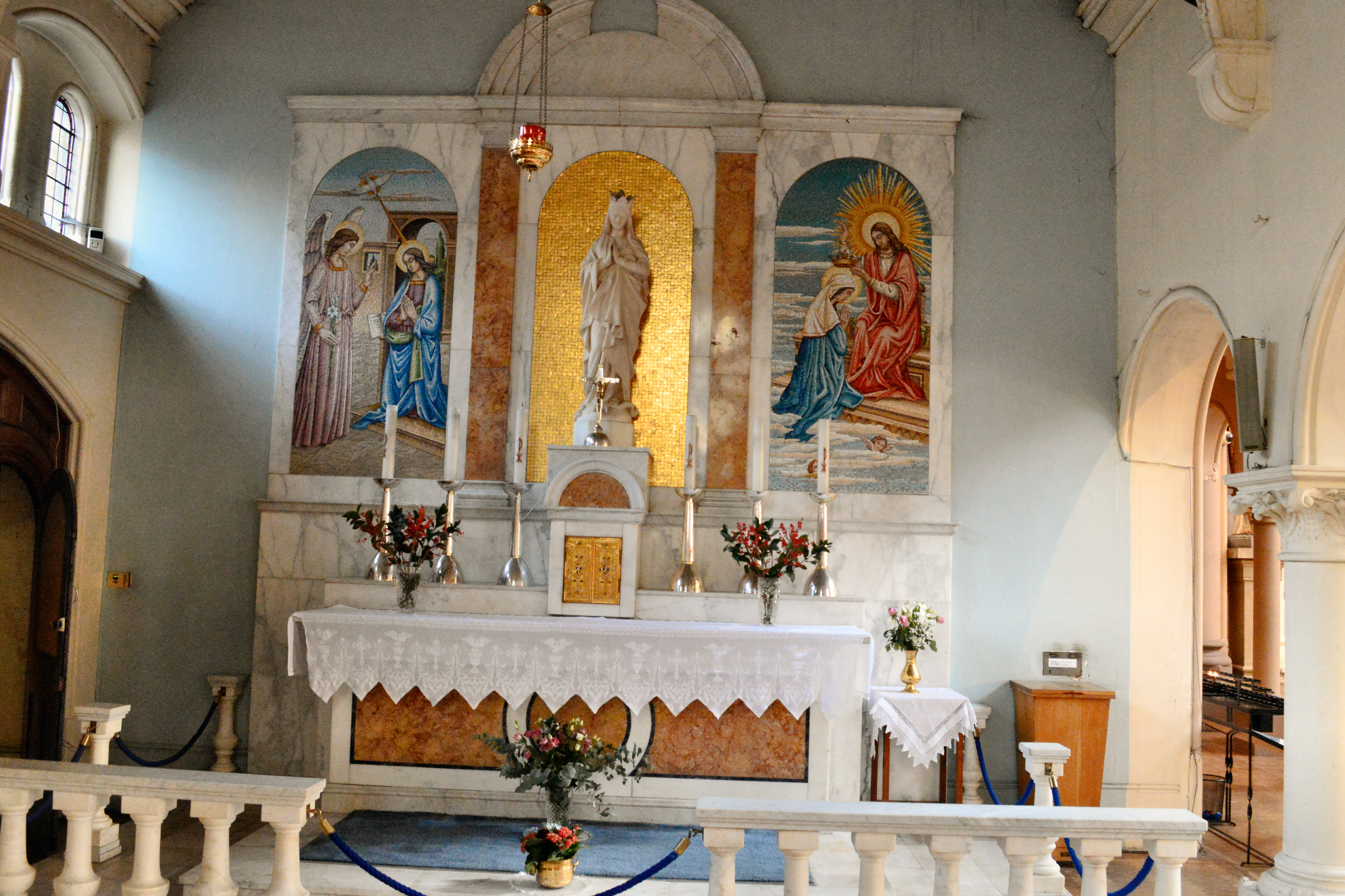
The Lady chapel

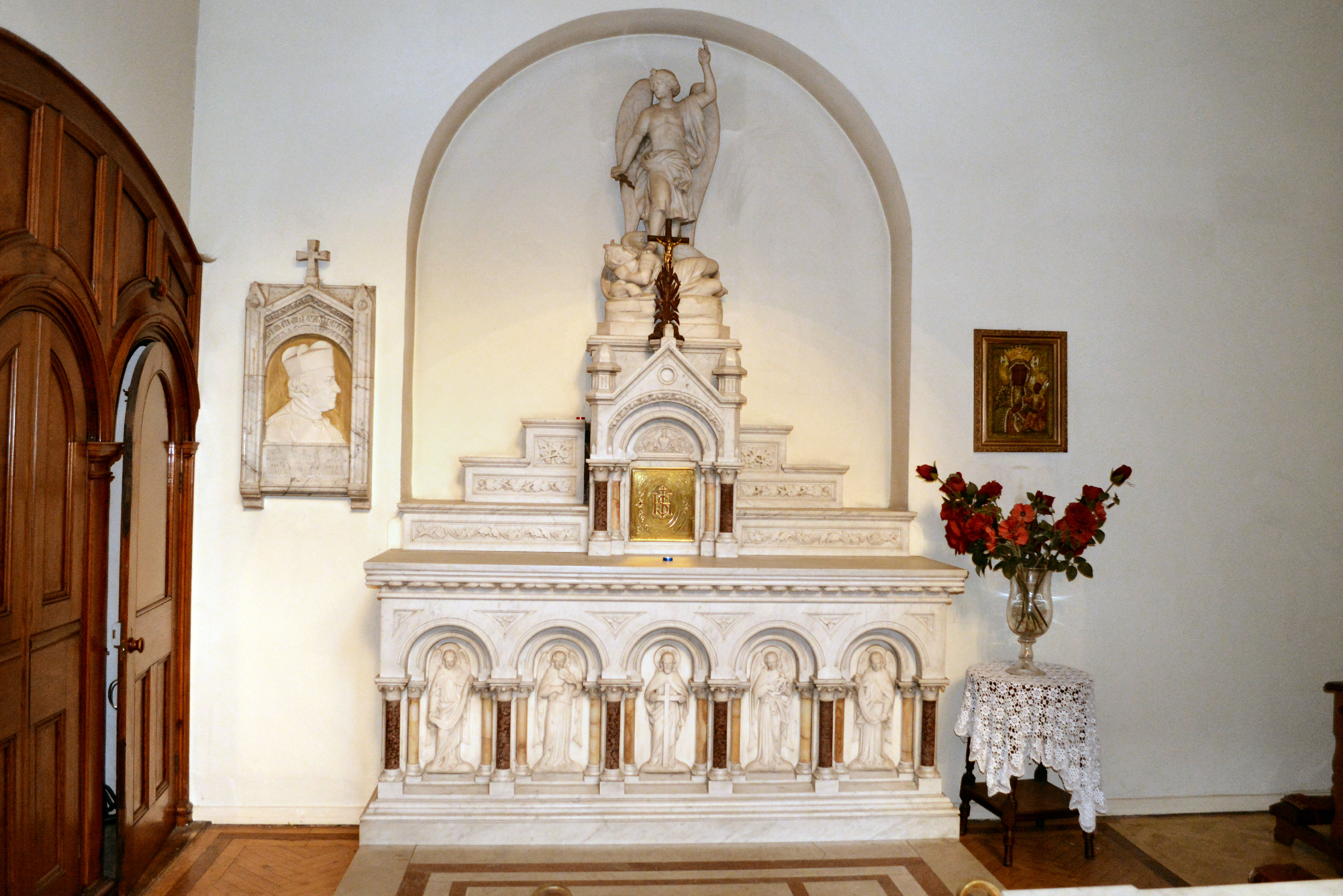
St Michael’s Chapel

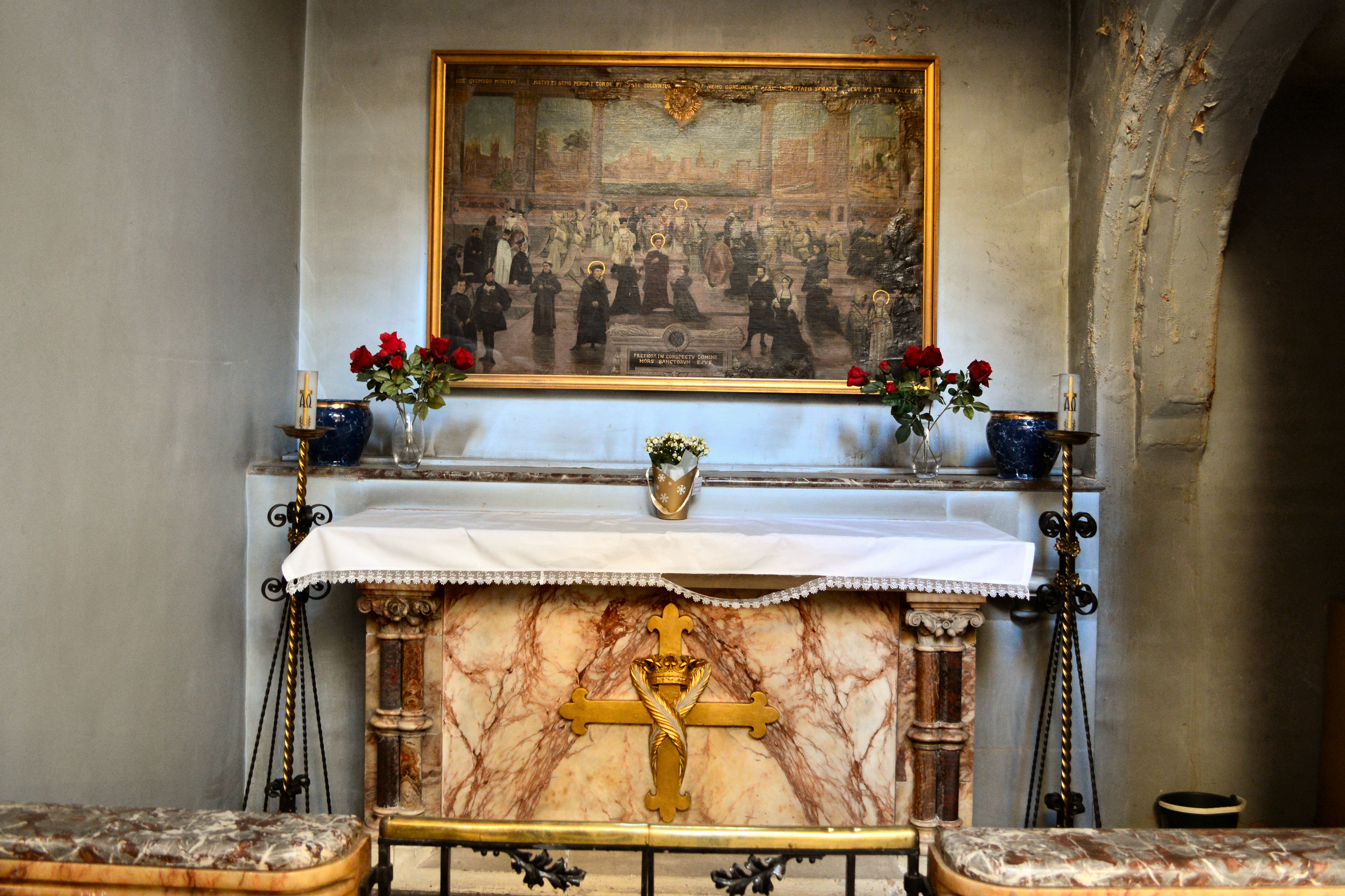
The Martyrs Chapel

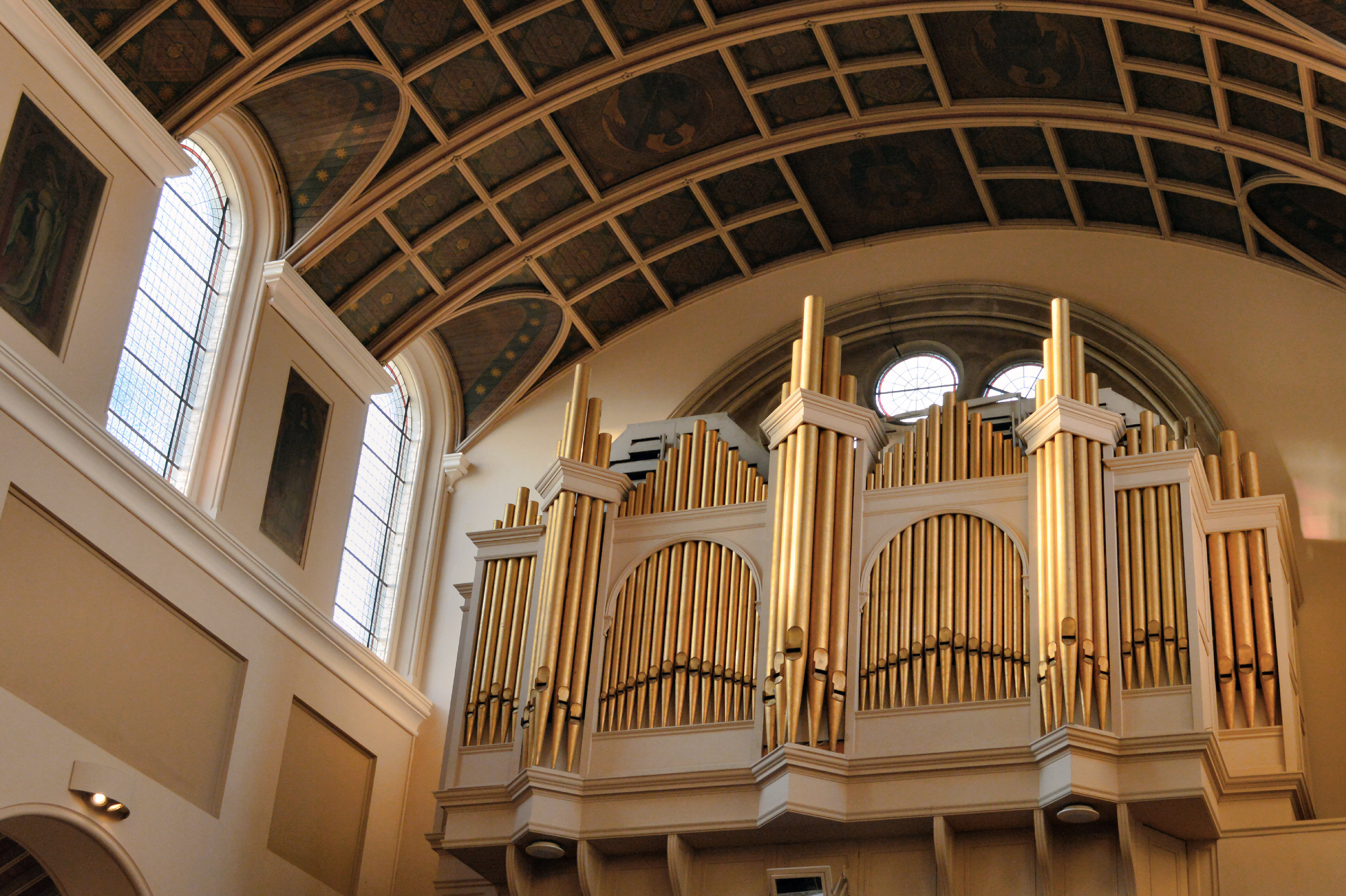
The Organ

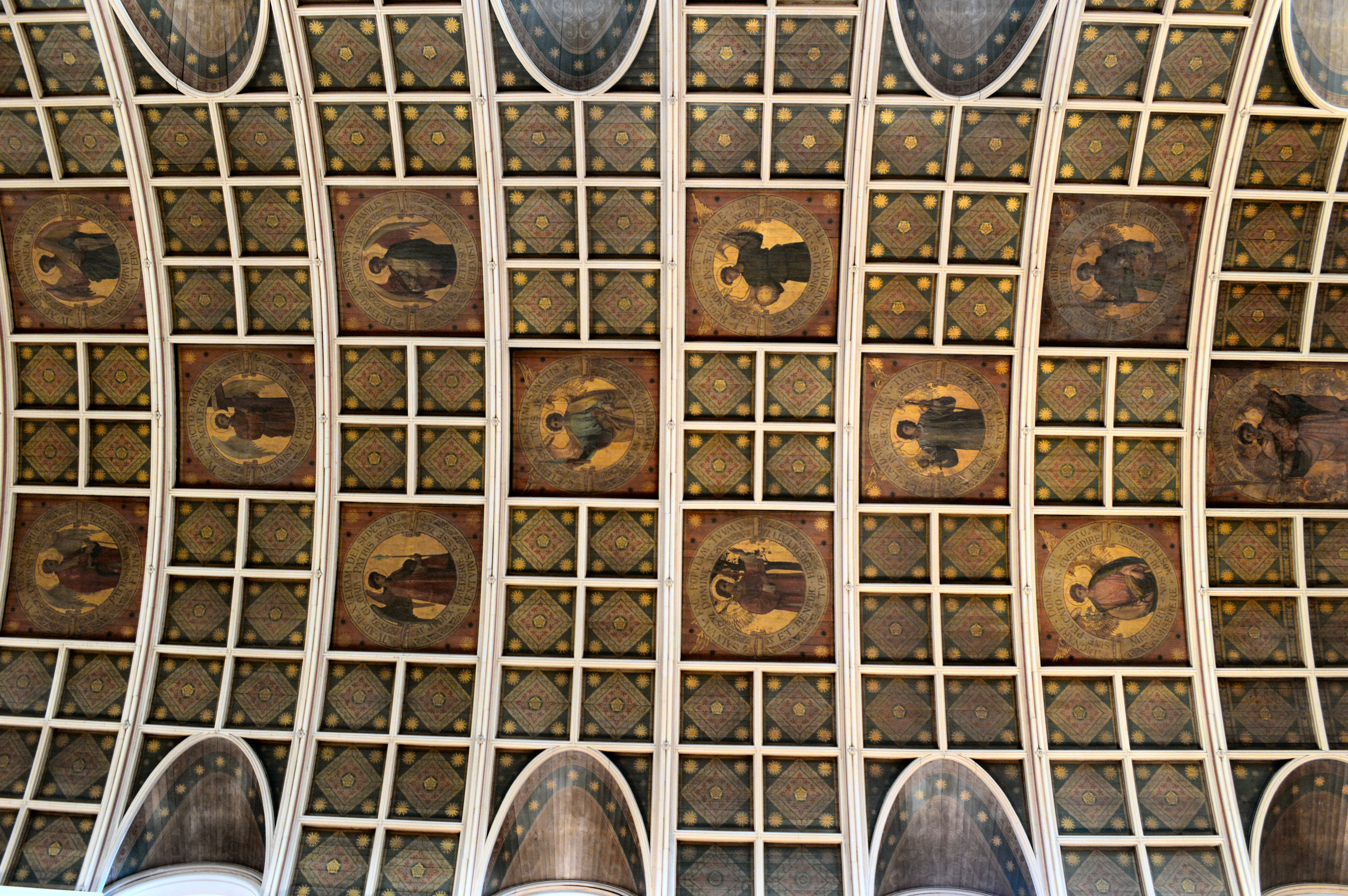
Part of the painted ceiling

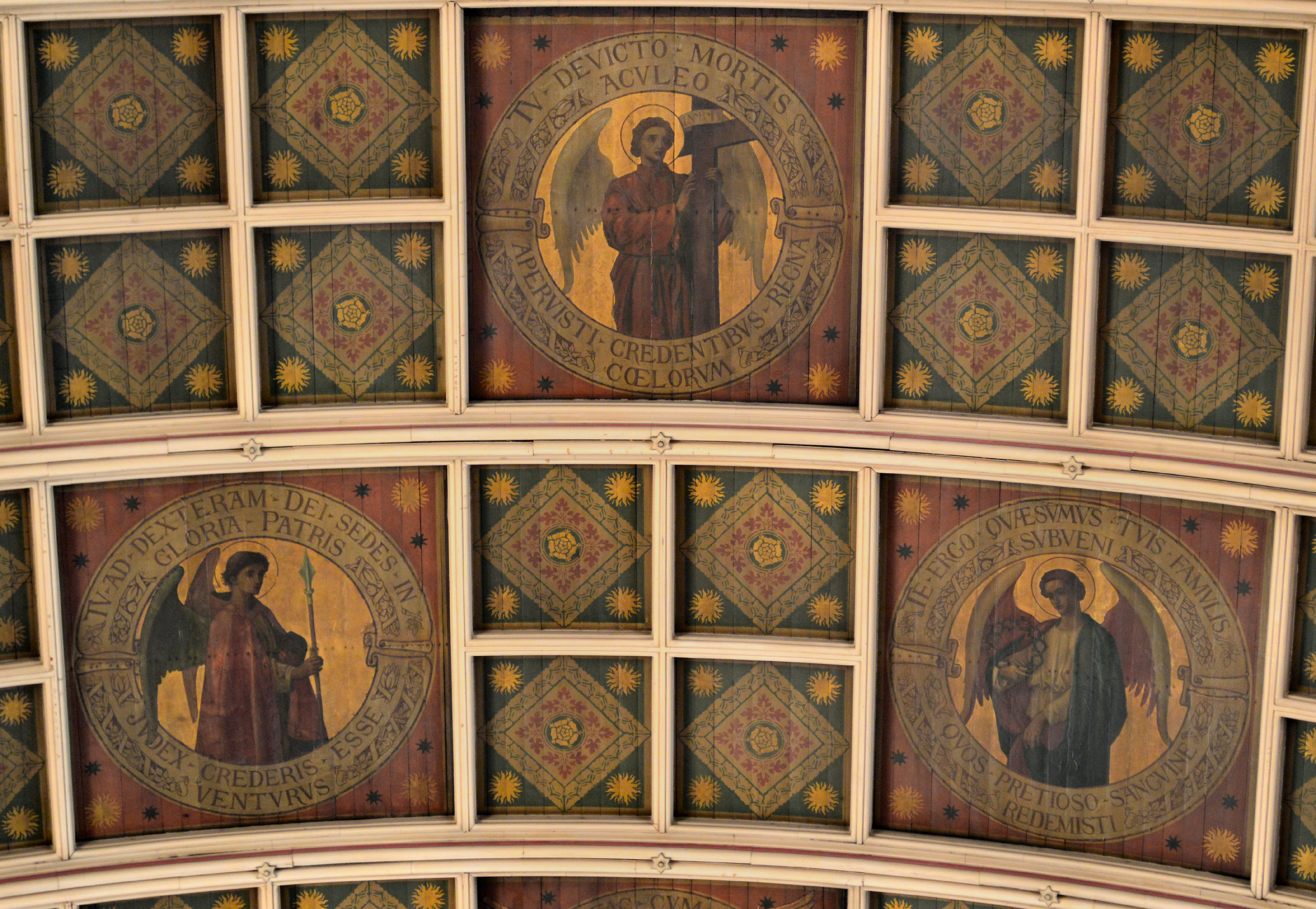
Painted ceiling detail
