= James Bunstone Bunning =

English architect

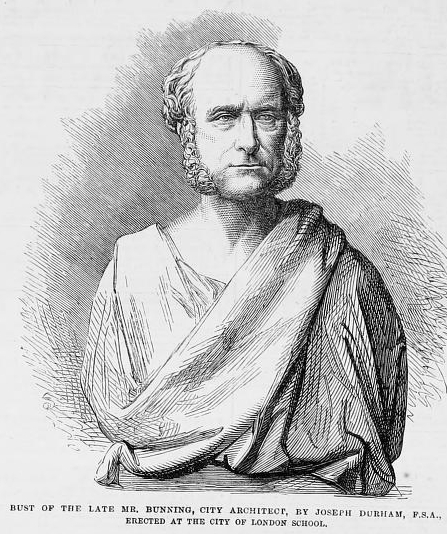
- Born: 6 October 1802
- Died: 2 November 1863 (aged 61)
- Occupation: Architect
- Known for: Coal Exchange

James Bunstone Bunning (6 October 1802 – 2 November 1863) was an English architect. He held the post of architect to the City of London from 1843 until his death, and is probably best remembered for his design for the Coal Exchange.

== Life ==
Bunning was born in London on 6 October 1802. He was trained in the office of his father, the surveyor Daniel James Bunning, from the age of thirteen. He was then articled to George Smith. He exhibited at the Royal Academy between 1819 and 1848., giving his address as Bernard Street between 1819 and 1823, and Guilford Street after 1832. He was a fellow of the Institute of British Architects, and of the Society of Antiquaries.

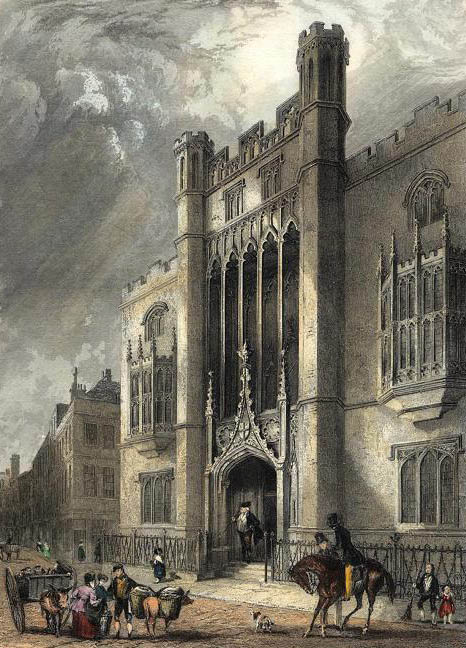
Bunning's City of London School (1835)

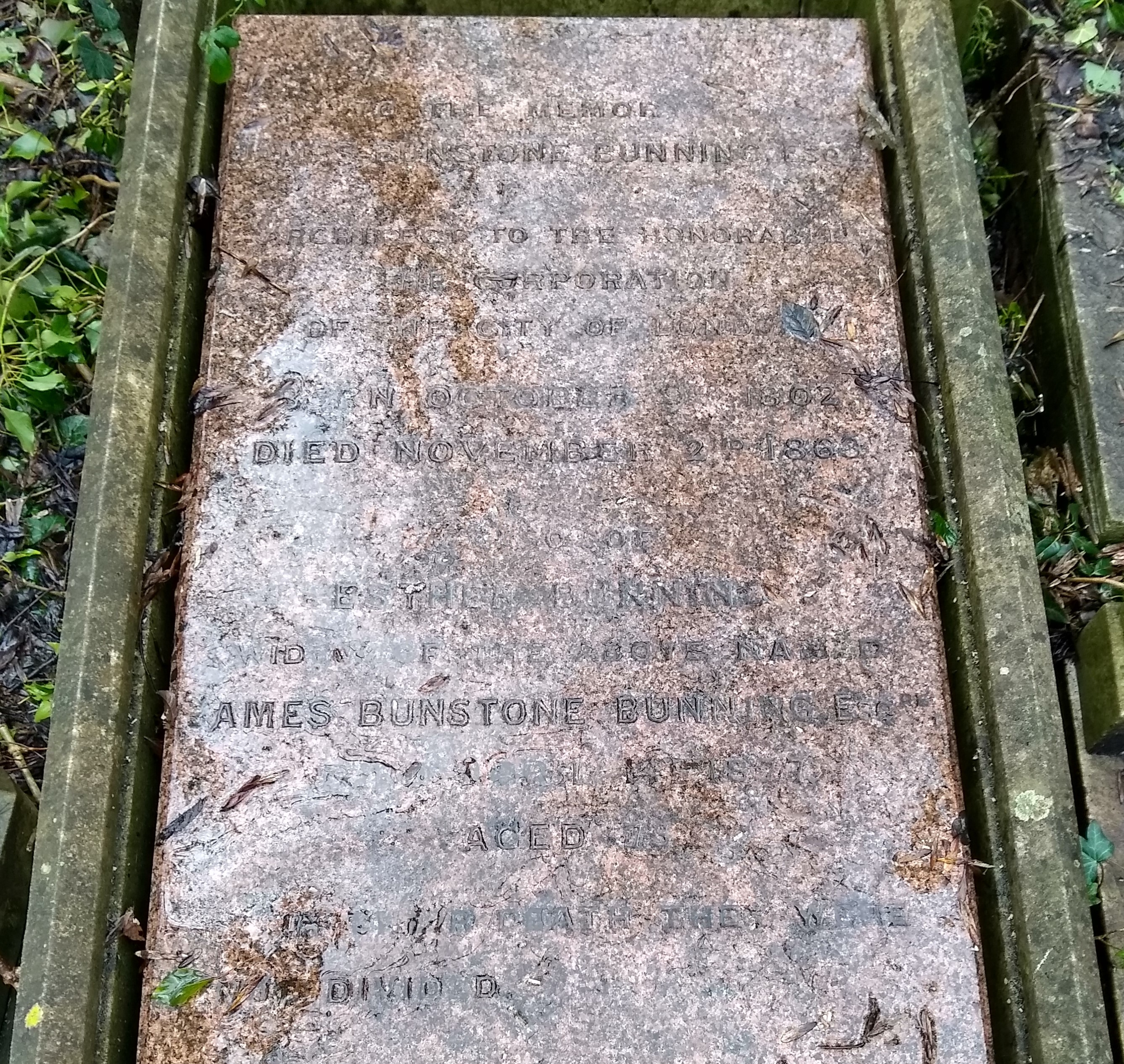
Grave of James Bunstone Bunning in Highgate Cemetery (west)

== Early career ==
Bunning was district surveyor for Bethnal Green, (where he built the workhouse in 1840-2), and, from around 1825, surveyor to the Foundling Hospital estates. He went on to hold the same post with the Haberdashers' Company, the London and County Bank, the Thames Tunnel, the Victoria Life Office and the Chelsea waterworks. For the Haberdashers he built the Five Bells Hotel, the Railway Tavern, Hatcham Terrace, Albert Terrace and other streets on the Company's estate at New Cross, and for the London and County Bank he built or converted many branches, including those at Chatham, Canterbury, Brighton and Leighton Buzzard.

In 1834 he built a "receiving house" – a first-aid post for people rescued from the water – by the Serpentine in Hyde Park for the Royal Humane Society. He won the commission in a competition, entered under a pseudonym, but, as a member of the committee of the society, waived his fee.

He also won the competition to build the new City of London School on the site of Honey Lane Market in Cheapside. Begun in October 1835, it was a Gothic building more than 180 feet long, accommodating 400 pupils. He also entered the competitions to rebuild the Royal Exchange and the Houses of Parliament. In 1839 he became surveyor to the London Cemetery Company for whom he did work at Highgate Cemetery, possibly including the design of the Terrace Catacombs (1842), and laid out Nunhead Cemetery (1840) and designed its gates and lodges.

Among the last works he did in private practice, before taking up his appointment with the Corporation of the City of London were the towers and parts of the approaches for Brunel's Hungerford Suspension Bridge.

== Architect to the City of London ==
In 1843, Bunning was appointed Clerk of the City's Works to the City of London in 1843, a post for which William Tite had also been a candidate. The title of the post was changed to City Architect in 1847. In this role he built the Coal Exchange in Thames Street (1849); the City Prison at Holloway, its front and gateway a ragstone imitation of Warwick Castle; Billingsgate Market (1853), in red brick and stone, in an Italianate style, with a central campanile; the Freemens' Orphans' Schools in Brixton, also Italianate and in red brick and stone (1852–54), and the Metropolitan Cattle Market in Islington, opened in 1855. He had previously made a design for remodeling the market on its existing site at Smithfield. The central clock tower, in what is now Caledonian Park, and two sets of railings are all that remain following the market’s closure and demolition in the early 1960s.

In 1856, he built two law courts at the Guildhall, and in 1858 began the complete reconstruction of Newgate prison, leaving only George Dance's outer walls intact. In 1858 he built Rogers' almshouses at Brixton and the Pauper Lunatic Asylum at Stone in Kent, both in a "domestic Gothic" style.

Much of his time as City architect was spent on work connected with the valuation, leasing and sale of the City estates. He also surveyed and planned many road improvements, including the building of New Cannon Street (opened in 1854). His unexecuted projects included one for the widening of London Bridge.

Thomas Leverton Donaldson, paying tribute to Bunning shortly after his death, said "Not content with the mere routine of official duty (which however he carried out zealously and with stern integrity), he had higher aims, and with an earnestness beyond all praise he directed his efforts to give his buildings for the city the stamp of a monumental character, worthy of the corporate body whom he represented", and called the central hall of Bunning's Coal Exchange "a grand feature, recalling the sentiment of an antique Roman building."

Another duty was to provide decorations for the annual Lord Mayor's banquet, and for state occasions in the City. His last work was the decoration of London Bridge and other buildings for the ceremonial welcome of Princess Alexandra of Denmark to London. During this time his health broke down and he tendered his resignation from his post with the City of London, which was not accepted.

== Family ==
In 1826, he married Esther Basan, who was of Italian origin. She survived him and they had no children.

== Death ==
Bunning died at his home in Gloucester Terrace, Regent's Park, on 2 November 1863. A street in Islington is named after him. He is buried with his wife in Highgate Cemetery (west side).
