= Stone House Hospital =

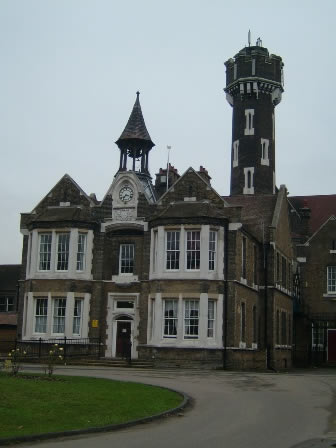
- Administration block of the hospital

- Shown in Kent

Geography
- Location: Dartford, Kent, England, United Kingdom
- Coordinates: 51°26′44″N 0°14′41″E

Organisation
- Care system: Public NHS
- Type: Specialist

Services
- Speciality: Mental health

History
- Founded: 1866
- Closed: 2005

Links
- Lists: Hospitals in England

Stone House Hospital was a hospital and former mental illness treatment facility in Stone, near Dartford, Kent, in the United Kingdom.

== History ==
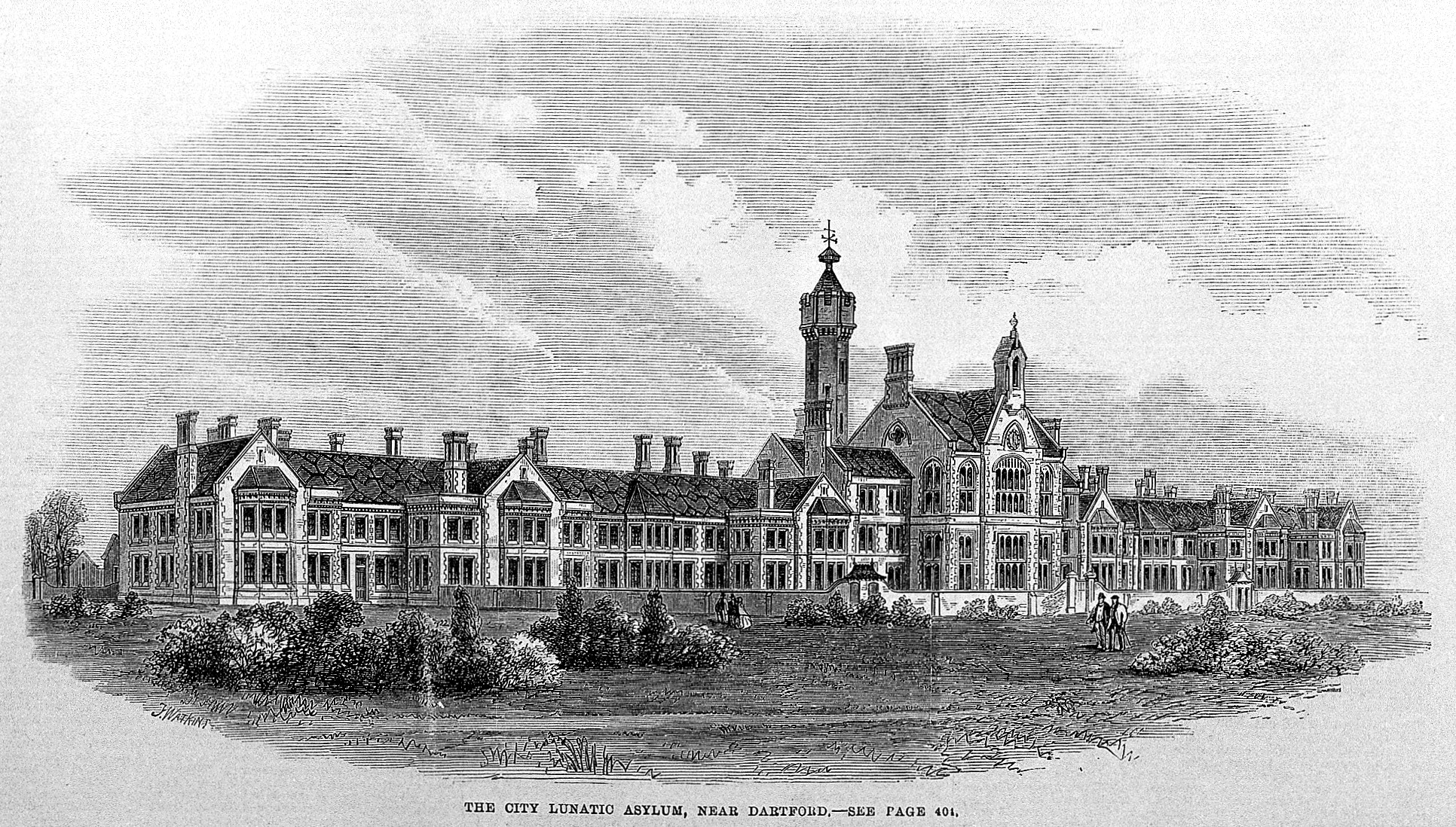
The City Lunatic Asylum, near Dartford, in 1866

Stone House was originally constructed between 1862 and 1866 at the behest of the London Commissioners in Lunacy to provide for destitute mentally ill patients from the London area at a cost of £65,000. The buildings were designed in a Tudor Revival architecture style by James Bunstone Bunning, and the facility accommodated 220 patients. The asylum grounds, at first 33 acres (130,000 m^{2}) and later expanded to 140 acres (0.57 km^{2}), included a working farm. It opened as the City of London Lunatic Asylum in April 1866.

Additions to the original buildings were made in 1874, 1878, and 1885, including an expanded female wing and a separate hospital building for patients with infectious diseases. After 1892, the asylum was able to take "private" patients (patients whose fees were paid by their families, or from pensions). The influx of private patients resulted in a budget surplus, and enabled expansion and improvements of the asylum's facilities.

The first medical superintendent of the Asylum was Dr. Octavius Jepson, who served from the opening of the facility until 1887; on his death twelve years later, he was buried in the asylum's cemetery. He was succeeded by Dr. Ernest White, who served until his retirement in 1904. The third superintendent was Dr. Robert Hunter Steen, who was in turn succeeded in 1924 by Dr. William Robinson. Robinson retired in 1942, but due to wartime staff shortages his permanent replacement, Dr. Hardwick, was not appointed until 1946; on the takeover by the National Health Service his new title became Physician Superintendent, which brought additional powers and responsibilities.

Among its most famous patients was the poet and composer Ivor Gurney, who arrived in 1922 and resided there until his death. The facility was renamed the City of London Mental Hospital in 1924 and it joined the National Health Service as Stone House Hospital in 1948.

After the hospital closed in 2005, English Partnerships sought bids for its redevelopment into luxury flats in 2007 and the main hospital, staff residences and chapel have since been converted for residential use.

== See also ==
- Healthcare in Kent

== Bibliography ==
- Payne, Francine (2007). Stone House: City of London Asylum. DWS Print Services. ISBN 978-0955646003.
