= George Meehan House =

Municipal building in London, England

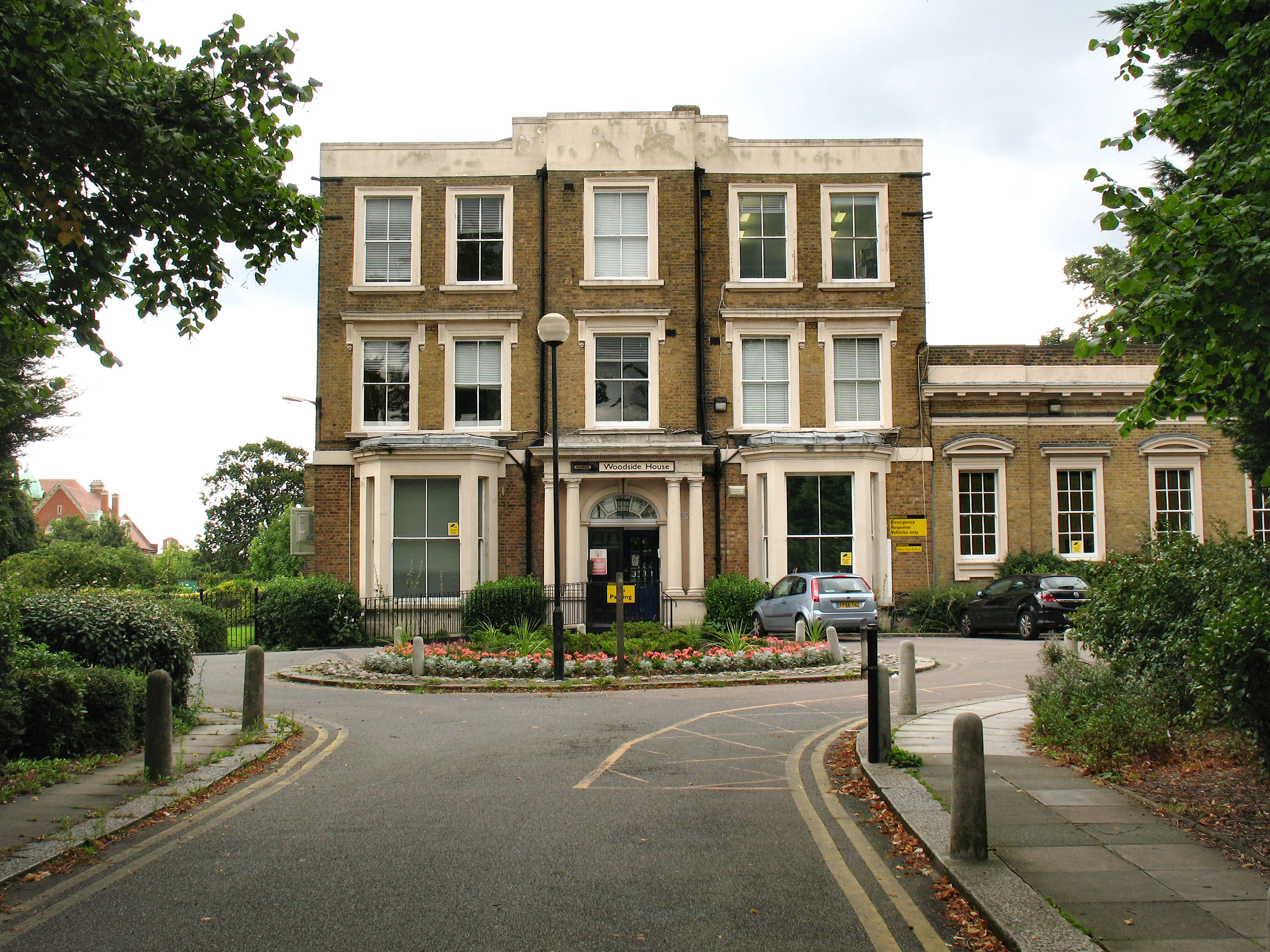
- George Meehan House

- Shown in Haringey
- 51.6036°N 0.1107°W
- Location: High Road, Wood Green

History
- Built: 1865

Site notes
- Architectural style: Italianate style

George Meehan House (formerly known as Earlham Grove House, later Woodside House) is a municipal building in High Road, Wood Green, London. It is surrounded by a public park known as Woodside Park and is a locally listed building.

== History ==
The building, which was designed in the Italianate style, was built as a private residence for Thomas William Smith Oakes, an East India Company merchant; it was initially known as Earlham Grove House and was completed in 1865. The design involved a symmetrical main frontage with three bays facing onto High Road; the central section featured a doorway with fanlight flanked by paired Doric order columns on either side on the ground floor; there were single windows on each of the first and second floors above the doorway. The philanthropist Catherine Smithies, who founded the Band of Mercy animal welfare group which later merged with the RSPCA, lived in the house in the mid-19th century. Her son, Thomas Bywater Smithies, who was the publisher of The British Workman, also lived in the house at that time.

The house was acquired by the local board of health for use as a public library in 1893 and it then became the offices of Wood Green Urban District Council in 1913. It was expanded with a single storey extension of five extra bays to the south at that time. Internally, the principal room in the extension was the council chamber but a mayor's parlour and a court for the local petty sessions were also created in the complex.

The building went on to become the headquarters of the Municipal Borough of Wood Green when the area secured municipal borough status in 1933. The house remained the local town hall until the council moved to Wood Green Civic Centre in March 1958. Its role subsequently changed to that of a local register office for Haringey Council under the name Woodside House.

The house was extensively refurbished by T&B Contractors at a cost of £4 million between September 2017 and June 2018. It was renamed George Meehan House, in memory of Councillor George Meehan, a former leader of Haringey Council, in 2018. The Earlham Suite at George Meehan House remains an approved venue for marriages and civil partnership ceremonies.
