= Bounds Green Road =

Street in the London Borough of Haringey

Coordinates: 51°36′22.8″N 0°7′24.18″W

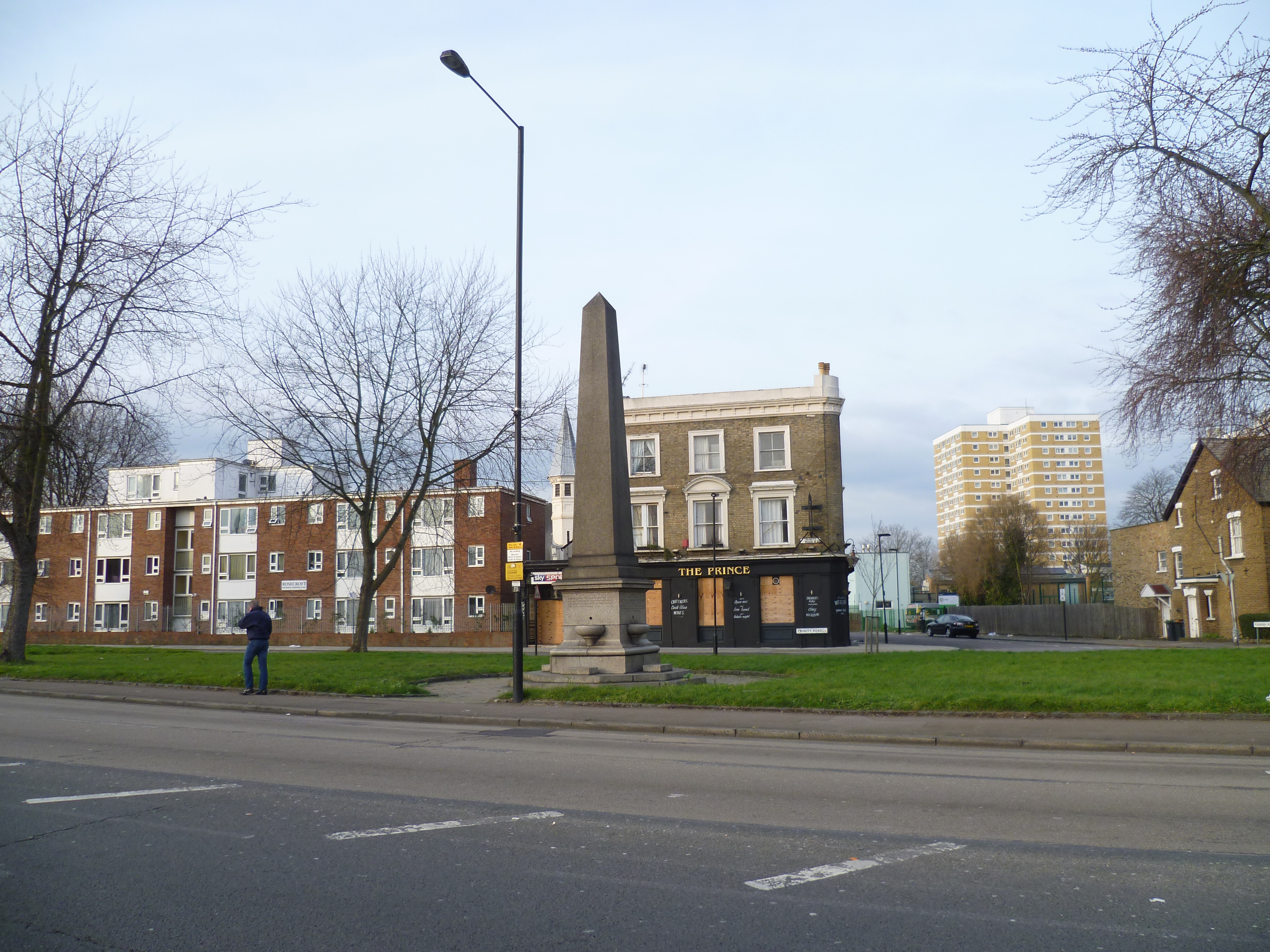
Bounds Green Road with the Catharine Smithies obelisk and drinking fountain in the background

Bounds Green Road (A109) is a road in the London Borough of Haringey that runs from the junction of Station Road and the North Circular Road in Bounds Green, to the High Road in Wood Green.

== Notable buildings ==
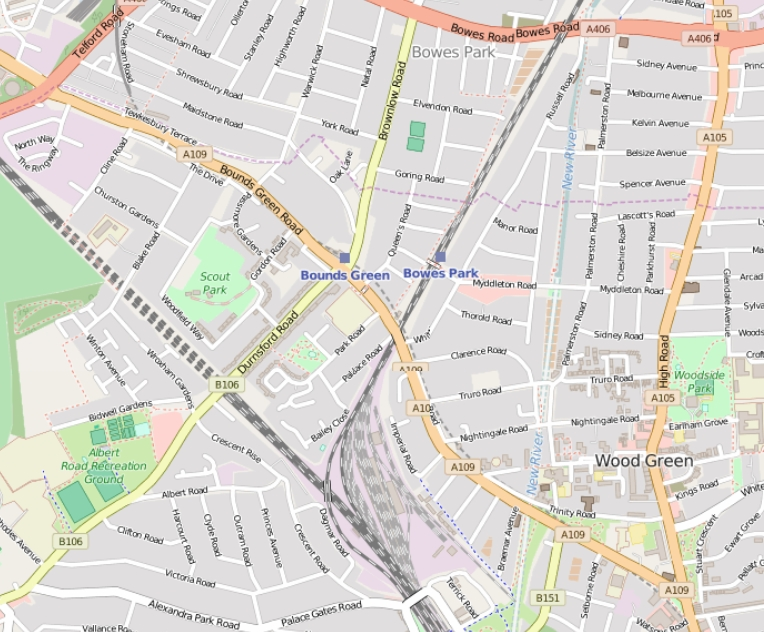
The vicinity of Bounds Green Road

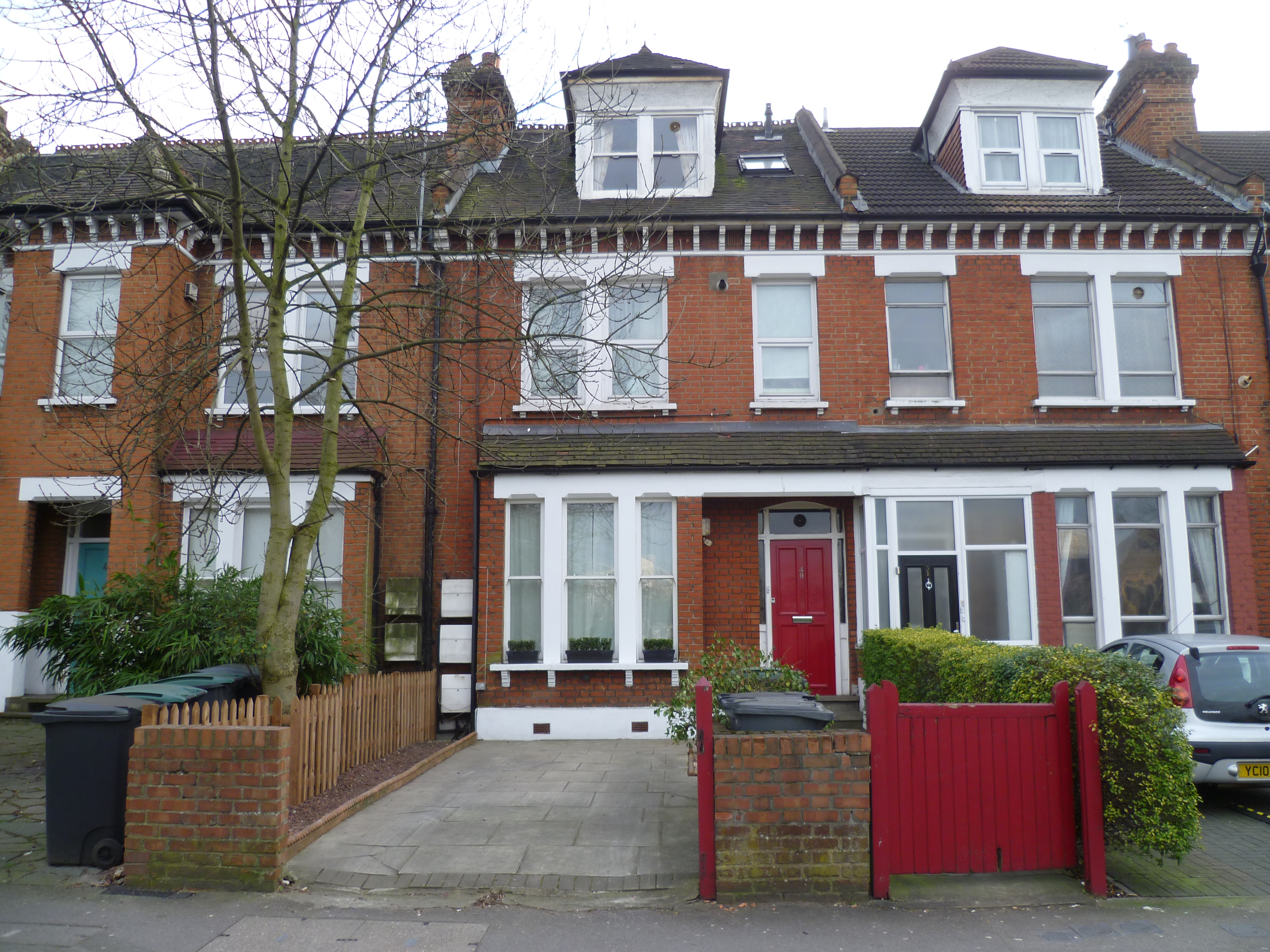
Modern view of Galton's childhood home (centre) in Wood Green, London

Among the notable buildings in the road are:

- Bounds Green Underground Station
- Braemar Avenue Baptist Church which faces Bounds Green Road and is Grade II listed
- 7 & 9 Bounds Green Road, which are Grade II listed houses
- The Catharine Smithies obelisk on Trinity Gardens on the east side
- The former home of communist and university administrator Dorothy Galton (1901–1992) at number 49
- St. Michael and All Angels Church, Wood Green
- Trinity Primary Academy, a Grade II listed school
