= 7 and 9 Bounds Green Road =

Grade II listed buildings in Wood Green, London

Coordinates: 51°35′57″N 0°06′44″W

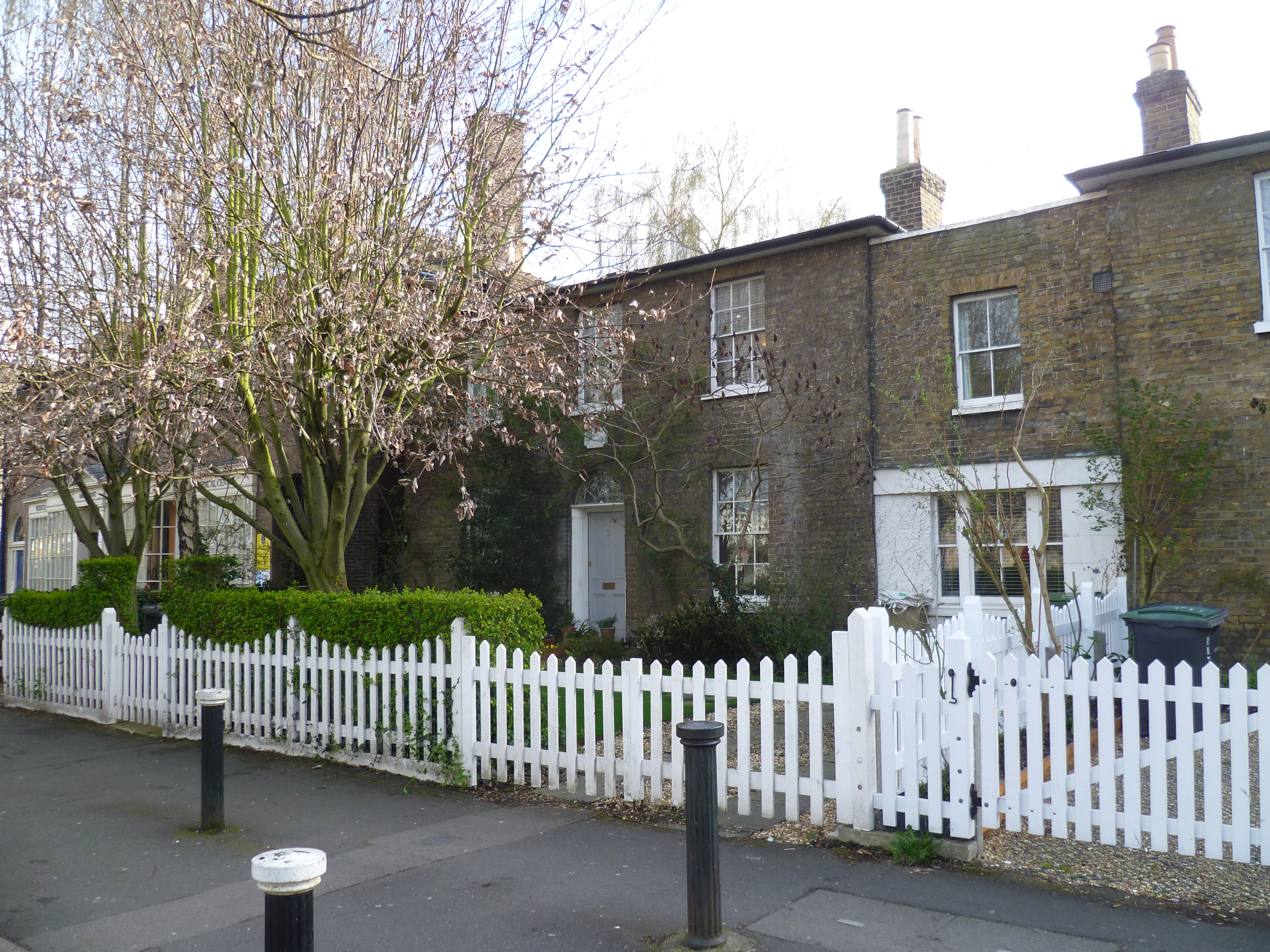
7 Bounds Green Road

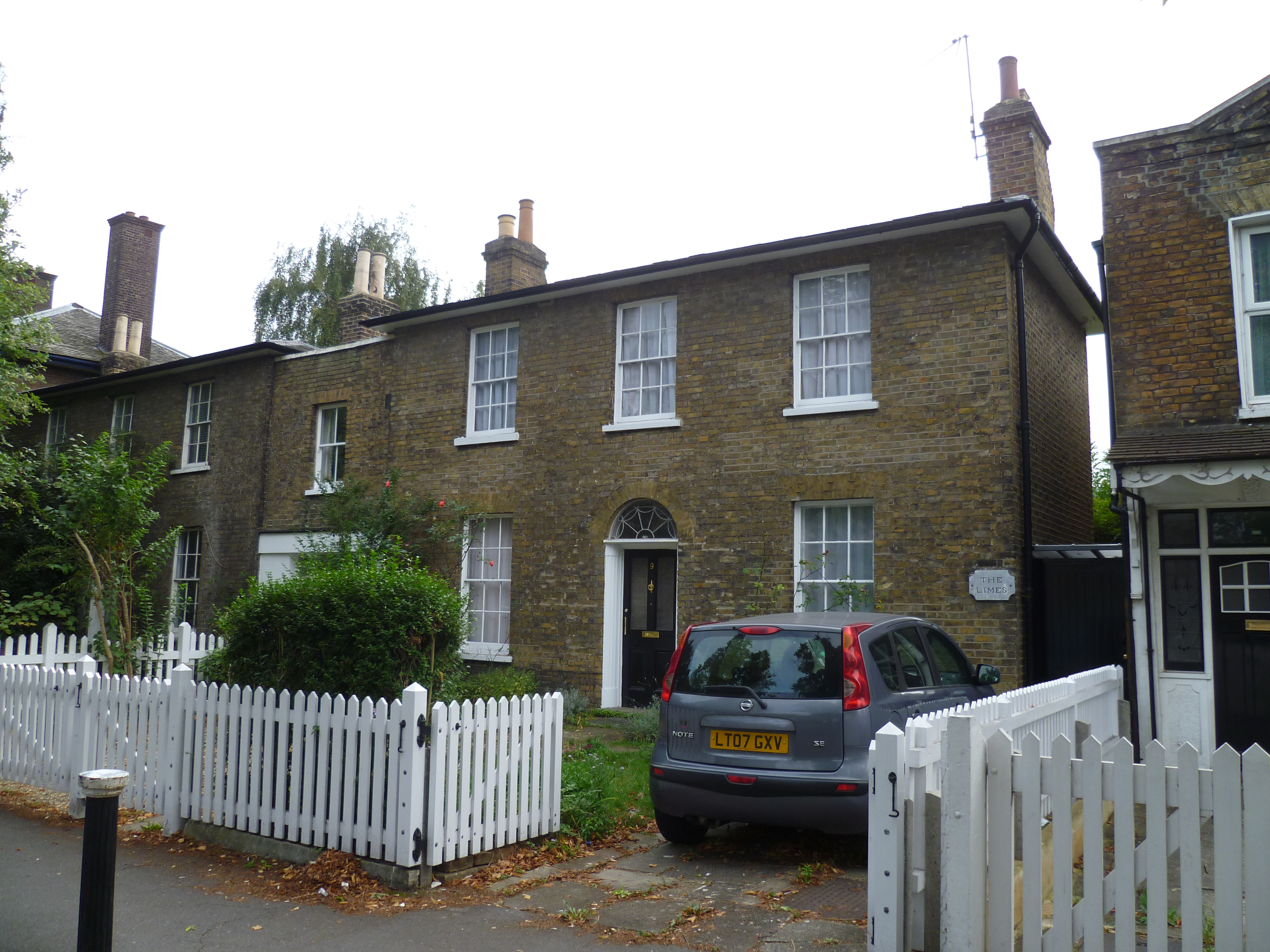
9 Bounds Green Road

7 and 9 Bounds Green Road are Grade II listed buildings in Wood Green, London. The houses form a group with numbers 7 to 25 (odd) in Bounds Green Road. Number 7 is an early nineteenth century two-storey villa with a patterned radial fan-light above the front door. It has been extended on the right with a one bay coachhouse that joins it to number 9, now known as The Limes, which is of similar design. Both are of yellow brick.

The houses are some of the oldest in Wood Green, which has few listed buildings. Opposite is St Michael and All Angels Church, which is also Grade II listed but was built slightly later (1843).
