= Woodside Park, Haringey =

Park in London, England

Coordinates: 51.6042°N 0.1108°W

Woodside Park
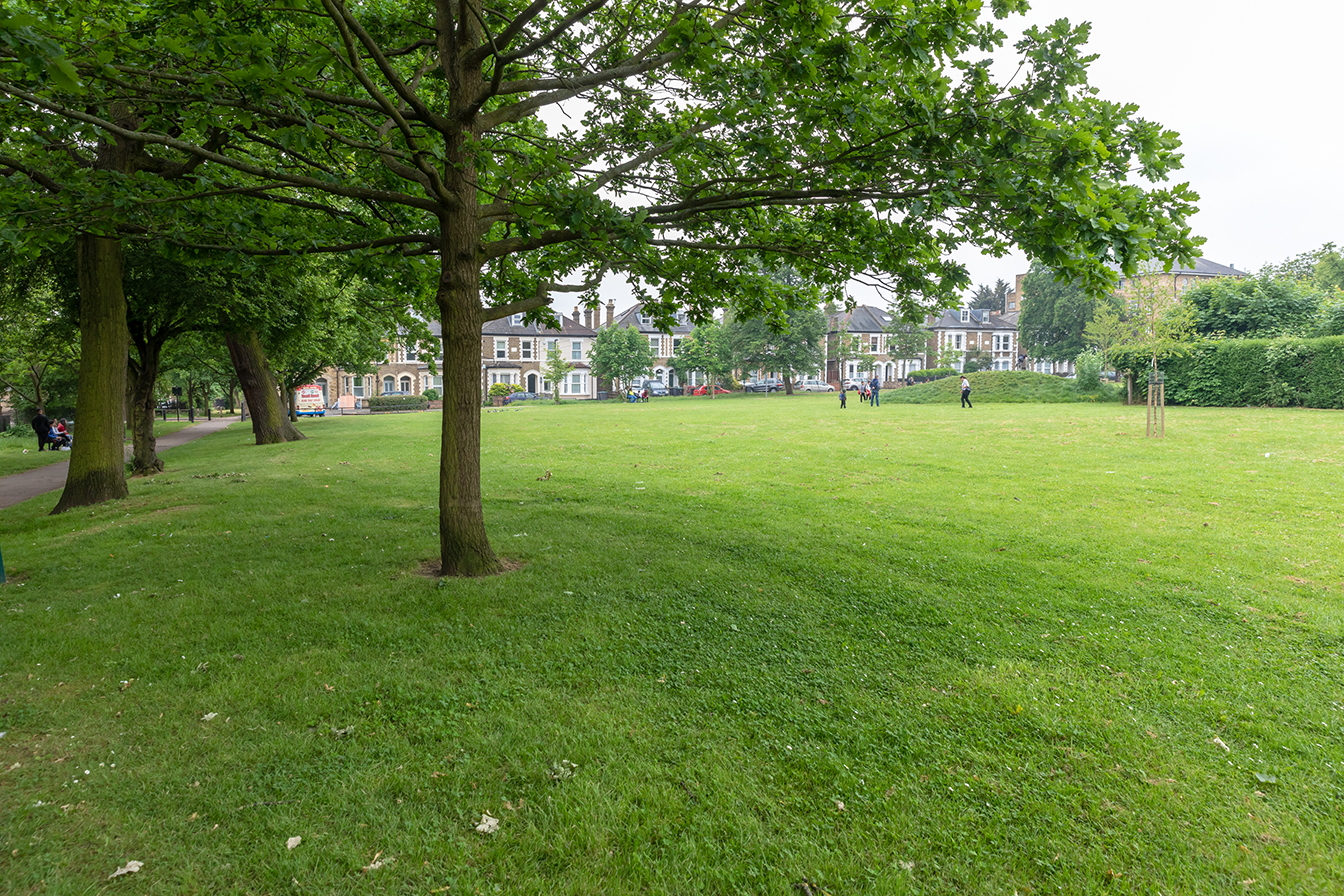
- Interactive map of Woodside Park
- Location: Wood Green London, N22
- Area: 3.8 hectares (9.4 acres)
- Opened: 1914
- Designer: unknown
- Operator: London Borough of Haringey
- Open: 24 hours
- Awards: Green Flag Award since 2016
- Public transit: Wood Green Tube, Buses - 29, 121, 232, 329, W3, W4

Woodside Park is a public park in Wood Green. The site was originally part of the much larger Chitts Hill Estate which covered a large part of Wood Green and beyond. Most of what later became the park was developed as Earlham Grove House and grounds in 1865.

== History ==
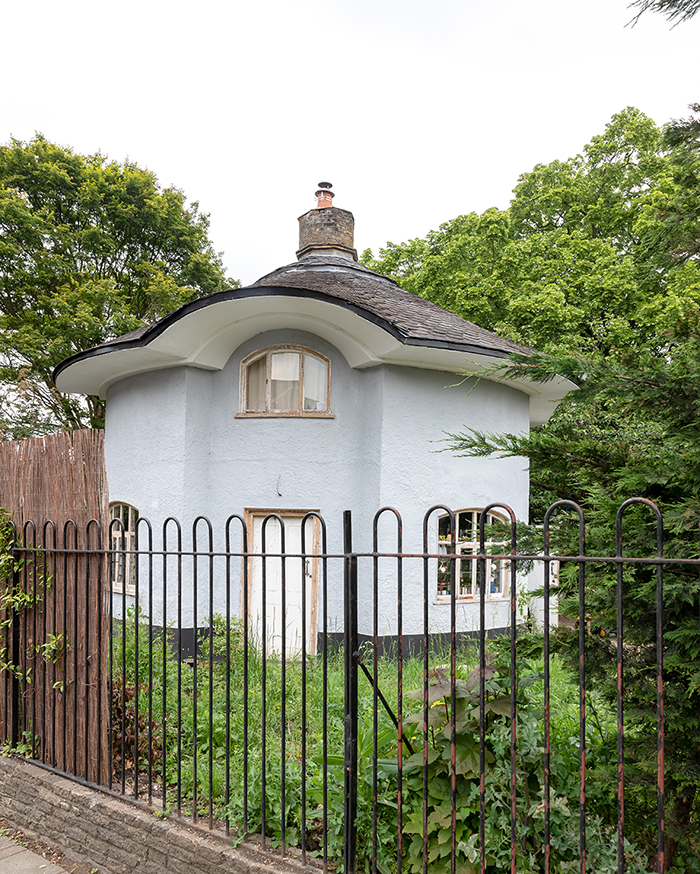
"Round House" or "Mushroom House". Built in 1822 as the gatehouse for Chitts Hill House.

The site was originally part of the much larger Chitts Hill Estate which covered a large part of Wood Green and beyond. Most of the park itself became part of Earlham Grove House, which was built in 1865. Former occupants include philanthropist Catherine Smithies (1785–1877), who founded the Bands of Mercy animal welfare group which later merged with the RSPCA.

Wood Green local board of health purchased Earlham Grove House with 11 acres of land in 1893. The park was laid out and by 1914 boasted a bandstand (demolished at some point between 1957 and 1973). A pavilion was erected by the bowling green before 1935.

== Facilities ==
The park has a mix of open ground, trees, a play area, a bowling club and a sensory garden. There are also a number of important buildings in the park, including:

- George Meehan House - formerly Woodside House and, before that, Earlham Grove House
- Mushroom House or Round House - the former gate house to Chitts Hill House, built in 1822 and now Grade II listed.
- The old pavilion - now used as a privately run children's nursery
- I Can Care Building - providing for the Asian elderly
- Fatisa - a restaurant
