= Heartlands High School =

Heartlands High School can refer to:

- Heartlands High School, Birmingham
- Heartlands High School, London
