= Fishmongers Arms =

Former public house in London, England

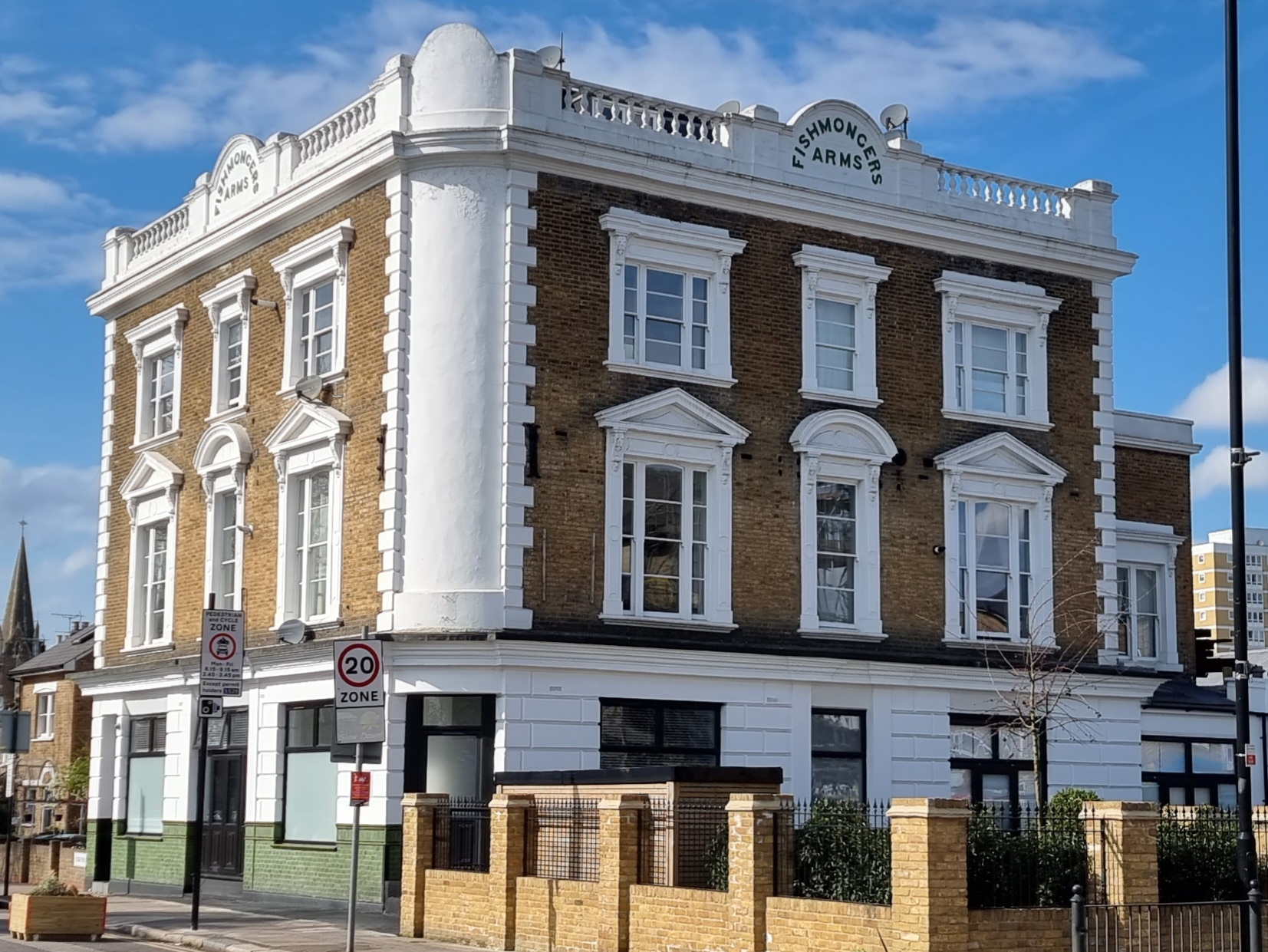
- The Fishmongers Arms

- Location within London Borough of Haringey Location within Greater London

General information
- Location: 287 High Road, Wood Green, London, England
- Coordinates: 51.6009°N 0.1120°W
- Opened: 1855
- Closed: 2000s

Magazine listing for the Wood Green Jazz Club in 1950

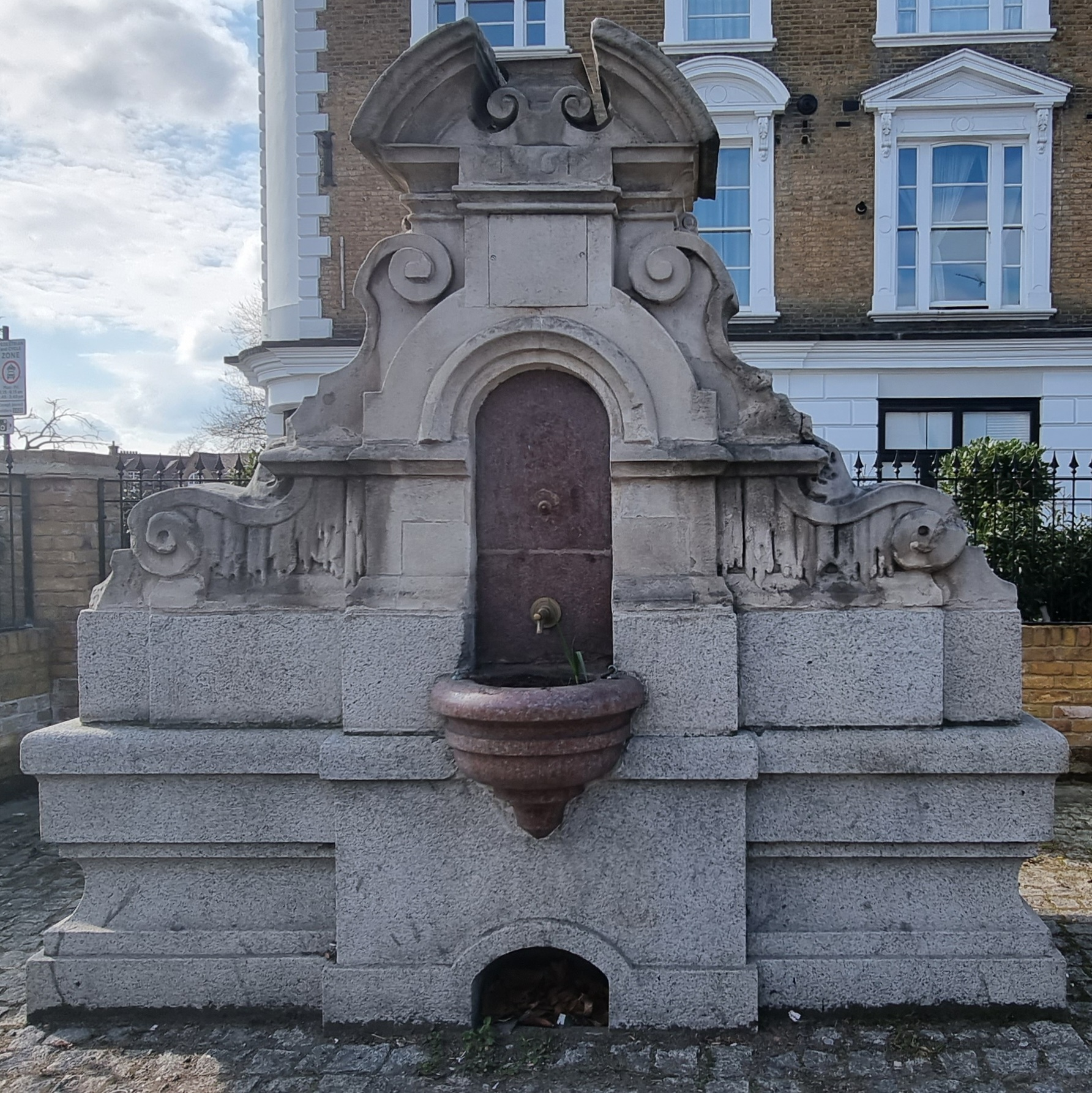
The drinking fountain on High Road, Wood Green

The Fishmongers Arms is a former public house in Wood Green in the London Borough of Haringey. Built in 1855 on the site of the former Wood Green Farm, Its name derived from the adjacent Fishmongers' and Poulterers' Almshouses, which were demolished in 1956 for the construction of the Haringey Civic Centre.

At the rear of the building was Bourne Hall, a dance hall built in the 1920s, which in the 1940s became the venue for the Wood Green Jazz Club. The club was captured in the 1956 BFI-funded documentary film Momma Don't Allow. In the 1950s, two of the pub's upstairs rooms hosted "The Deb-On-Air Charm School", while a third was used for jazz band practice by musicians including Humphrey Lyttleton and Wally "Trog" Fawkes.

During the 1960s the pub was a rock music venue, and hosted early performances by musicians and bands including John Mayall's Blues Breakers, Cream, Zoot Money, Graham Bond, Brian Auger, Julie Driscoll, Long John Baldry, Joe Cocker, Rod Stewart, Fleetwood Mac, Ten Years After, The Groundhogs, The Kinks, Led Zeppelin, Jethro Tull, and Pink Floyd. The pub and club later became The Barracuda, and in 1971 Fagans. It was known as O'Rafferty's at the time of its closure in the 2000s. The building was subsequently converted into flats.

On the High Road side is a Grade II listed cattle trough and drinking fountain constructed for the Metropolitan Drinking Fountain and Cattle Trough Association in 1901.
