= Catherine Smithies =

English philanthropist and social reformer (c. 1796–1877)

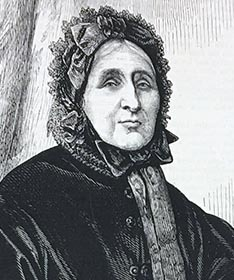
- Smithies, from an obituary
- Born: Catherine Bywater c. 1796; Tadcaster, Yorkshire, England
- Died: 25 October 1877 (aged 82); Earlham Grove House, Wood Green, England
- Resting place: Abney Park Cemetery, London, England
- Occupations: Philanthropist; social reformer
- Spouse: James Smithies (m. 1812; died 1861)
- Children: 10, including Thomas Bywater Smithies

Catherine Smithies (née Bywater; c. 1796 – 25 October 1877) was an English philanthropist and social reformer active in animal welfare, abolitionism, and temperance. She founded the first Band of Mercy, which taught children kindness to animals and became the model for the wider Bands of Mercy movement.

== Biography ==
=== Early life and family ===
Catherine Bywater was born around 1796 in Tadcaster, Yorkshire. She later lived in Leeds.

In 1812, she married James Smithies at St Peter's Church, Leeds. Her son, Thomas Bywater Smithies (1817–1883), the second of ten children, was born in 1817; he later worked with her in abolitionist and temperance causes.

After her husband's death in 1861, Smithies moved to London to live with Thomas at Earlham Grove House, Wood Green, which was built around 1865.

=== Philanthropy and social reform ===
Smithies was a Methodist, and her religious beliefs shaped her reform work. She was a member of the Band of Hope, a temperance organisation founded in Leeds in 1847 that encouraged children to abstain from alcohol through hymns, talks, and activities. Her work with the Band of Hope provided a model for her later humane education work.

In the 1860s, Smithies wrote A Mother's Lessons on Kindness to Animals, which was published in several volumes. In 1870, with Angela Burdett-Coutts, she founded the Ladies Committee of the RSPCA.

=== Founding the Band of Mercy ===
In 1875, Smithies established the first Band of Mercy, modelled on the Band of Hope but devoted to animal welfare. The organisation asked members to take the pledge: "I will try to be kind to all living creatures, and try to protect them from cruel usage."

The Band of Mercy held meetings and used storytelling, hymns, and lantern-slide presentations. The movement spread to other countries, including Australia and the United States. Its publications included the Band of Mercy Advocate, edited and produced by Thomas Bywater Smithies.

=== Death and commemoration ===
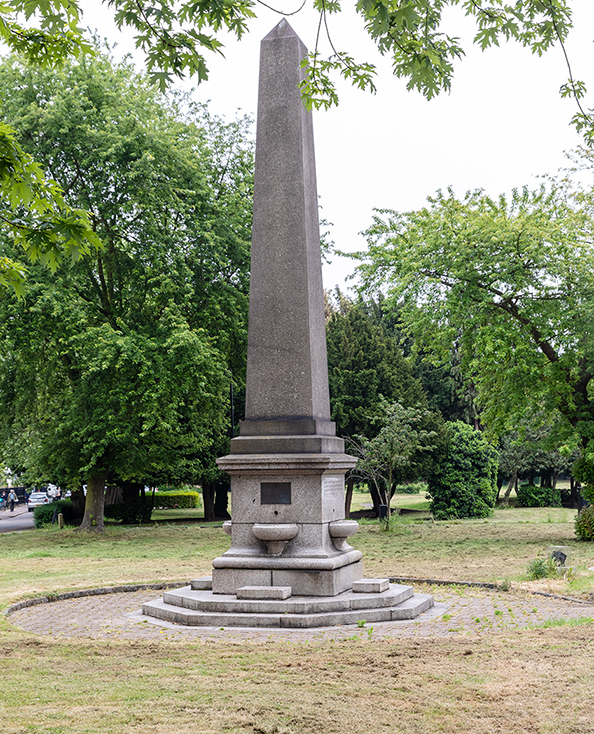
Catherine Smithies' memorial in Wood Green

Smithies died at Earlham Grove House on 25 October 1877, aged 82. On her deathbed she stated: "the teaching of children to be kind and merciful to God's lower creatures is preparing the way for the gospel of Christ." She was buried in Abney Park Cemetery in Stoke Newington; Thomas was buried alongside her after his death. A guard of honour was formed by uniformed RSPCA officers at her funeral.

After her death, Smithies was commemorated by Thomas in issue number 281 of The British Workman. Her family and friends erected an obelisk and public drinking fountain in Wood Green as a memorial.
