= Haringey Heartlands =

Urban regeneration project in London, England

Coordinates: 51°35′32.03″N 0°6′45.73″W

Haringey Heartlands is an urban regeneration project in the London Borough of Haringey, in north London, England.

== Geography ==
The site is located west of Shopping City in Wood Green. The aim of the development is "to create a vibrant and attractive new urban quarter which acts as the civic and cultural Heart of Haringey, integrating with and benefiting wider communities."

The newly named Heartlands will centre on the new Clarendon Square and spine road (named Mary Neuner Road, after the former mayor of the borough), based around Brook Road, Clarendon Road and Western Road. It will be the site for 1,300–1,500 new homes, as well as small business space, a 20-storey tower, and open spaces and play areas.

== History ==
Public consultation on the site commenced in 2003 and a draft development plan was drawn up in 2005. A £4.6m government grant to Transport for London and Haringey London Borough Council meant that civil engineering started on the spine road through the site in Spring 2008, and was completed by October 2009.
