= Braemar Avenue Baptist Church =

Church in Wood Green, London, England

Coordinates: 51.6008°N 0.1174°W

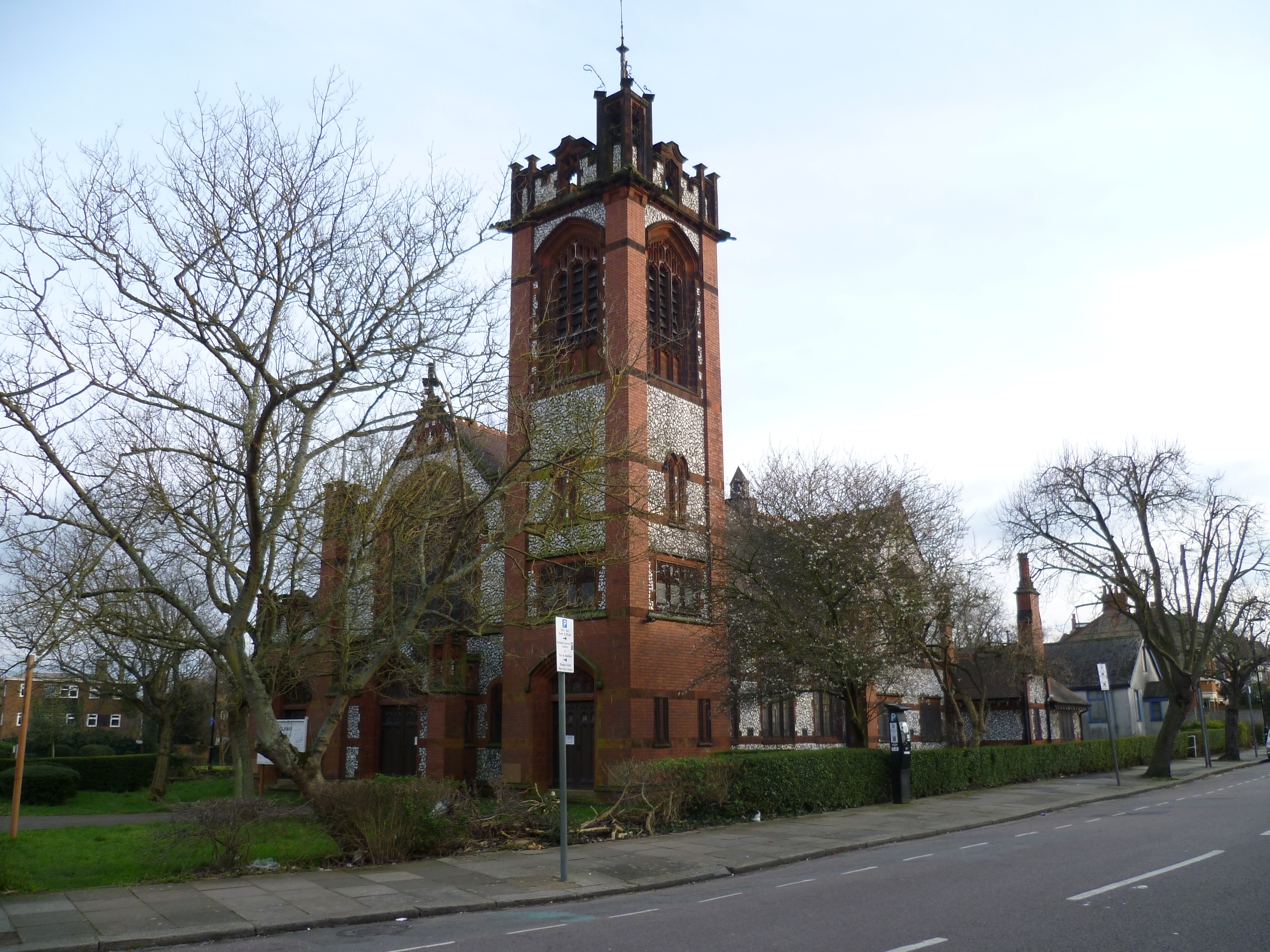
Braemar Avenue Baptist Church

The Braemar Avenue Baptist Church is a grade II listed baptist church in Braemar Avenue, Wood Green, London.
