= Haringey Civic Centre =

Municipal building in London, England

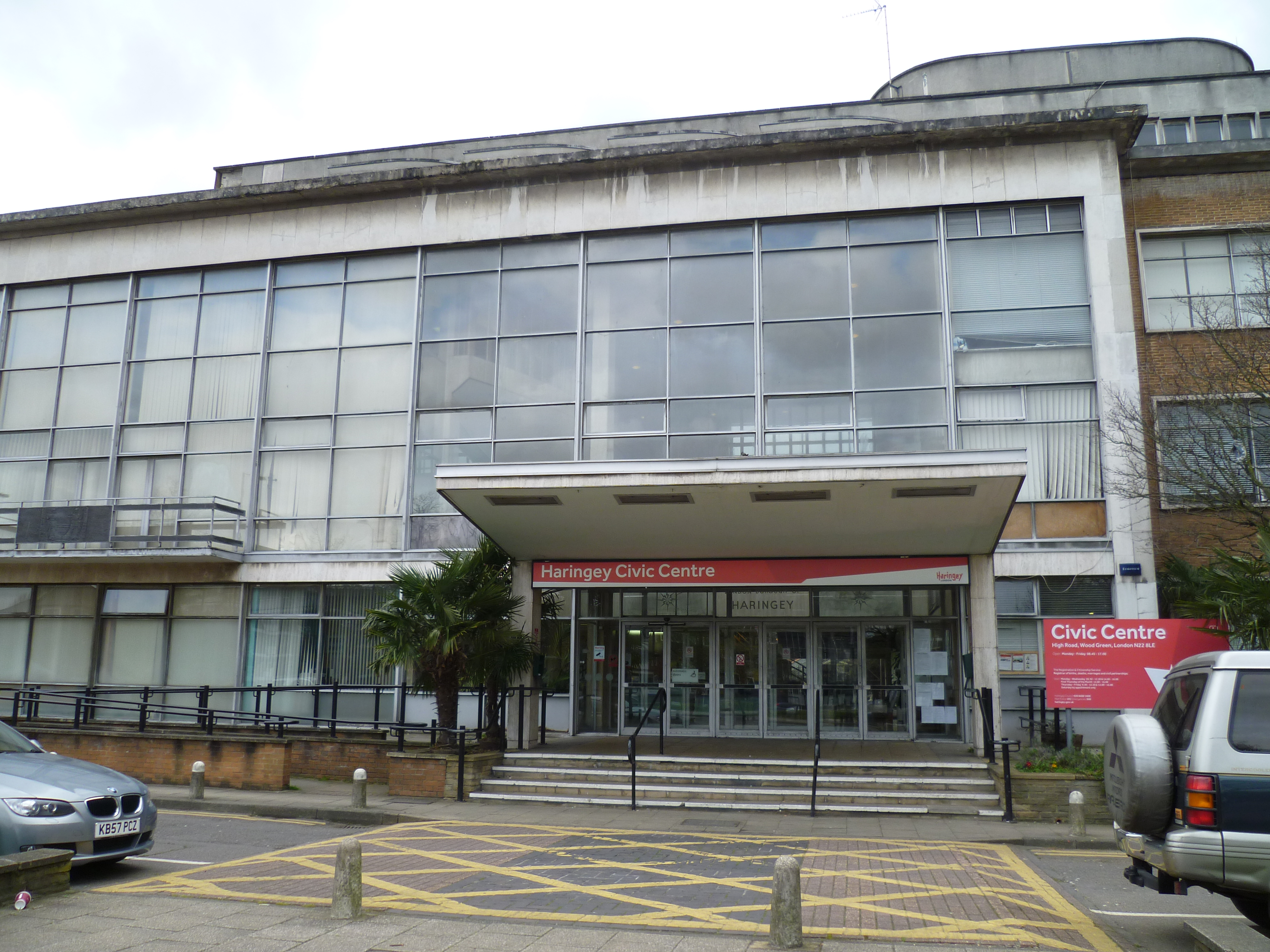
- Haringey Civic Centre

- Shown in Haringey
- 51.6002°N 0.1119°W
- Location: 255 High Road, Wood Green, London N22 8LE

History
- Built: 15 March 1958; 68 years ago

Site notes
- Architect(s): Sir John Brown, A E Henson and Partners

Listed Building – Grade II
- Designated: 26 July 2018; 8 years ago
- Reference no.: 1454719

Haringey Civic Centre is a municipal building in High Road, Wood Green, London. The town hall, which is the headquarters of Haringey London Borough Council, is a Grade II listed building.

== History ==
The building was commissioned by the Municipal Borough of Wood Green to replace the ageing Wood Green Town Hall in High Road. After the old town hall had become inadequate for the council's needs, civic leaders decided to build a new town hall: the site selected for the new building, which was further south on High Road, had previously been occupied by some 19th residential properties known as the Fishmongers' and Poulterers' Almshouses.

Construction work on the building, which was undertaken by Gee, Walker & Slater, started in 1956. The new building was designed by Sir John Brown, A E Henson and Partners and was officially opened by the local member of parliament, Joyce Butler, as Wood Green Civic Centre on 15 March 1958. The design, which was influenced by Aarhus City Hall and Søllerød Town Hall, both in Denmark, envisaged a public area in the southern part of the building and workspace for council officers and their departments in the northern part of the building. It involved an asymmetrical main frontage facing onto High Road; the southern section featured a large projecting glass frontage with a doorway on the ground floor while the northern section of the frontage comprised nine bays with windows on each of the ground, first and second floors. Internally, the principal rooms were the council chamber behind the glass frontage on the first floor and the mayor's parlour in the west wing of the building. The council chamber was designed with an unusual suspended ceiling which sloped down to the back of dais on which the mayor sat.

An underground nuclear fall-out shelter was established in the basement but a public hall, which had been intended for the site, was never built. The building continued to be the local seat of government, as Haringey Civic Centre, when the enlarged London Borough of Haringey was formed in 1965. A Citizens Advice Bureau was established in the building in 1975; although now known as Citizens Advice Haringey, it continues to operate from the centre. Many of the council officers and their departments moved to River Park House further south on High Road in 2005.

In 2017 the civic centre, much of which is now unused, was the subject of a consultation on regeneration options including possible replacement, but after English Heritage listed the building in July 2018, the regeneration options became more restricted. English Heritage praised its "Scandinavian influence, transparency and modernity."

In 2026, the council initiated a programme of works, being carried out by Sisk Group to a design by Hawkins\Brown, to refurbish the civic centre, which is due to reopen in 2027.
