= Municipal Borough of Wood Green =

Former local government area in the UK

Coordinates: 51°36′N 0°7′W

Wood Green
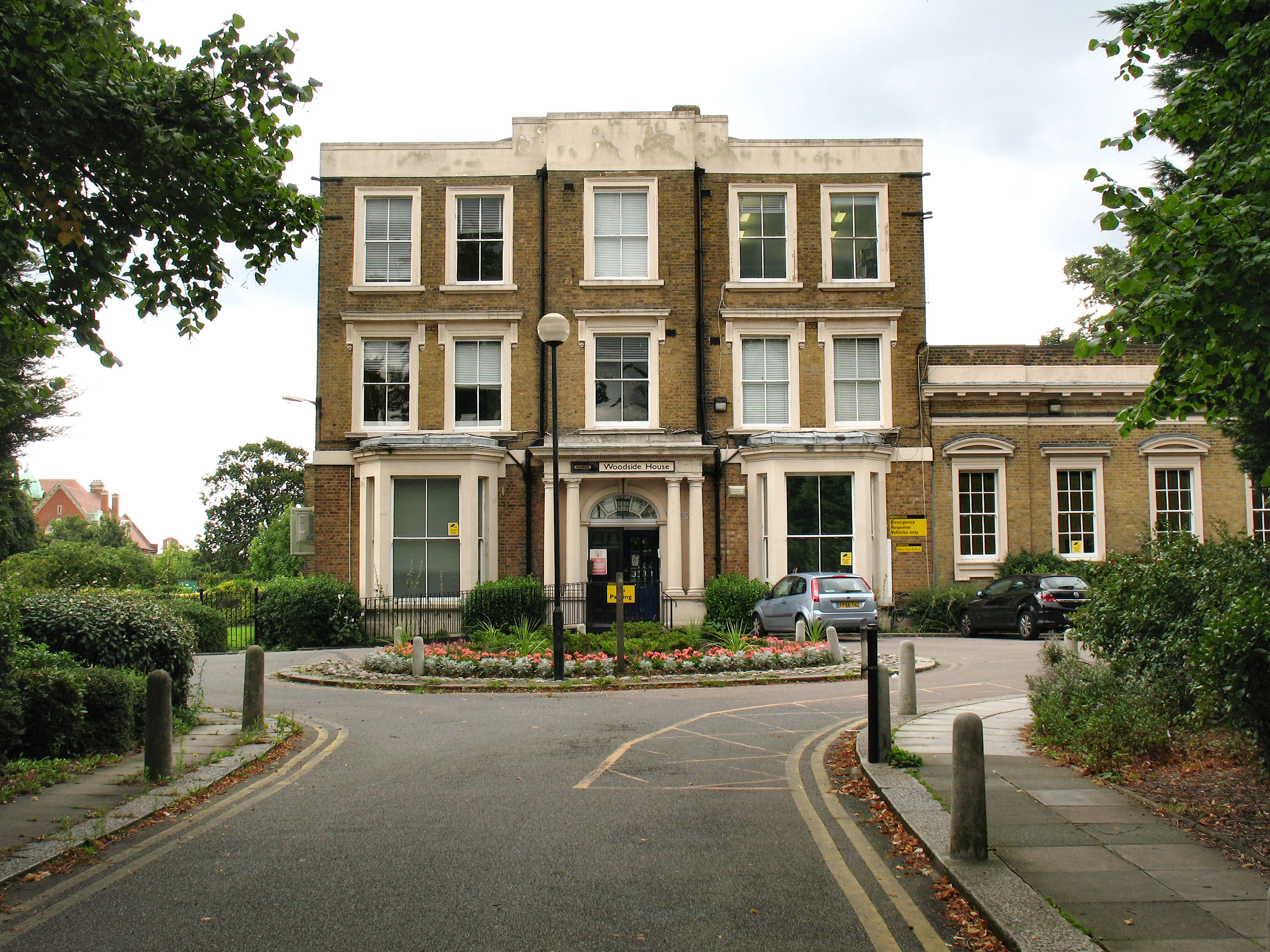
- The former Wood Green Town Hall

- Wood Green within Middlesex in 1961
- Area
  - 1901: 1,625 acres (6.6 km^{2})
  - 1965: 1,697 acres (6.9 km^{2})
- Population
  - 1901: 34,223
  - 1961: 47,945
- History
  - Created: 1888
  - Abolished: 1965
  - Succeeded by: London Borough of Haringey
- Status: Local board (1888–1894); Civil parish (1894–1965); Urban district (1894–1933); Municipal borough (1933–1965)
- Government
  - HQ: Woodside House, Wood Green
  - Motto: Nostrum Viret Robur
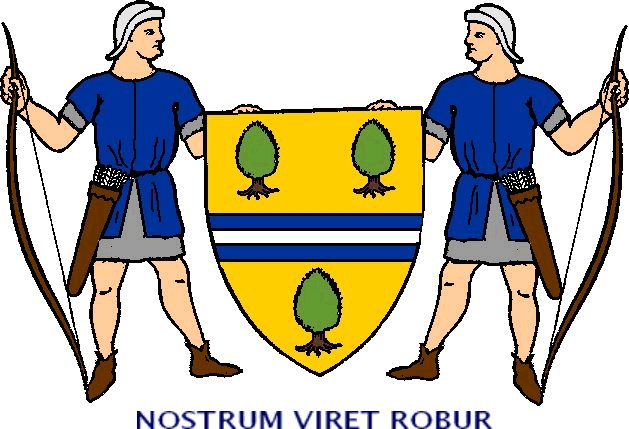
- Coat of arms of the municipal borough council

Wood Green was a local government district in south east Middlesex from 1888 to 1965.

== History ==
Until 1888, Wood Green was part of Tottenham, and was included in the district of the Tottenham Local Board in 1850. Pressure from residents of the area led to the passing of the Tottenham Local Board (Division of District) Act 1888, constituting a separate local board for the area.

In 1894, under the local Government Act of that year, Wood Green became an urban district. In 1933 it was incorporated as a municipal borough. It was part of the London postal district and Metropolitan Police District.

A coat of arms was granted to the borough on incorporation. The shield featured yew trees and was supported by medieval archers, recalling that Wood Green had once been an area where archery was practised. A silver and blue stripe across the centre of the shield depicted the New River. The Latin motto was nostrum viret robur, which could be translated as our strength is a tree or more appropriately as Wood Green Flourishes.

In 1893, Earlham Grove House (later known as Woodside House) was purchased by the Local Board to serve as a Town Hall. It accommodated the area's first public library, and in 1913 a single-storey extension was added to provide a council chamber for meetings of the Urban District Council. The building continued in use as Wood Green Town Hall until 1958.

In 1965, the municipal borough was abolished and its area was transferred to Greater London under the London Government Act 1963. Wood Green's area was combined with the Municipal Borough of Tottenham and the Municipal Borough of Hornsey to form the present-day London Borough of Haringey.
