= Thomas Bywater Smithies =

English businessperson and publisher (1817–1883)

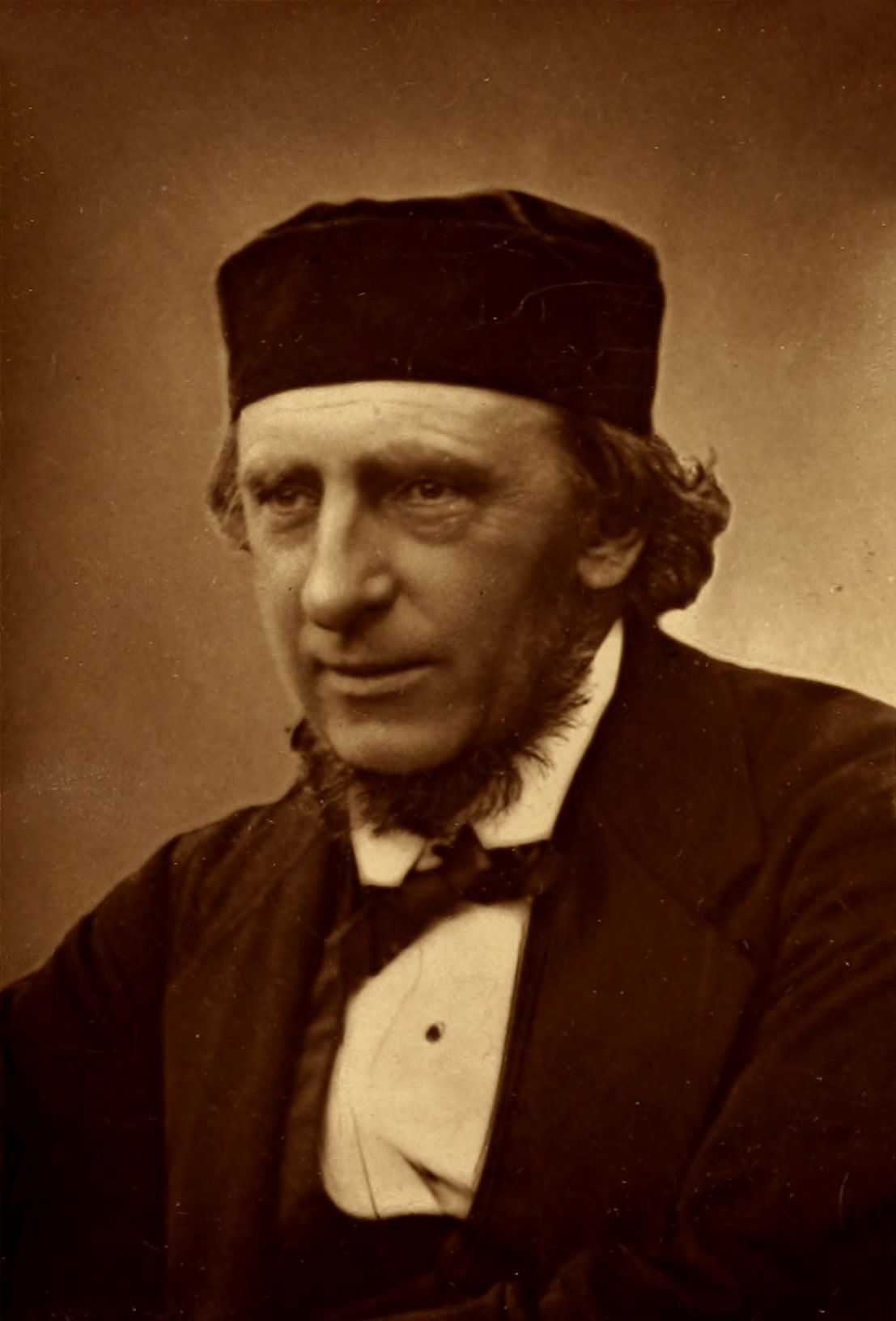
- Born: 27 August 1817; York, England
- Died: 20 July 1883 (aged 65); London, England
- Resting place: Abney Park Cemetery
- Other name: T. B. S.
- Occupations: Businessperson; publisher; editor; activist
- Known for: Campaigning for temperance and animal welfare; Founding and editing The British Workman
- Mother: Catherine Smithies

Thomas Bywater Smithies (27 August 1817 – 20 July 1883) was an English businessperson, publisher, editor, and campaigner for temperance and animal welfare. He founded and edited the broadsheet periodical The British Workman.

== Biography ==
Smithies was born on 27 August 1817 in York, the second of ten children of James Smithies and Catherine Smithies. His mother campaigned for abolitionism, animal welfare, and temperance. Smithies converted to Methodism at the age of 15 and joined the Methodist Society. The following year, he began work at the Yorkshire Fire and Life Insurance Company. He also worked as a Sunday school teacher and started missionary meetings for children. He became teetotal in 1837, aged 20. Smithies also founded the first temperance society in York.

In 1849, Smithies moved to London to become manager of the Gutta Percha Company. He formed the first Band of Hope in London at the house of his friend Hannah Bevan, with some of her neighbours and children as members. In 1851, he published Sunday Scholars' Friend and the Band of Hope Review (1851–1937). In 1855, he founded The British Workman, which he edited. His later publications included The Infant's Magazine, The Children's Friend, The Family Friend, The Friendly Visitor, and The Weekly Welcome.

In 1879, Smithies published the Band of Mercy Advocate (1879–1934), a periodical for the Bands of Mercy movement founded by his mother.

Smithies died of heart disease on 20 July 1883, aged 65, after a long illness. He was buried with his mother in Abney Park Cemetery.

== Publications ==
- Illustrated Songs and Hymns for the Little Ones (1858; under the name Uncle John)
- Illustrated Sabbath Facts; or God's Weekly Gift for the Weary. Reprinted from the "British Workman" (1869–1883)
- Gleanings for the Drawing-room, in Prose and Verse (1873)
- Illustrated Anecdotes and Pithy Pieces of Prose and Verse (1874)
- The Earlham Series of Tracts (1880)
- The "Starlight" Temperance series (1881)
