= Heartlands High School, London =

Heartlands High School

Location
- Station Road, Wood Green; London, N22 7ST; England; 51°35′45.3″N 0°7′2.8″W

Information
- Other name: HHS
- Type: Academy
- Established: 2010
- Local authority: Haringey London Borough Council
- Trust: Heartlands Community Trust
- Department for Education URN: 139616 Tables
- Ofsted: Reports
- Head teacher: Huw Levis
- Gender: Mixed
- Age range: 11–16
- Enrolment: 1,166 (as of 2024)
- Website: www.heartlands.haringey.sch.uk

Heartlands High School (HHS) is an 11–16 mixed secondary school with academy status in Wood Green, London, England. It was established in 2010 as a community school and became an academy in 2013.

The project was commissioned by Building Schools for the Future (BSF), was funded by £33 million in tax-payer's money and was constructed by Wilmott Dixon.

== Academy status ==
In 2011, discussions were instigated to convert Heartlands to an 'academy'. Opinion was mixed, but ultimately the governors' consensus fell in favour of turning the school into an academy. The change prompted governor George Meehan to step down over clashes with Garrill.
