= The British Workman =

English broadsheet periodical

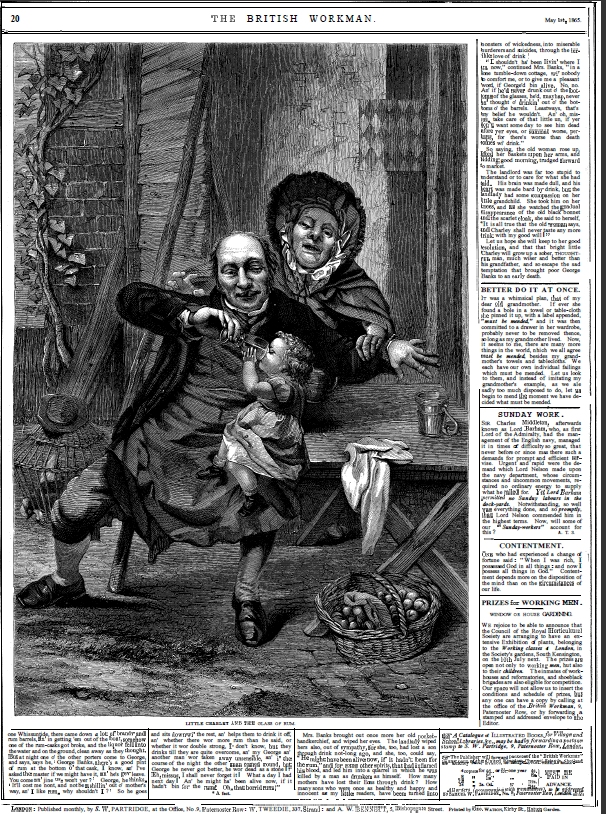
Page from the British Workman, 1865

The British Workman was an English broadsheet periodical, published monthly by Partridge and Co in London. The publishing house of S. W. Partridge & Co. was founded by Thomas Bywater Smithies of York in 1855 in order to publish The British Workman. It was published between 1855 and 1892, and aimed to "promote the health, wealth and happiness of the working classes". It was illustrated with contemporary engravings, with many numbers having the first page given over to a single engraving. The text, written by a number of authors, was a mixture of socialism and Protestantism. It was a strong advocate of temperance, and was "dedicated to the industrial classes".

Collections of the magazine are held in a number of libraries including the Bodleian Library in Oxford; and the Heatherbank Museum of Social Work, which holds an incomplete run of annual bound copies from 1855 to 1892.

Selected issues and further information on the magazine can be found on the Business, Labour, Trade and Temperance site.
