= Bands of Mercy =

Organisations for kindness to non-human animals

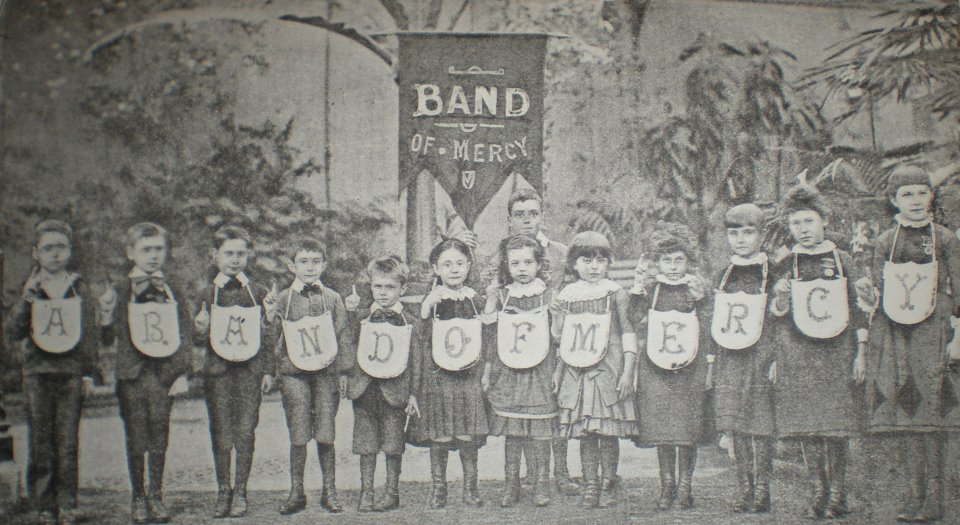
Band of Mercy c. 1890

Bands of Mercy were formal, locally led organizations in the 19th and 20th centuries that brought people—especially children and adolescents—together to learn about kindness to non-human animals. The Bands also worked to help animals and prevent cruelty in their area through humane education and direct action.

== Creation ==
Modelled after the Band of Hope of the temperance movement, the first Bands of Mercy were created in 1875, by the philanthropist Catherine Smithies in Britain. The first Band of Mercy was formed at the house of Hannah Bevan. The movement had a periodical, Band of Mercy Advocate (1879–1934), which was originally edited by Smithies' son Thomas Bywater Smithies. In 1882, the Royal Society for the Prevention of Cruelty to Animals (RSPCA) assumed responsibility for organizing and promoting the Band of Mercy and its publications.

=== Movement to Australia ===
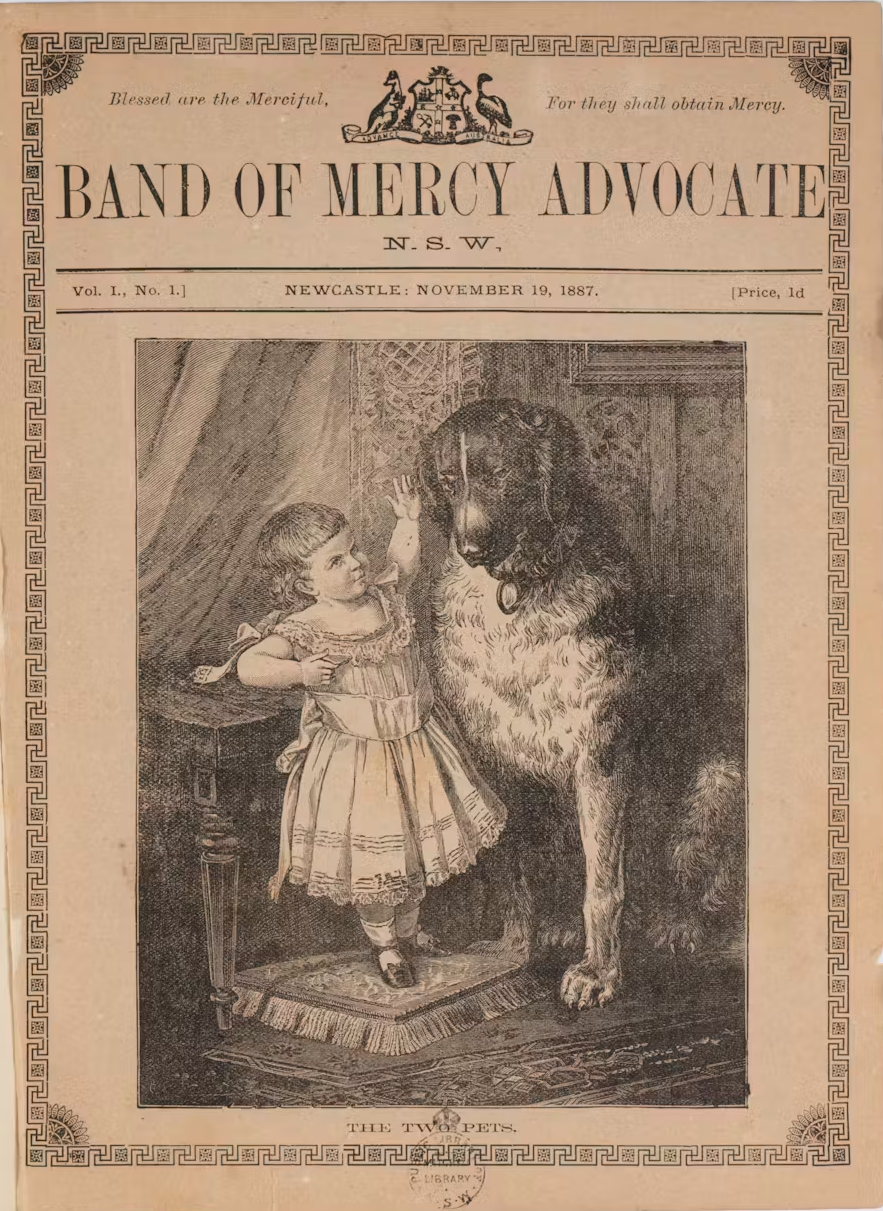
Vol 1 Issue 1 Band of Mercy Advocate NSW

The Band of Mercy movement spread to Australia, Canada and the US. The Australian first Band of Mercy was founded on 4 January 1884 by Emma and her sister Frances Deborah Levvy. Frances' efforts resulted in her reporting that were 446 similar groups by 1889. The public schools in New South Wales supported her efforts to expand even more and she was paid to create new Bands of Mercy in Schools by the Department of Public Instruction. In return for the fifty pounds she was paid she visited dozens of schools and handled a voluminous correspondence.

Levvy's relationship with the British RSPCA became difficult, but she persevered. She published the Band of Mercy and Humane Journal of New South Wales from July 1887 to 1923.

=== Movement to North America ===
Following the British model, George T. Angell, founder and first president of the Massachusetts Society for the Prevention of Cruelty to Animals (MSPCA), and the Rev. Thomas Timmins began the formation of Bands of Mercy in the United States in 1882. Many locally run Bands of Mercy were created across North America in the subsequent decades. By the early part of the 20th century, more than 260,000 children—about 3% of the children aged 5–9 years old in 1900—were active members in over 27,000 local Bands of Mercy across North America.

== Activities ==
Angell said that the goals of the Bands of Mercy were to "teach and lead every child and older person to seize every opportunity to say a kind word or do a kind act that will make some other human being or some dumb [i.e., that cannot speak] creature happier."

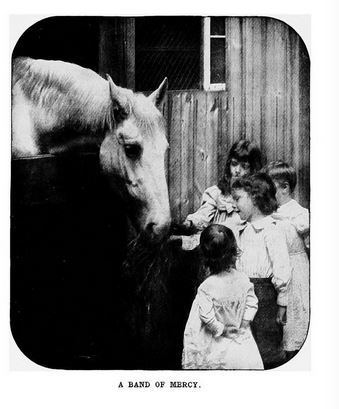
"A Band of Mercy" from Friends and Helpers by Sarah J. Eddy (1900)

Bands of Mercy were locally organized and run, even though they often used materials that were created and distributed nationally by the MSPCA and later the ASPCA. Consequently, there were many local variations to the activities of the Bands. In general, though, Bands of Mercy would hold regular meetings that began with the members pledging: "I will try to be kind to all living creatures, and try to protect them from cruel usage." Adults would often then conduct lessons to promote kindness towards and concern for all animals. These lessons often involved reading stories and singing songs and hymns. At least two song collections made these available for Band meetings: Songs of Happy Life for Schools, Homes, and Bands of Mercy (Providence RI and London, 1897) by American Sarah J. Eddy and Hymns for Children with Opening and Closing Services and Songs and Hymns for Bands of Mercy and of Hope (London, 1894), edited by Charlotte Farrington. The Band of Mercy Advocate, established by Thomas Bywater Smithies in England in 1879, printed songs in every issue. Clapp-Itnyre writes that singing filled a crucial void: "to bring language--and aesthetically pleasing language at that--to a population of animals unable to speak in their own defense." The Advocate was later retitled as merely Band of Mercy - the British Library catalogue listing The Band of Mercy Advocate from 1879 to 1882 and Band of Mercy from 1883 to 1934. In 1935 the Band was renamed the RSPCA Junior Division and the magazine retitled Animal Ways, lasting well into the second half of the century.

Membership was not limited to children and adolescents; adults would hold officer positions and would use the Bands as a forum to discuss animal cruelty issues and how to handle them. An article dated 18 July 1899 in the San Francisco Call about their local Band of Mercy, for example, mentions members reporting on the number of animal cruelty cases that had been reported in the last year (2,379) along with the resulting numbers of prosecutions (195) and convictions (129).

== Post-War decreases ==
Prior to the world wars, humane education—and the Bands of Mercy where children learned about it—was seen by many as a possible way to create a kinder and more peaceful world. The world wars dispelled much of this belief and thus the interest in Bands of Mercy. The red scare and the space race also focused much of U.S. education towards math and science, further reducing the immediate post-war interest in Bands of Mercy. In addition, the creation and maintenance of the Bands of Mercy was primarily driven by animal welfare organizations; as their attention and goals shifted away from early prevention to active intervention in abuse, much of the energy behind the Bands of Mercy dissipated.

== See also ==
- Animal rights
- Animal Liberation Front
- Animal Rights Militia
- Revolutionary Cells – Animal Liberation Brigade
