= St Michael and All Angels Church, Wood Green =

Church in Wood Green, London, England

Coordinates: 51°35′58″N 0°06′42″W

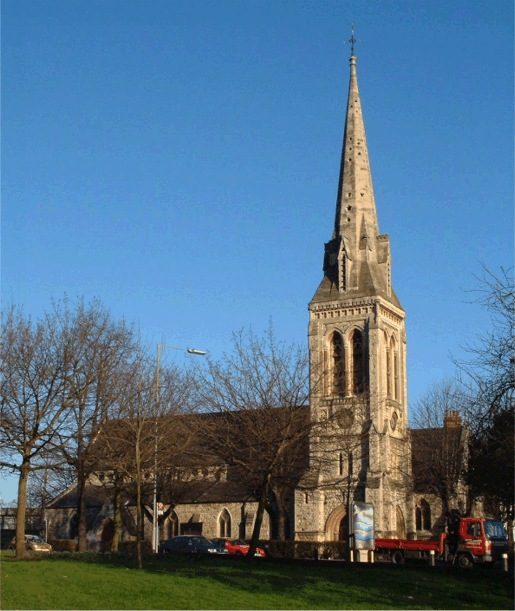
View from the south

St Michael and All Angels is a Church of England parish church that stands on Bounds Green Road in Wood Green within the London Borough of Haringey.

The first building on the site was designed by the architects George Gilbert Scott and William Bonython Moffatt and consecrated as a chapel of ease in 1844. Following a temporary closure in the 1850s due to problems of subsidence, it was altered and enlarged between 1865 and 1874. The first stage was the nave designed by Henry Curzon. A chancel was added in 1871 and a tower and spire in 1874.

The building is grade II listed.

== Bibliography ==
- Pevsner, Nikolaus (1951). Middlesex. The Buildings of England. Harmondsworth: Penguin Books. p. 175.
- Pinching, Albert (2000). Wood Green Past. London: Historical Publications. p. 58.
