= Wood Green =

Area of Haringey in London, England

Coordinates: 51.5981°N 0.1149°W

- District
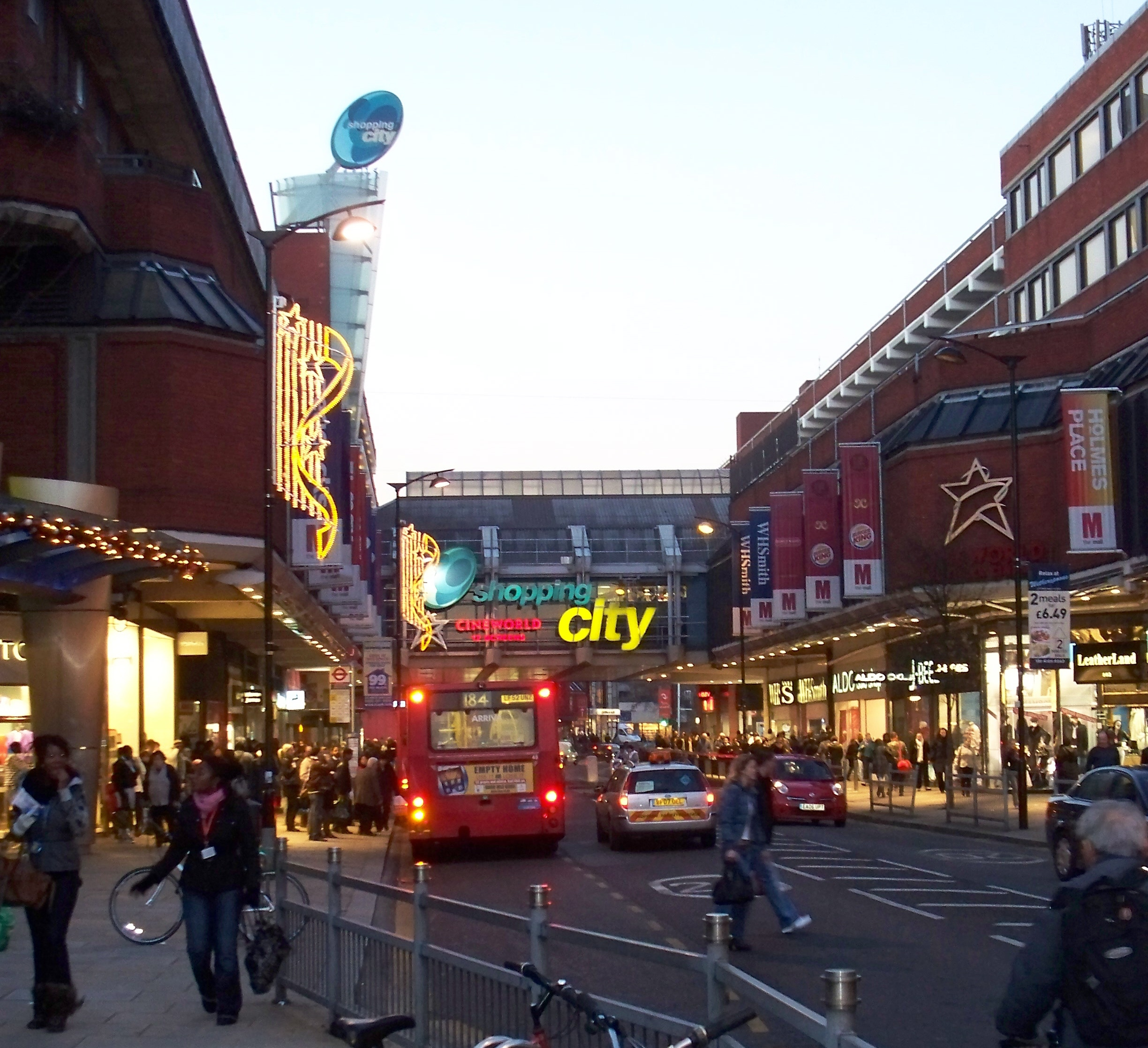
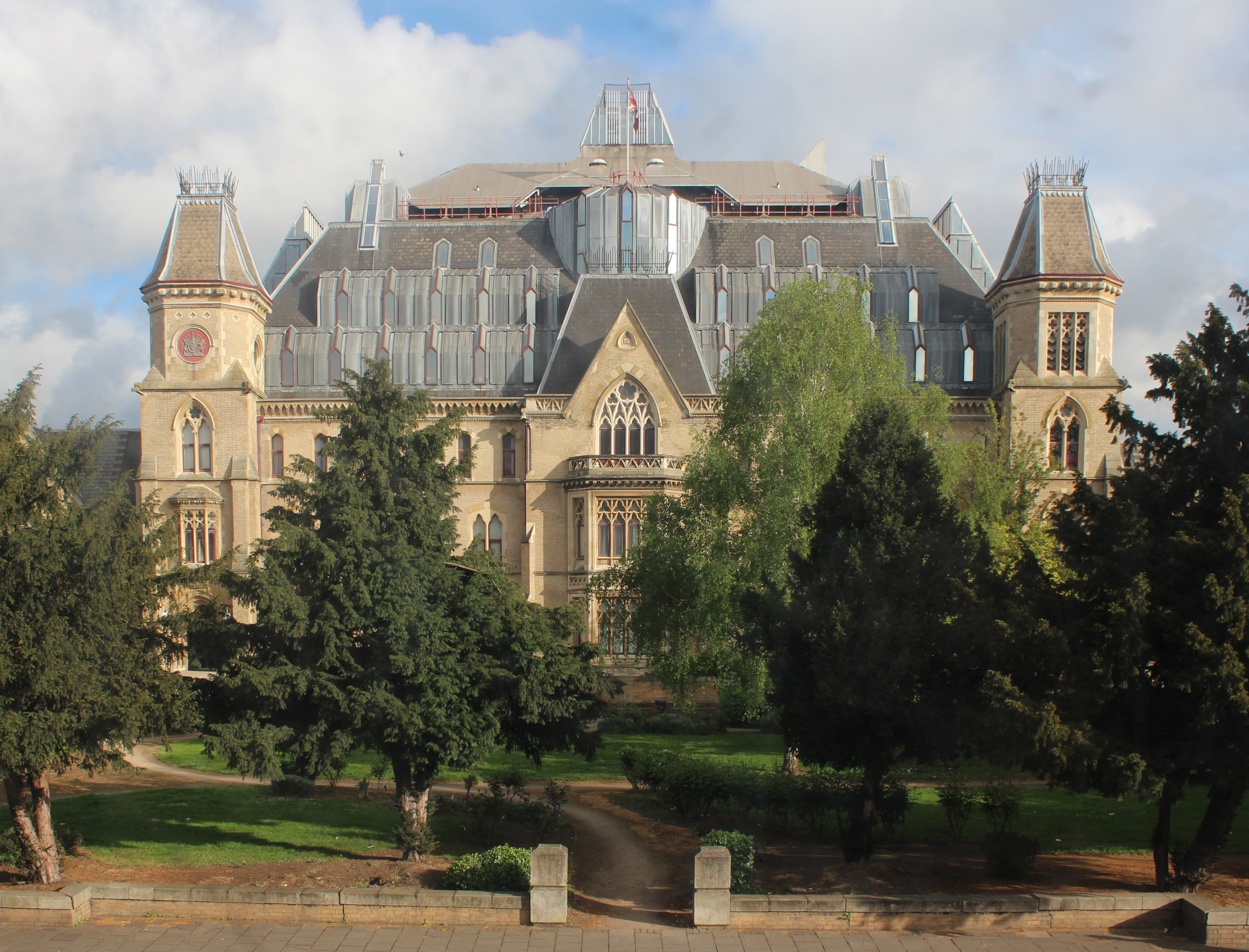
- From top to bottom: Shopping City centre; Wood Green Crown Court

- Location within Greater London
- Population: 28,453 (Noel Park and Woodside wards)
- OS grid reference: TQ305905
  - Charing Cross: 6.7 mi (10.8 km) S
- London borough: Haringey
- Ceremonial county: Greater London
- Region: London
- Country: England
- Sovereign state: United Kingdom
- Post town: LONDON
- Postcode district: N22, N8, N15
- Dialling code: 020
- Police: Metropolitan
- Fire: London
- Ambulance: London
- UK Parliament: Southgate and Wood Green
- London Assembly: Enfield and Haringey

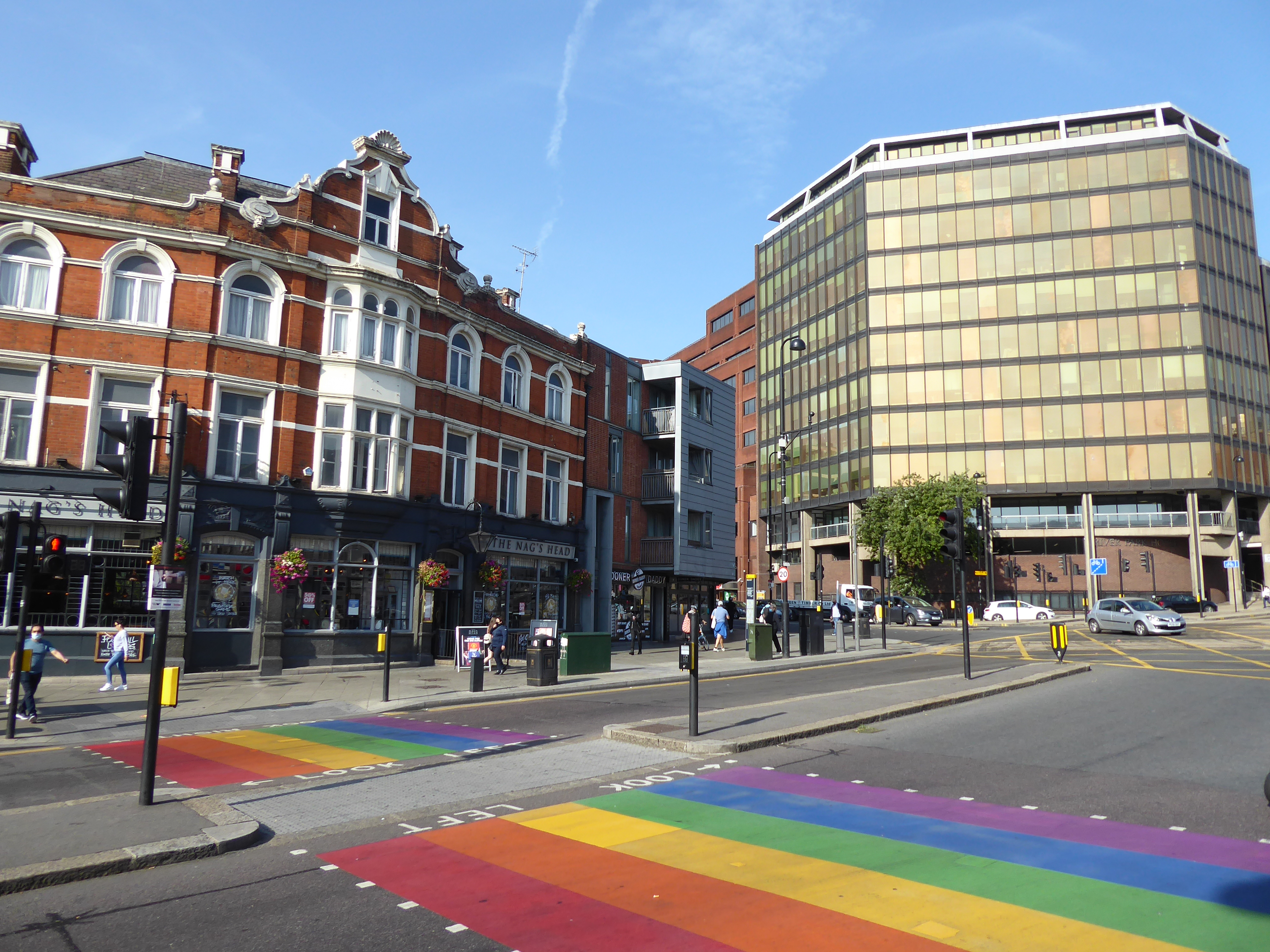
Wood Green High Street

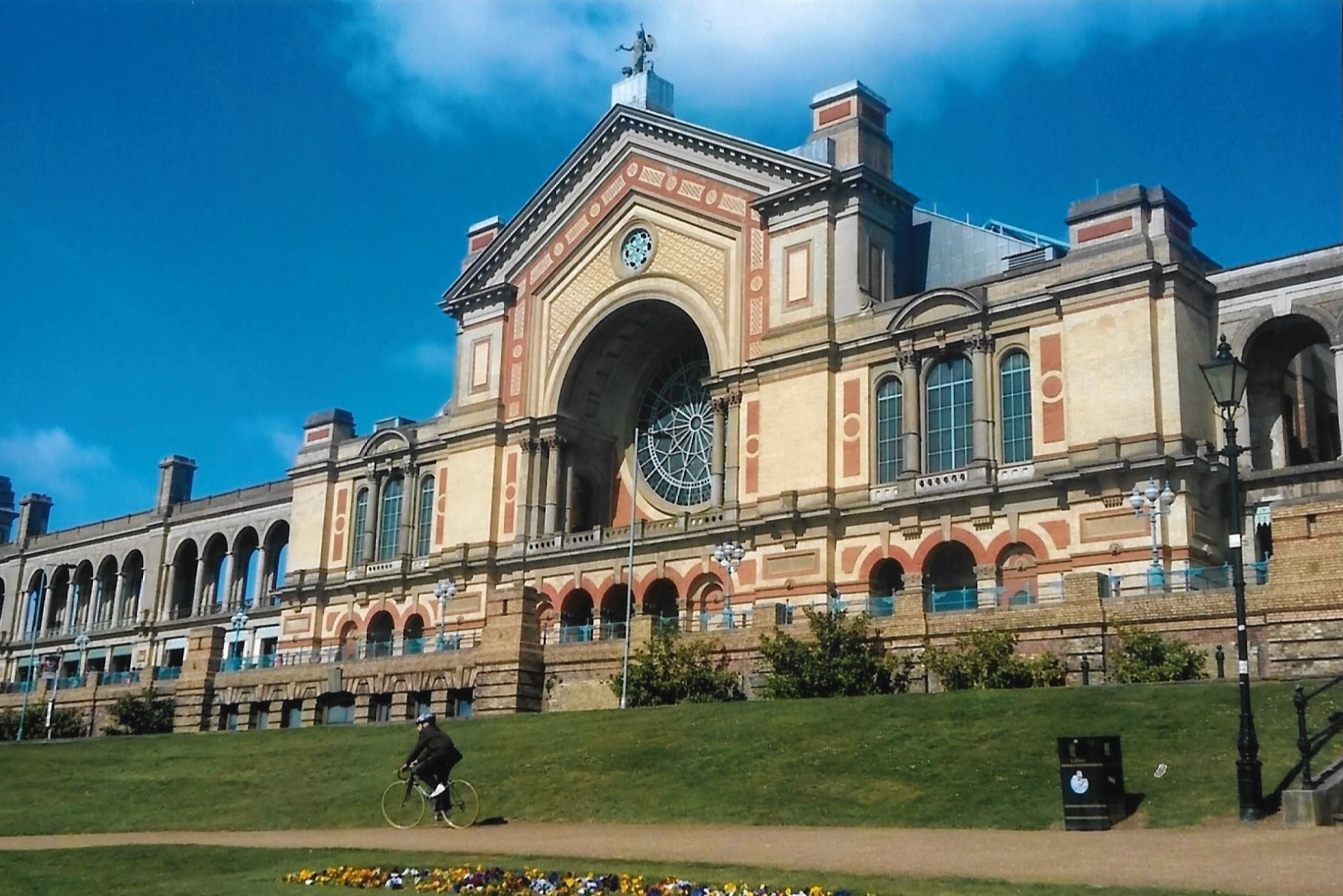
Alexandra Palace, a 25 minute walk or 11 minute bus ride from Wood Green tube station

Wood Green is a suburban district of the London Borough of Haringey, London, England. Its postal district is N22, with parts in N8 and N15. The London Plan identifies it as one of the metropolitan centres in Greater London, and today it forms a major commercial district of north London.

Formerly lying within the western part of Tottenham and the county of Middlesex, it became part of both the London Borough of Haringey and Greater London in 1965. Wood Green lies directly east of Alexandra Palace. It is 6.5 miles (10.5 km) from Charing Cross in central London.

== Toponymy ==
The name Wood Green derives from ‘Woodlegh’ or 'Woodlea', a Saxon word meaning open ground near a wood, which in this case relates to an opening in Tottenham Wood, an extensive area of woodland which formerly covered most of this area and westward to Muswell Hill. The earliest surviving written record of ‘Woodlegh’ is a reference in documentation dating from 1256, which relates to a grant for Ducketts Manor, (a sub-manor of Tottenham) which used to be located just to the east of the present-day Wood Green High Road, roughly opposite the junction of Alexandra Road and the High Road.

== History ==
Records suggest that settlement around Wood Green did not start till after the Norman Conquest. There is some limited evidence of Roman presence in the Wood Green area but none of any Saxon settlement. However, from the latter part of the 14th century, a number of estates developed around Wood Green. This included the Manor of Ducketts and a handful of smaller estates.

In the early Seventeenth Century, the lord of Tottenham Manor, the Earl of Dorset, conducted a major survey of his land. It showed that Wood Green, at the time roughly the Western half of Tottenham, had only sixteen houses and 50 inhabitants.

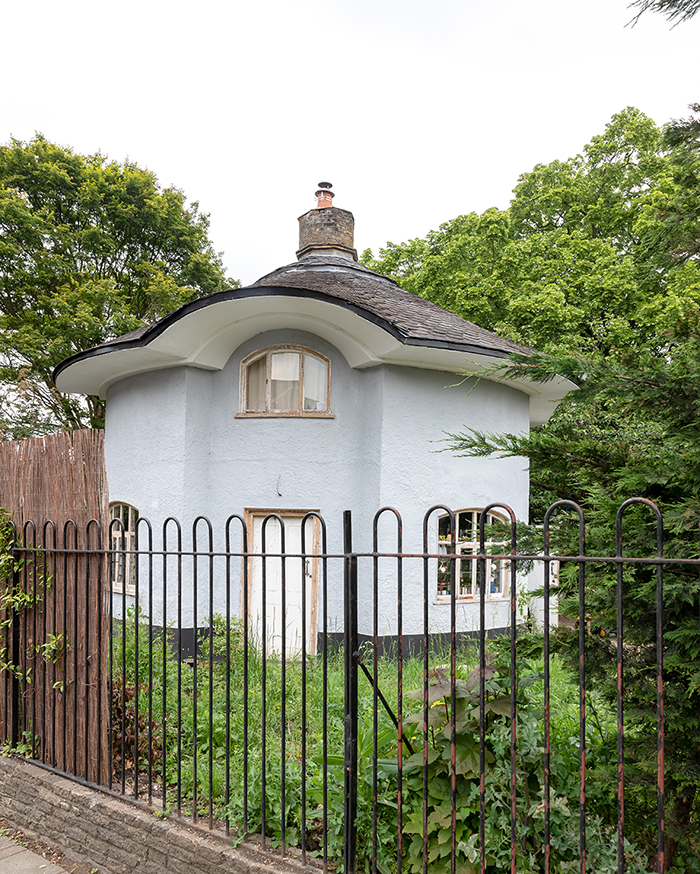
“Round House” or “Mushroom House”. Built in 1822 as the gatehouse for Chitts Hill House, this building still stands at the edge of Woodside Park in Wood Green. It is Grade II listed.

At around the same time as the Dorset Survey, the New River was constructed through Wood Green. Winding through the area, the river looped across Chitts Hill and then passed along the northern side of Wood Green Common before turning south. The proximity of Wood Green to the new watercourse enhanced the area's reputation and between the 17th and early 19th Century, several large properties were constructed in the area, initially as country retreats for wealthy Londoners. Such dwellings included Cherson House, Wood Green Cottage, Moat Cottage and the Grange, all of which were situated on the fringes of Wood Green Common and dated from the 17th Century. Later, Wood Green House (c. 1780), Chitts Hill House (c. 1805) and Bounds Green House were constructed at the perimeter of the common. Despite the development of these dwellings, by 1798 the population of Wood Green stood at just 100 inhabitants and remained scattered. It was centred at this period on Wood Green Common.

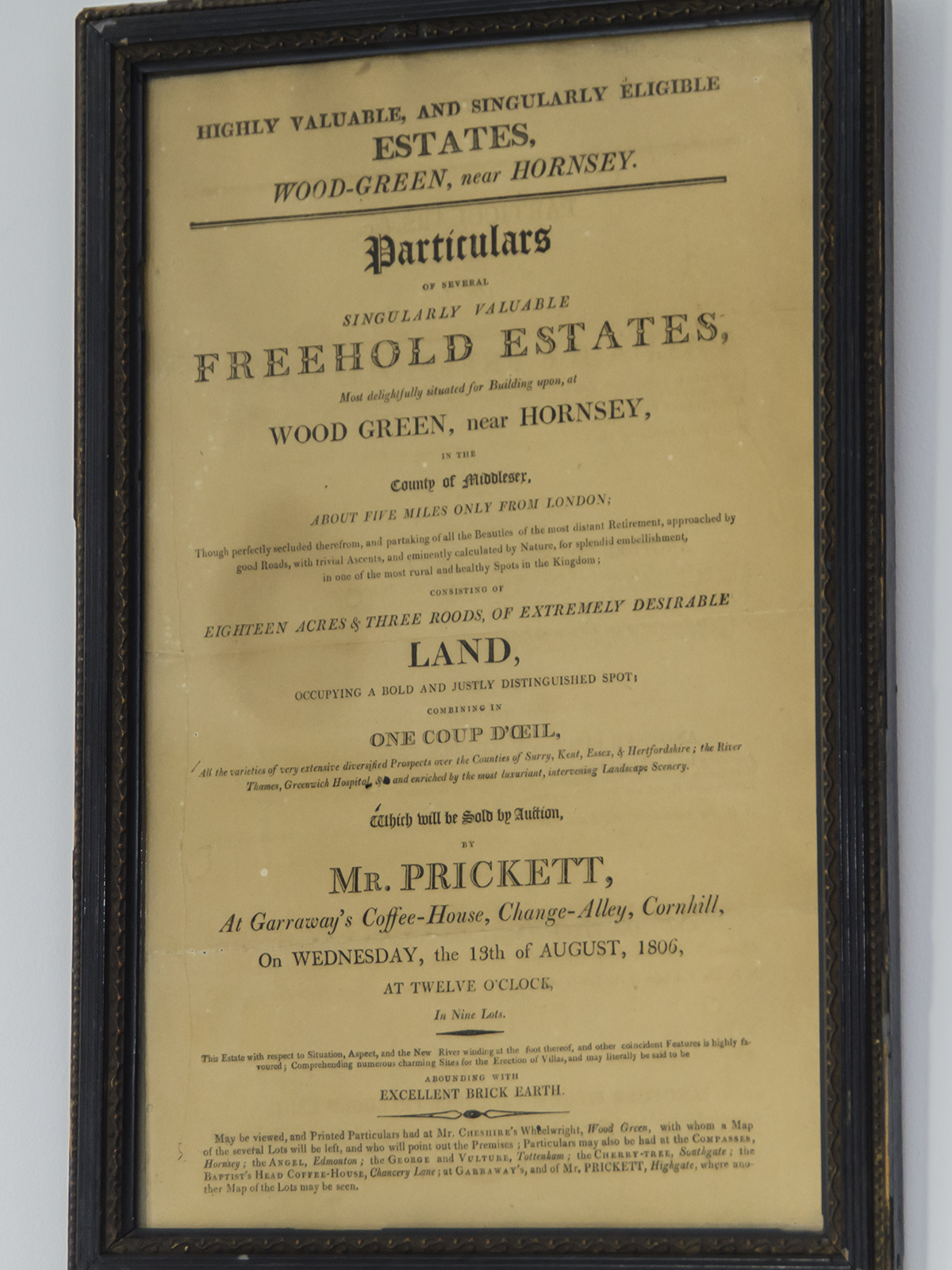
Notice for 1806 sale of land in Wood Green (Exact location unknown).

At the same time as the population was growing so was the traffic along Green Lanes. As a result, Wood Green's first inn and recognisable business appeared. In 1770 George Chesser established a blacksmith's shop on the corner of Green Lanes and Lordship Lane (later known as Spouter's Corner). In 1781, the Three Jolly Butchers coaching inn was opened on the west side of Green Lanes between Lordship Lane and Bounds Green Road.

During the early decades of the 19th Century, the number of inhabitants in the area began to increase significantly. By the middle of the nineteenth century the population had increased to 400 and the centre of Wood Green's gravity had moved north and east with most development taking place in a triangle directly north of St Michael's Church. By the time of the publication of the 1869 Ordnance Survey map, Clarence Road, Truro Road, Nightingale Road, Finsbury Road and Commerce Road were all laid out and were becoming increasingly built up.

The opening of the Great Northern Railway Line station at Wood Green in 1859 encouraged further development. By the end of the nineteenth century, much of Wood Green had been built up. What remained was built over during the first part of the twentieth century.

The Victorian development was both residential and commercial in nature. Wood Green's industrial development was centred on the area bounded by Wood Green Common, the Great Northern Railway, Turnpike Lane and the High Street. Amongst the first companies to arrive in the early 1860s was E Welch & Co Tobacco Manufacturer. Then in short order came the Hornsey Steam Laundry, Henry A. Ivory & Co Piano Manufacturers and Davis and Timmins Screw Factory. In 1880, Barratts arrived and grew to be one of the biggest confectionery manufacturers of the twentieth century.

As Wood Green's population grew, so did its high street. The earliest retail developments had been in Commercial Road and Finsbury Road during the 1860s. However, by the early 1880s retail activity was clearly shifting to the High Road. At first, it focussed on the area between White Hart Lane and Truro Road. As the population grew, retail growth south of Lordship Lane began to exceed that north of it and by the end of the first decade of the twentieth Wood Green, High Street had become a popular shopping centre for North London. By 1976 Wood Green was the largest shopping centre in north London with a turnover of more than £20m.

With the reorganisation of local government in the 1960s, Haringey Council was formed from the former boroughs of Wood Green, Hornsey and Tottenham. The new unified administration wanted to reinvent Wood Green as a ‘Heart for Haringey’. It was one of a number of new suburban centres intended to counteract the pull of Central London. The Shopping City was constructed between 1976 and 1981.

=== Governance history ===
Up to the nineteenth century, Wood Green came under the governance of the Manor and Parish of Tottenham. Tottenham developed from a parish in Middlesex into an Urban sanitary district in 1875, after a local board of health had been established in 1850.

In 1888, the Municipal Borough of Wood Green was created as an urban district, and later a municipal borough, of Middlesex. In 1965, under the London Government Act 1963, the Municipal Borough of Wood Green was abolished and its area merged with that of the Municipal Borough of Tottenham and the Municipal Borough of Hornsey to form the present-day London Borough of Haringey.

The constituency of Wood Green was created in 1918 and existed until 1983 when it was split. Some of the constituency was transferred to the neighbouring seat of Tottenham, but most was merged with the Hornsey parliamentary constituency to form the Hornsey and Wood Green parliamentary constituency. Since 2015, the seat has been represented in the House of Commons by the Labour Party Member of Parliament (MP) Catherine West.

=== Post-war ===
In mid century, Wood Green was known locally as the "Golden Mile of North London". Some shops and buildings were demolished in the 1960s and buildings were cleared to construct Shopping City, now known as The Mall Wood Green, which is one of London's major shopping centres.

==== Entertainment history ====
The Alexandra Palace, which is within Wood Green parish, played a leading role in the development of public service television. It is now an events and entertainment venue hosting exhibitions, concerts and sporting events.

Wood Green also played its part in the history of commercial television in the UK. In 1955, with the opening of Lew Grade's London weekend franchise Associated Television (ATV), the Wood Green Empire in Lymington Avenue was home to variety programmes on Independent Television (ITV); one of which was The Arthur Haynes Show, starring the host himself and his straight man Nicholas Parsons. Only the frontage of The Wood Green Empire survives. It is now a branch of the Halifax.

The now-demolished bus depot at Wood Green was used for location filming by London Weekend Television for their 1970s situation comedy On The Buses.

In the 1940s and 1950s the Fishmongers Arms pub in Wood Green was a popular jazz venue, and in the 1960s it became a rock music venue, hosting early performances by musicians and bands including John Mayall's Blues Breakers, Cream, Zoot Money, Graham Bond, Brian Auger, Julie Driscoll, Long John Baldry, Joe Cocker, Rod Stewart, Fleetwood Mac, Ten Years After, The Groundhogs, The Kinks, Led Zeppelin, Jethro Tull, and Pink Floyd.

=== 21st century ===
As of 2018, Wood Green is the focus of two major regeneration programmes by the London Borough of Haringey. The Haringey Heartlands initiative covers an area to the west of the town centre, including the former Clarendon Gas Works, Olympia Trading Estate and land on Western Road. The programme aims to transform the area into a mixed sub-neighbourhood, with 1,700 homes, along with retail and office space. There are also plans for new public open space including a 'civic boulevard' linking the east and west of Wood Green and a public square for events and activities.

The wider area of Wood Green is the focus of a second significant regeneration plan entering the final stages of consultation in early 2018. The Wood Green Area Action plan would see the transformation of Wood Green Town Centre with the creation of 6,400 new homes, 4,000 new jobs and a redeveloped town centre with a significant amount of high-rise building.

Blue House Yard is a redevelopment of a former car park including creative work and retail space, a public square for markets and events.

Wood Green is also one of the suggested stations on the new Crossrail 2 transport development.

== Geography ==
Wood Green stretches from Turnpike Lane in the south to the borough boundary in the north. Its eastern and western boundaries have changed over time and today people have varying senses of what exactly is included in Wood Green. One definition sees the western boundary as formed by the Great Northern Railway Line. Others argue that Alexandra Park is still within Wood Green's boundaries. Less contentious is the eastern boundary. A common definition would roughly describe it by a line running from the southwestern corner of Tottenhall Park, to the junction of The Roundway and Lordship Lane, then along Downhills Way as far as Belmont Avenue. This part of the boundary is completed by a line running in a northwesterly direction as far as Westbury Avenue.

The area rises from 66 ft (20 m) to 98 ft (30 m) above sea level.

== Locale ==
The shopping area and residential areas of Wood Green all offer quite different identities. The area to the west of the High Road, near Alexandra Palace, was developed as a mainly middle-class residential area, whereas the area to the east, towards Tottenham, mainly comprises smaller dwellings that were either built for railway workers in the 19th century or as social housing in the 20th. The High Road and the shopping mall host a variety of shops. There are regeneration plans approved for the old Marks and Spencer, and BHS buildings. There are a number of new restaurants which have opened along the High Road in recent years. Behind the High Road, Wood Green's streets include a high proportion of attractive high-quality Victorian houses. To the north and west of the tube station, a large number of green spaces weave through the streets and a number of larger open green areas remain.

Haringey Civic Centre on Wood Green High Road is the official seat of the London Borough of Haringey and contains the council chambers. It was opened in 1958 and is a listed building.

== Demography ==
Wood Green does not fit neatly into wards. However, a significant part of the area is contained within the Noel Park and Woodside wards. The population of those wards is given as 28,453 in the 2011 Census. The same census reports that white groups make up 55% of the population of Noel Park ward. The figures for the Woodside ward are 30% White Other, 23% White British, 14% Asian, 8% Black African, 6% Black Caribbean, 3% Black Other, 3% White Irish, 1% Arab and other ethnic groups.

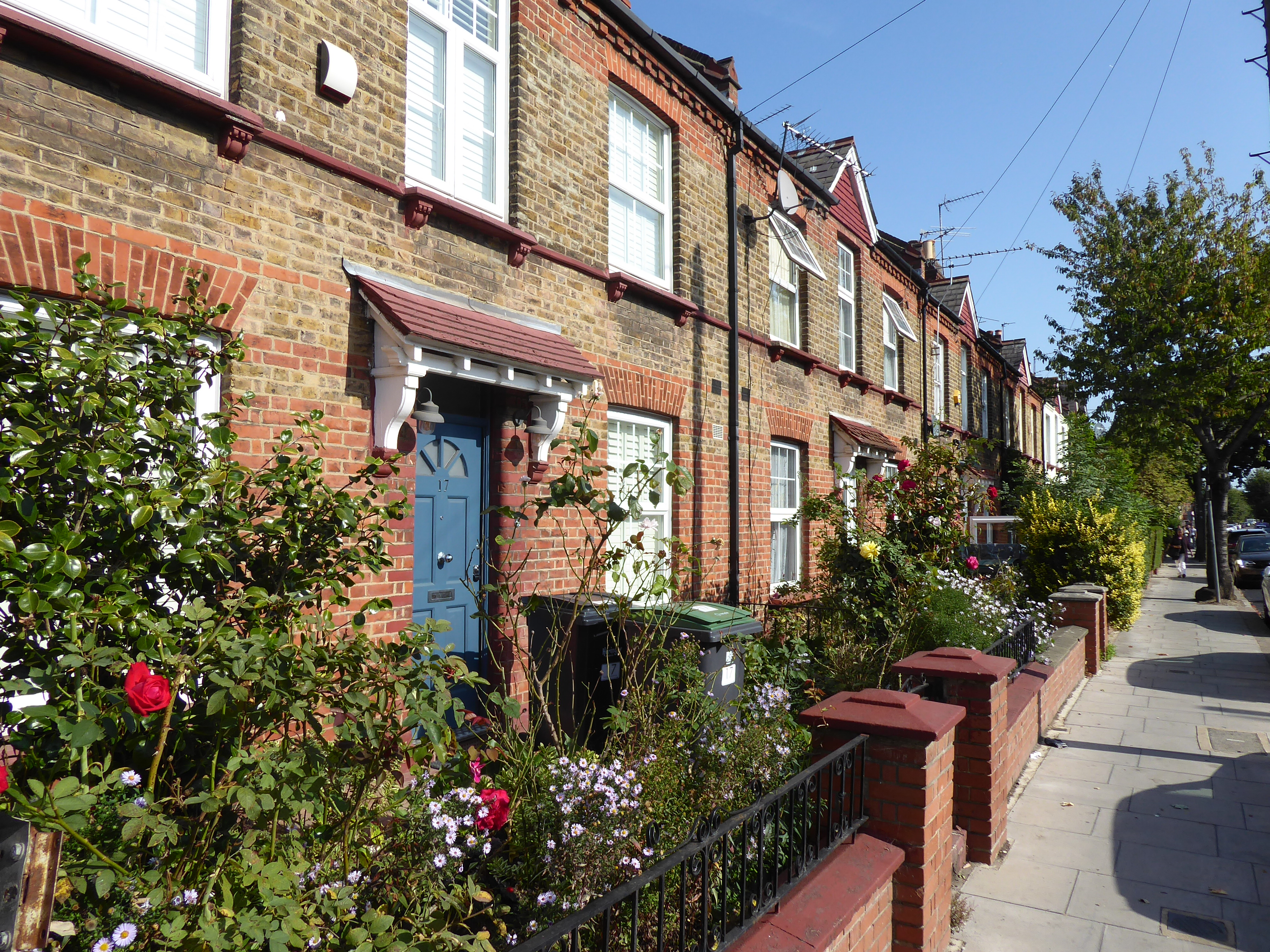
Houses at Wood Green

== Economy ==
Wood Green is a busy urban activity centre with a sizeable shopping area with two cinemas, bars, nightclubs, numerous restaurants and cafes and a shopping area, The Mall, close to the tube station. The High Road, the main shopping spine, stretches from the Wood Green tube station to the next stop on the Piccadilly line, Turnpike Lane, and is lined with shops along its route. It joins with Green Lanes at both its northern and southern ends.

As of 2012, Wood Green has 120,757 square metres (1,299,820 sq ft) of total town centre floorspace.

The Chocolate Factory was set up by Haringey Arts Council in 1996 to develop artists' studios and now has a second building. The project houses 200 local artists, music, film and multimedia studios, photographic studios, and several performing arts organisations.

== Green Spaces ==
- Alexandra Park
- Avenue Gardens (Station Road/Park Avenue)
- Barratt Gardens (Station Road/Mayes Road)
- Caxton Gardens (Station Road/Mayes Road)
- Chapmans Green (Lordship Lane/Perth Road)
- Cranbrook Park (Cranbrook Park/St Alban's Crescent)
- Crescent Gardens (High Road/Stuart Crescent)
- Finsbury Gardens (Finsbury Road)
- King George VI Memorial Garden (High Road/Stuart Crescent)
- Nightingale Gardens (Bounds Green Road)
- Riversdale Gardens (White Hart Lane/Newnham Road)
- Russell Park (Russell Avenue)
- Trinity Gardens (Bounds Green Road)
- White Hart Lane Recreation Ground (White Hart Lane)
- Wood Green Common (Station Road)
- Woodside Park (High Road)

== Transport ==
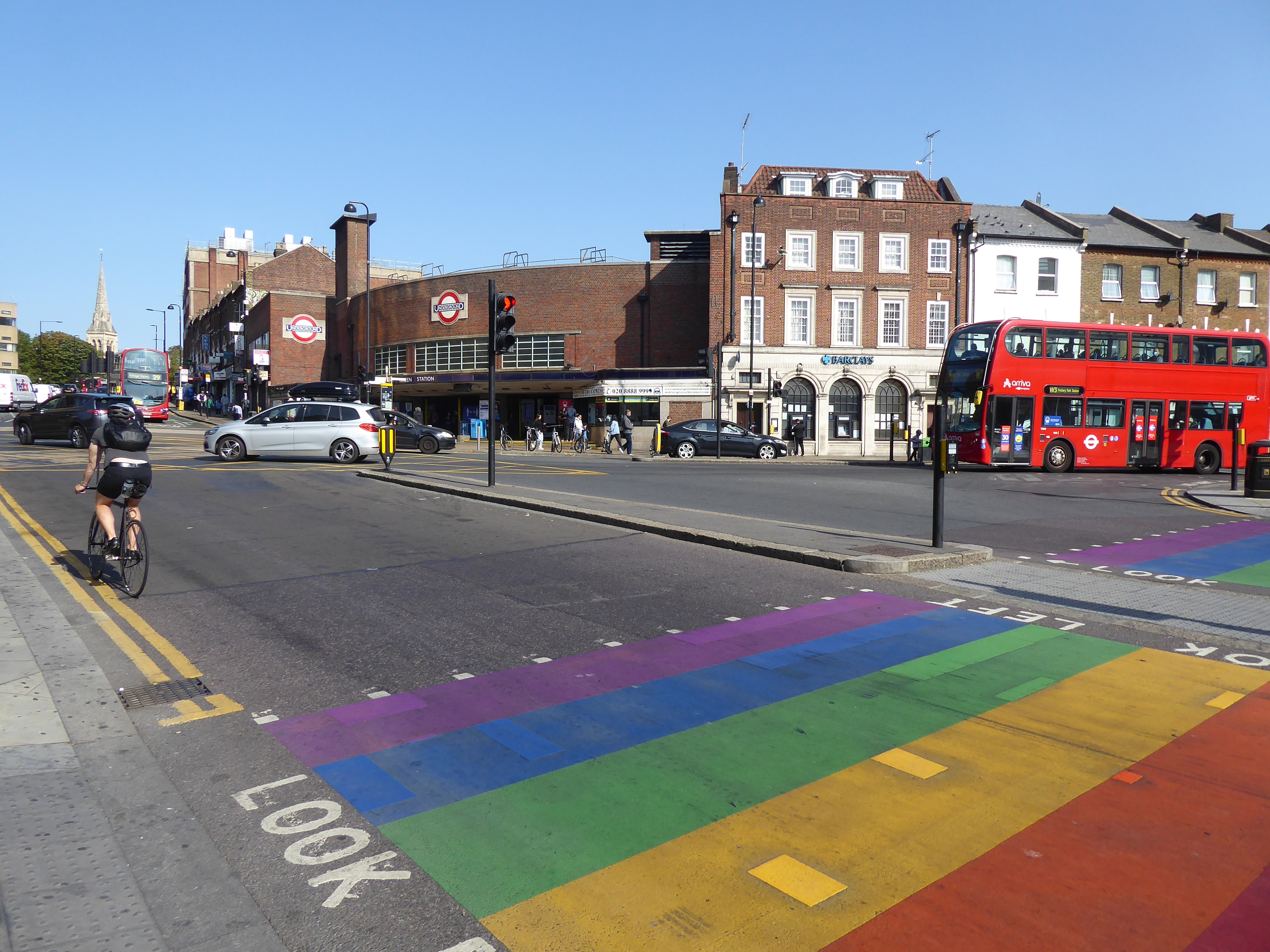
Wood Green tube station

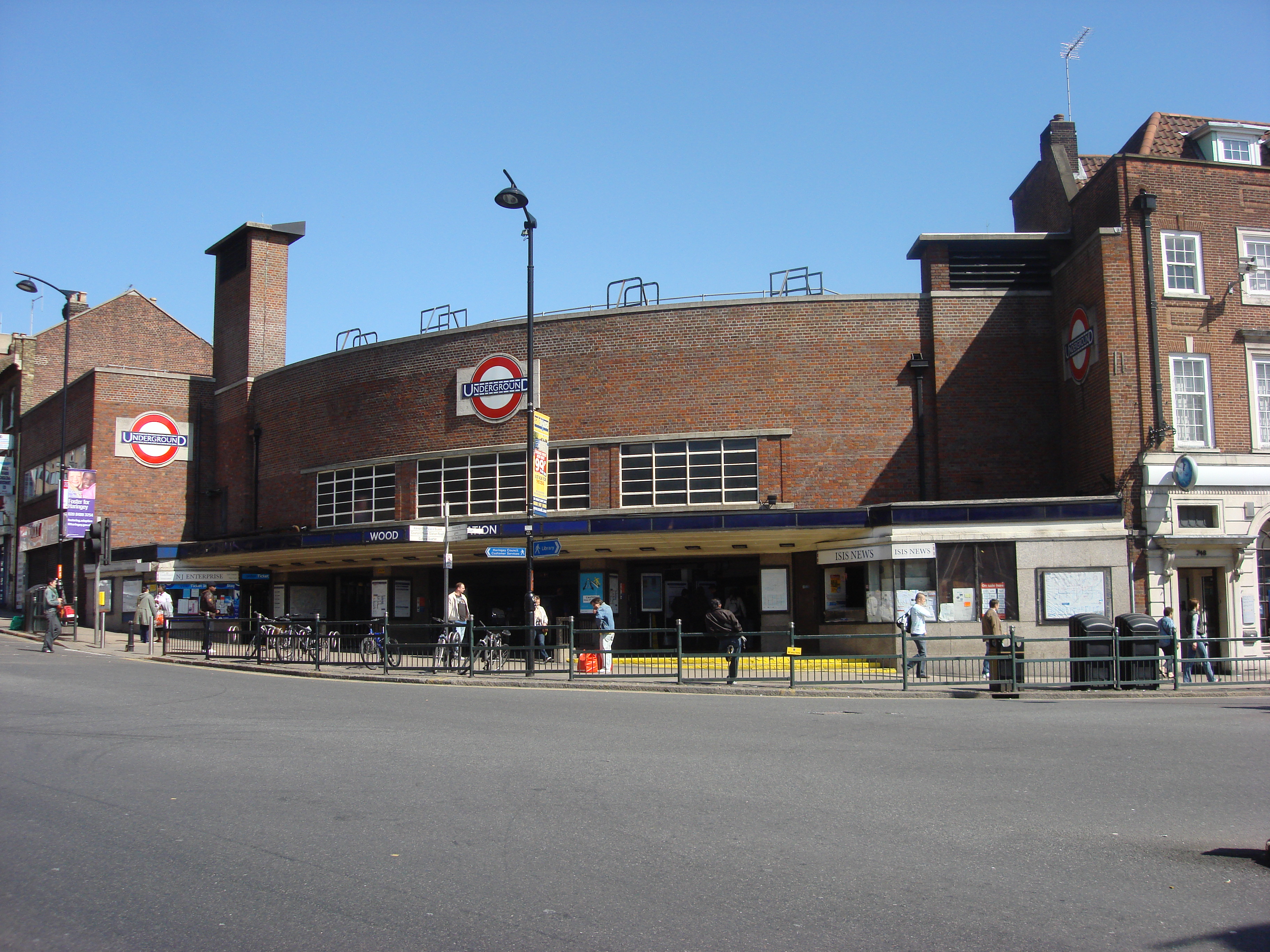
Wood Green tube station

=== London Underground ===
Wood Green tube station is at the northern end of Wood Green High Road and Turnpike Lane tube station at its southern. Both are on the Piccadilly line.

=== Railway ===
Alexandra Palace (named Wood Green until 1982) is on the East Coast Main Line. It has services in to Kings Cross and Moorgate and out to Hertford and Welwyn Garden City. Bowes Park serves the Hertford Loop Line branch of the East Coast Main Line.

=== Buses ===
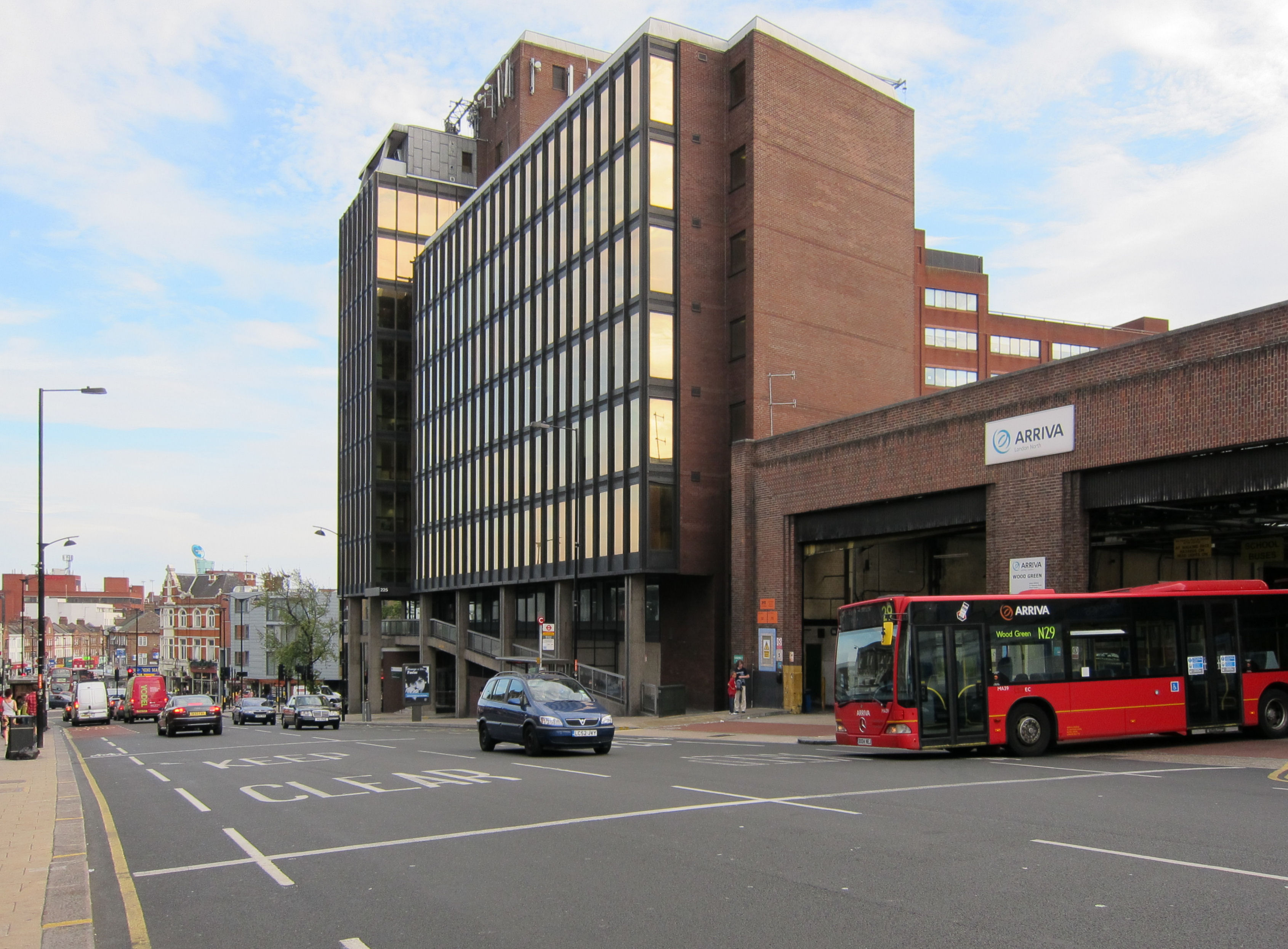
Wood Green Bus Garage

London Buses routes 29, 67, 91, 121, 141, 144, 184, 221, 230, 232, 243 (24-hour operation), 329, N29, N91, W3 and W4 serve the area.

== Public services ==
Wood Green Crown Court is on Lordship Lane.

== Education ==
Schools include:

=== Primary ===
- Belmont Primary
- Noel Park Primary
- Alexandra Primary
- Earlham Primary
- Lordship Lane Primary
- Nightingale Primary
- St Michael's C of E Primary
- St Paul's RC Primary
- Rhodes Avenue
- Trinity Primary Academy

=== Secondary ===
- Heartlands High School
- Alexandra Park School
- St Thomas More Catholic School
- Woodside High School
- Greig City Academy

=== Drama ===
- Mountview Academy of Theatre Arts (formerly)

== Places of Worship ==
St Michael's Church of England Church was built in 1844 and became an independent parish in 1866.

St Paul's Roman Catholic Church was first founded in Station Road in 1882, and was rebuilt in 1971.

St Mary's Greek Orthodox Church, Wood Green also known as The Greek Orthodox Cathedral of the Dormition of the Mother of God.

Wood Green Fatih Mosque is on Caxton Road, sharing premises with Haringey Council of Asian People.

== Sport ==
There are a number of sports facilities in the local area. Indoor and outdoor tennis, all-weather football, an athletics track and gym are available at New River Stadium. The local parks offer a variety of options for running and other sports, and many also have tennis courts. There are various gyms in the Wood Green area.

London Skolars is a semi-professional rugby league team that compete in the Kingstone Press League 1 based at New River Stadium in Wood Green. They annually hold the Middlesex 9s rugby league tournament which also takes place at the New River Stadium.

== Notable events ==
- On-stage death of Chung Ling Soo: On 23rd March 1918, magician Chung Ling Soo (the stage personality of illusionist William Ellsworth Robinson) was accidentally killed while performing his bullet-catching illusion at the Wood Green Empire; he died the next day. Twenty-one years later, fellow magician Horace Goldin also performed a bullet-catching illusion at the Empire and died in his sleep later that night.
- IRA bombing: On 10th December 1992, two IRA bombs exploded in bins outside shops at Wood Green Shopping City, injuring eleven people.
- Ricin raid incident: On 5th January 2003, police raided a flat above a pharmacy at 352 High Road, arresting six men in what later became known as the Wood Green ricin plot. Initial reports claimed that ricin had been discovered at the property, though it was subsequently established that no ricin had been found.
- Death of Joyce Vincent: In January 2006, the remains of 38-year old Joyce Carol Vincent were discovered in her flat in Wood Green, where she had lain undiscovered for three years. Her TV set was still running and unopened Christmas presents were found nearby. Her life and death later became the subject of Carol Morley's film Dreams of a Life.
- London riots: Rioting and looting took place in Wood Green during the 2011 England riots. The unrest began in nearby Tottenham following a peaceful protest over the police shooting of Mark Duggan, a 29-year-old man, in August 2011. It spread to Wood Green in the early hours of 7th August and to other parts of London and England during the same month.

== Notable appearances ==
- Nick Hornby's book, High Fidelity
- Razorlight' s song "Los Angeles Waltz"
- Mark Knopfler's song "Junkie Doll"
- Pablo Gad's song "Black Before Creation"
- Sway DaSafo's song "Up Your Speed"
- Juan Maria Solare's composition "Woodgreen Walk" for Horn and Cello, 2011
- Chris Barber jazz night at the Fisherman's Arms, captured in the film Mamma Don't Allow (1956)

== Gallery ==
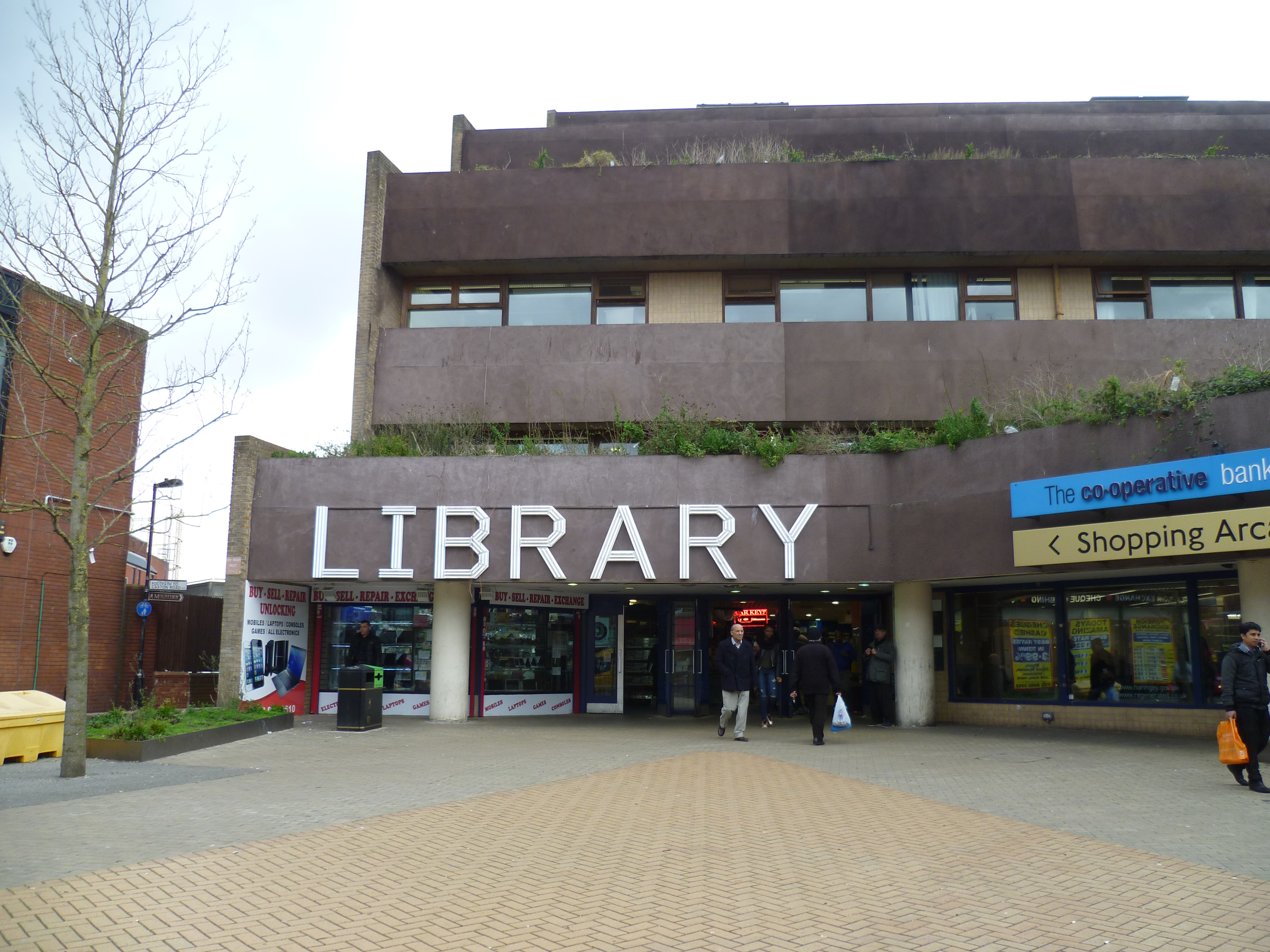
Wood Green public library

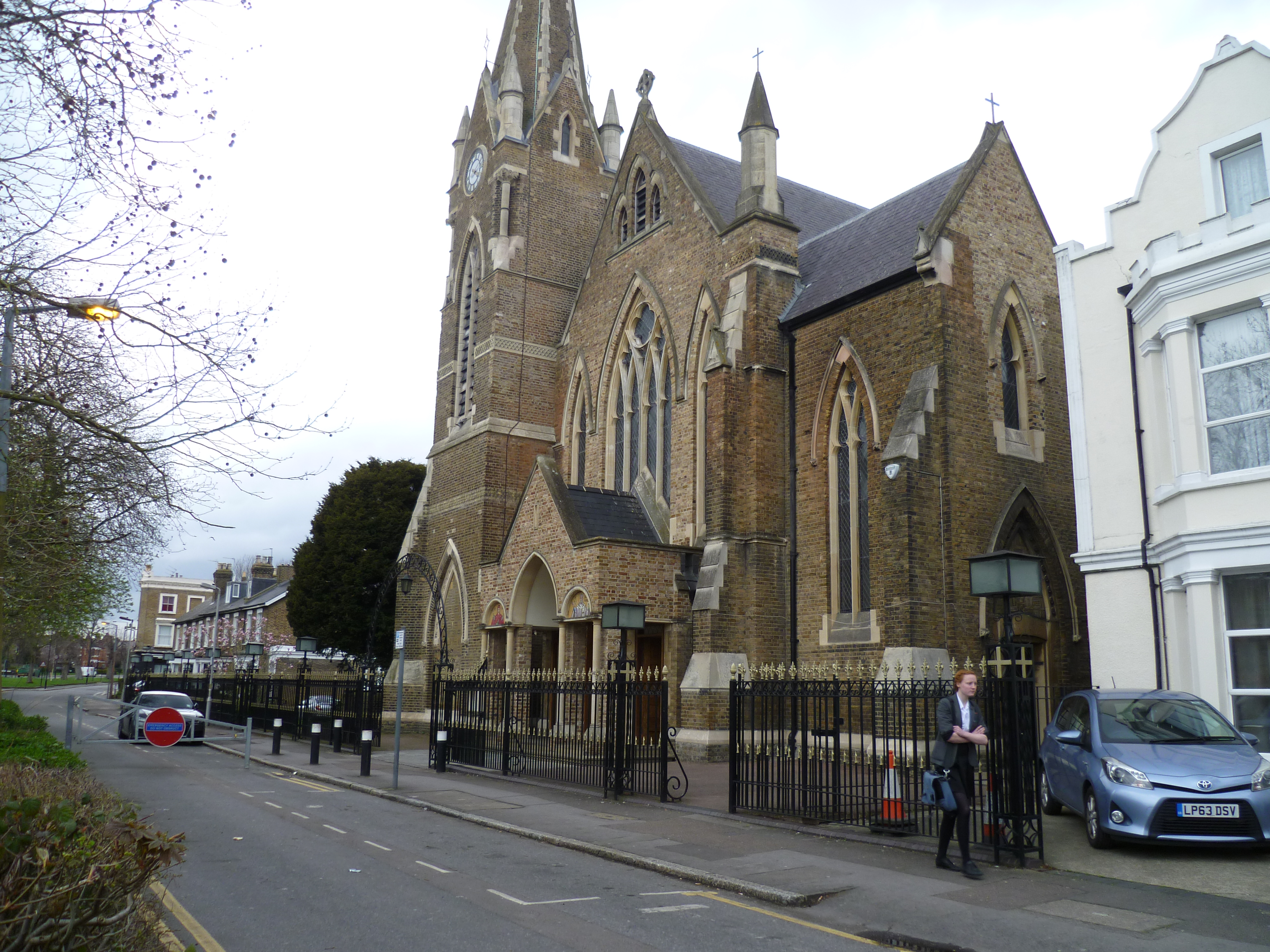
St Mary's Greek Orthodox Church

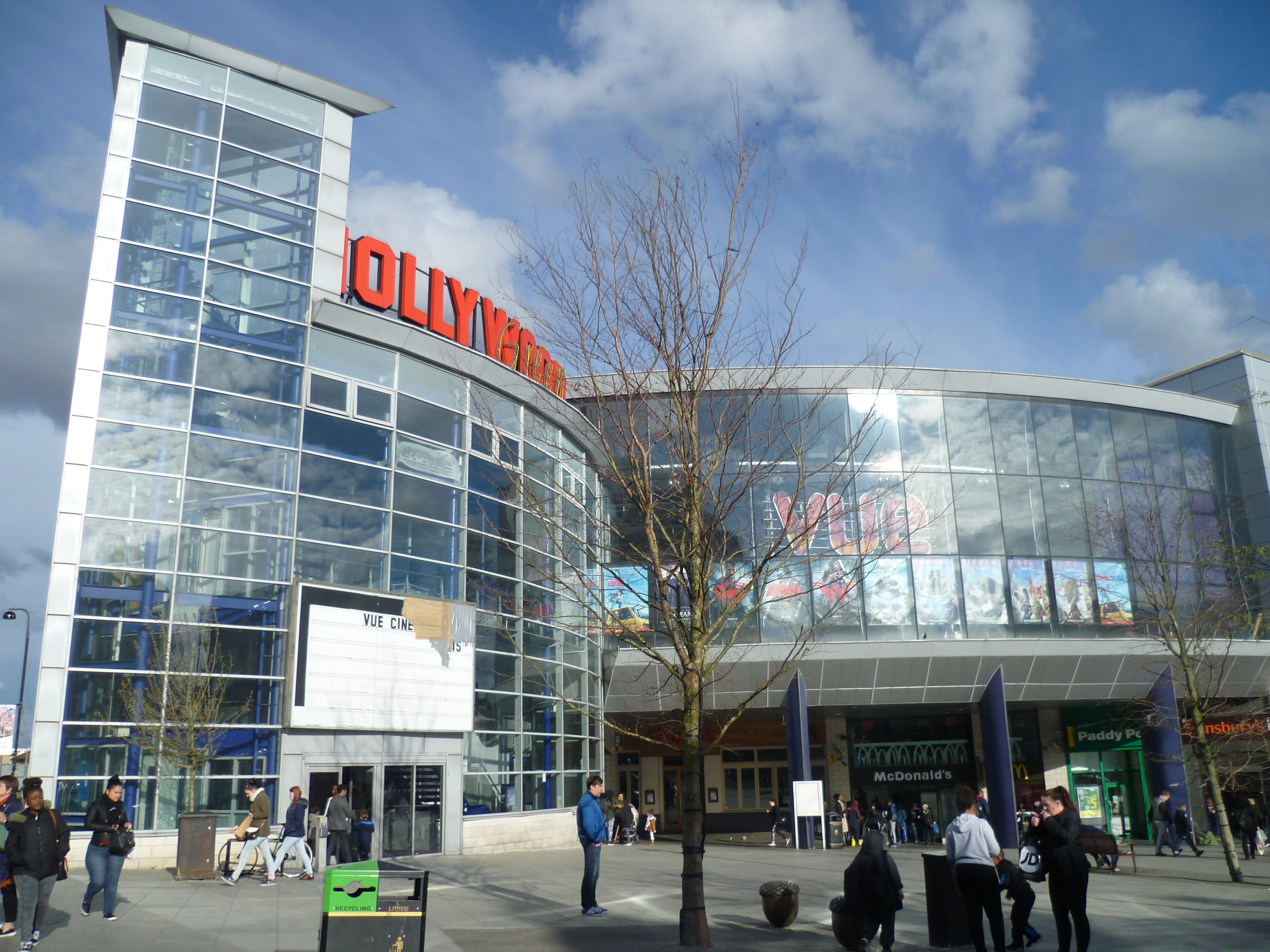
Vue cinema

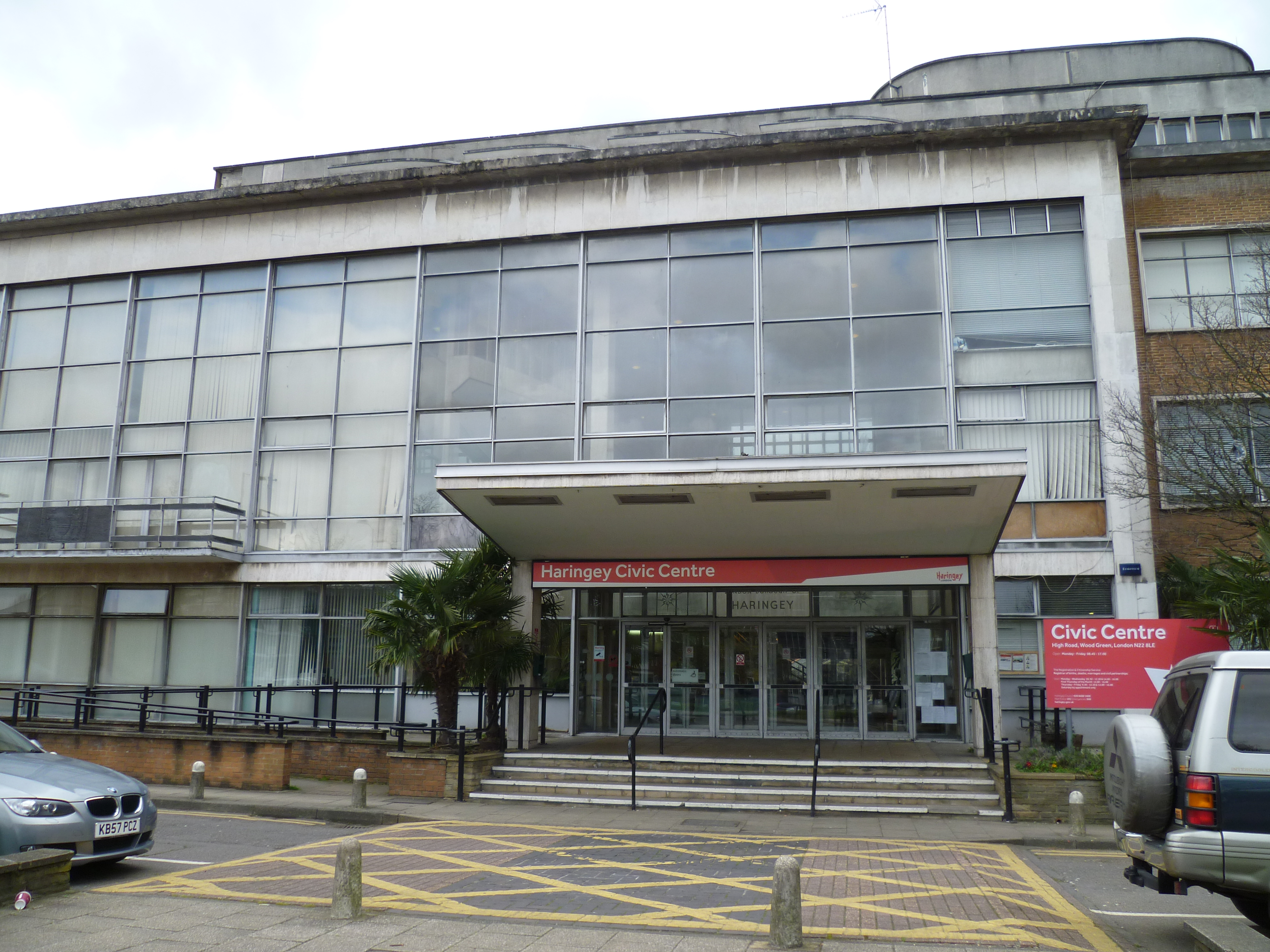
Haringey Civic Centre

== See also ==
- Noel Park
- Noel Park and Wood Green railway station
