= Former cinemas in Harringay =

In its days as an entertainment centre for London, Harringay in North London also provided more locally directed entertainment in the shape of four cinemas. The earliest was opened in 1910 and was operating as a cinema until January 2003.

== Earliest film shows in Harringay ==
From the very beginning of the 20th century, William Day, "pioneer of moving pictures", showed films in the Olympian Gardens pleasure grounds next to the Queen's Head pub. It is assumed that a marquee or large tent was used.

== Salisbury Electric Picture Hall ==
The Electric Picture Hall was a short lived affair opened at Easter 1909, but not evidenced as being open by the following year. It operated on Green Lanes, probably on the corner of Seymour Road, at number 527.

== The Premier Electric ==
The Premier Electric, designed by the architectural firm Emden & Egan, was opened on 16 April 1910. It was built for London Picture Theatre Ltd as one of a small chain of Premier Electrics. By the time it closed in January 2003 it was the UK’s oldest operating cinema. The building still stands today on Frobisher Road by Duckett's Common.

The frontage and entrance area had been designed to echo colonial India. Palm trees were scattered around the foyer to foster the colonial feel. Reporting its opening the local newspaper, the Hornsey Journal, described it in glowing terms and drew attention to its"particularly handsome" entrance.

The Most Unique Picture Theatre in London

Handsomely decorated and upholstered throughout

No expense has been spared to ensure the comfort of patrons

The very latest productions in the world of animated pictures to be seen here

The auditorium was designed in the style typical of the period with a curved and banded ceiling and proscenium arch. Seating was provided for 900 on a single floor. During the first part of its life the cinema had its own Premier Orchestra which played during all films.

The entertainment bill during its early years was typical of its day. The programme for Thursday 30 June 1910 included the following:

In the Vicinity of the Laos States – a delightful travel series giving views of the Laos States situated in South East Asia. The series comprise (sic) pictures of the natives in their rude craft skimming the currents and an exquisite sunset – truly a glorious spectacle. The Kidnapped Servant – Vexed housewives who have to face the problem of domestic servants will appreciate Brown’s position when he had to send to Zanzibar for a native! Brown junior seizes a black girl, confines her in a packing case and despatches her to London. Alas! She proves worse than the home-bred specimens. In the last amusing picture she is seen embracing the sweep, believing him to be one of her own kin – much to his disgust.

The Premier Electric saw its first changes in the early Thirties. It was bought by the River Park company and its name shortened to the Premier. In 1932 Turnpike Lane Tube Station opened nearby. Three years later as part of the development around the new station, competition arrived with the opening of the sleek new Ritz cinema.

By 1938 the Premier was under another set of owners, Gaywood Cinemas. The company also owned the nearby Palais Deluxe in Station Road, Wood Green. In that year both cinemas were modernised. The Premier closed for seven weeks on 22 January 1938.

What emerged was a new art deco cinema, renamed the Regal. The old building remained intact behind the new streamlined façade and most of the interior was left untouched apart from new seating and electrical work. The seating capacity was reduced to a more roomy 650. The cinema was set to compete.

It went through two more changes of ownership, reaching the hands of Newcastle based Essoldo in 1954. The chain also acquired the Coliseum Cinema on Green Lanes. On 6 October 1959, the Regal was renamed the Essoldo. By this time it was taking inferior class films and even showing some mild pornography.

The new owners saw more profit in bingo and converted both Harringay cinemas to bingo halls. The Frobisher Road cinema closed on 10 November 1963. However, whilst bingo seemed to succeed at the Coliseum, clearly the experiment didn't work at Frobisher Road. On 15 February 1964 it was reopened as the Curzon cinema. The new concept was to provide a small family viewing centre.

In 1977 the nearby Ritz (now operating as the ABC) was refurbished as a three screen cinema, competing directly with the Curzon's market. This was resolved by 1980 when the Curzon changed its programme to a regular diet of double sex films relieved only by Asian films on Sundays.

It closed in 1989 and, following a failed series of plans for a nightclub, indoor market, banqueting club and a community centre, it reopened in 1990 as a Quasar game centre. This use caused damage to the fabric of the building. By 1996 the cinema's use had changed again when it was used by the Edmonton-based Church of Destiny.

The church found the building needing more care and attention than its worshippers and they pulled out within a year. It was then bought by an Indian businessman, Jitu Rivall who refurbished it as a 498 seat cinema. It was decided that the pock-marked ceiling was beyond economic repair and a new suspended ceiling was fitted. The premises were also equipped with a new sound system and huge new screen, brought forward of the original proscenium. The cinema re-opened on 31 October 1997 as the New Curzon Cinema, screening Indian Bollywood films.

On 16 April 2000 the New Curzon Cinema celebrated the building's 90th birthday with a special screening of the Peter Sellers film The Smallest Show on Earth. The New Curzon Cinema could not compete with the new Cineworld multiplex in Wood Green, which also screened Asian Bollywood films and the New Curzon closed in January 2003.

It was converted once again to use as a church and the current owners, the Liberty Church, moved in a few months later.

== The Electric Coliseum ==
The Electric Coliseum Cinema was built in 1910 on the corner of Green Lanes and St Ann's Road. It opened on 16 November 1910.

In addition to seating for 650 in stalls and a small circle, there was a small stage for variety acts. The auditorium was richly decorated with gilded bas-relief plaster moulding. It was equipped with an organ, the first to be installed in any cinema in the UK. The Salon du Bal dance hall was attached to the cinema, with its own separate entrance in Salisbury Parade.

Operated as an independent cinema through its entire life, its name changed to the Coliseum Cinema around 1930 when talking films were introduced. In the late 1950s it was bought along with the Regal (Premier Electric) by the Newcastle-based Essoldo company. In 1961 Essoldo implemented plans to turn the Coliseum into a bingo hall. It closed on 3 June 1961 with a final show including Tony Curtis in Who Was That Lady and Randolph Scott in Buchanan Rides Alone.

In 1977 the bingo hall closed and the Coliseum auditorium became a furniture store. The former dance hall with its domed ceiling became a popular gay nightclub known as Bolts, hosting acts such as The Weather Girls.

The furniture store closed early in the 1980s and the cinema section was boarded up and quickly became derelict. Bolts Nightclub eventually moved out of the dance hall and it became a club/bar.

In September 1999, the cinema building was sold for re-development. Although planning permission had been sought to protect the exterior, the cinema was demolished and a block of flats erected on the site. The block of flats preserves the cinema’s name, using 'The Coliseum' in its address.

== Grand Picture Palace ==
The fourth cinema in Harringay was the Grand Picture Palace at 139 Turnpike Lane on the corner of Wightman Road. Originally owned by Adelphi Picture Theatres Ltd, it was opened in 1912. By 1915, it had experienced a change of ownership and was renamed the Grand Cinema. In 1930 it changed ownership again and was renamed the New Clarence Cinema. By 1933, the name had changed again to The Regent. It closed in 1934 and the building was finally demolished when the road layout was changed in the post-war period.

== The Ritz ==
The Ritz Cinema on the corner of Green Lanes and Carlingford Road was one of several cinemas (usually named Ritz) that were designed by Major W.J. King of Jermyn Street, London. It was built for and operated by Associated British Cinemas (ABC).

It opened on 30 December 1935 with Clark Gable in China Seas and Ricardo Cortez in Sing Me a Love Song.

The Ritz soon after opening circa 1935

The cinema's red brick exterior was designed to harmonise with the adjoining Turnpike Lane tube station. Above the main canopy over the entrance was an illuminated sign above which the name of the cinema was displayed in neon. The auditorium's decorative scheme was quite simple and consisted mainly of ornamental plasterwork decorated in green, gold and pink. There was a large cove-lit dome in the ceiling and seating was provided for 1,850 people. The cinema was also equipped with a stage, which was only occasionally used, and a cafe that was located over the entrance foyer in operation until the 1950s.

The Ritz was an immediate success and quickly became established as one of north London's most popular cinemas. All the latest advances in cinema technology were installed in the Ritz and in 1954 the cinema presented several films in 3D.

It was re-named ABC Turnpike Lane from 9 October 1961.

The cinema was closed for conversion into a multi-screen cinema on 11 June 1977. It reopened on 29 September 1977 with 625 seats in the former circle and two screens in the former stalls seating 417 and 316. In 1986, a year after its half-centenary celebrations, it was renamed Cannon when the Cannon Group took control of ABC/ EMI.

From 17 July 1988 it was taken over by the independent Coronet Cinemas chain and was re-named Coronet Cinema. Its decline was remarked on by the Time Out Guide of 1995. The guide referred to the cinema as "one of the last two smoking cinemas in London..". They concluded ".. and we recommend it for demolition".

In the closing years of the twentieth century, London Transport, who owned the land on which the cinema was built, planned to extend the bus station behind Turnpike Lane tube station and needed to demolish the cinema. The Coronet cinema was closed on 25 March 1999 with Patch Adams, This Year's Love and Urban Legend the last films screened, and was demolished in August 1999. The site is now occupied by the new bus station.

== Sources ==
- Tapsell, Martin, "The Oldest Cinema: The Harringay Contender", Picture House, vol 24, Autumn 1999, Cinema Theatre Association
- Jones, David & Whelan, Kevin, The ABC Turnpike Lane, ABC Cinemas, 1985, ISBN 0-9509272-4-4
- Ticher, Mike (1999). Hornsey Historical Society Bulletin, No. 40. Hornsey Historical Society.
- Roe, Ken on Cinema Treasures
- Buck, Jeremy, "Cinemas of Haringey", Hornsey Historical Society, 2010, ISBN 978-0-905794-41-9
- Kinematograph Directories, 1914, 1927, 1929, 1931, 1935, 1959
