= Turnpike Lane =

Turnpike Lane may refer to:

- Turnpike Lane, Haringey, a street in the London Borough of Haringey
- Turnpike Lane tube station
