= National Westminster Bank, Palmers Green =

Coordinates: 51°37′06″N 0°06′28″W

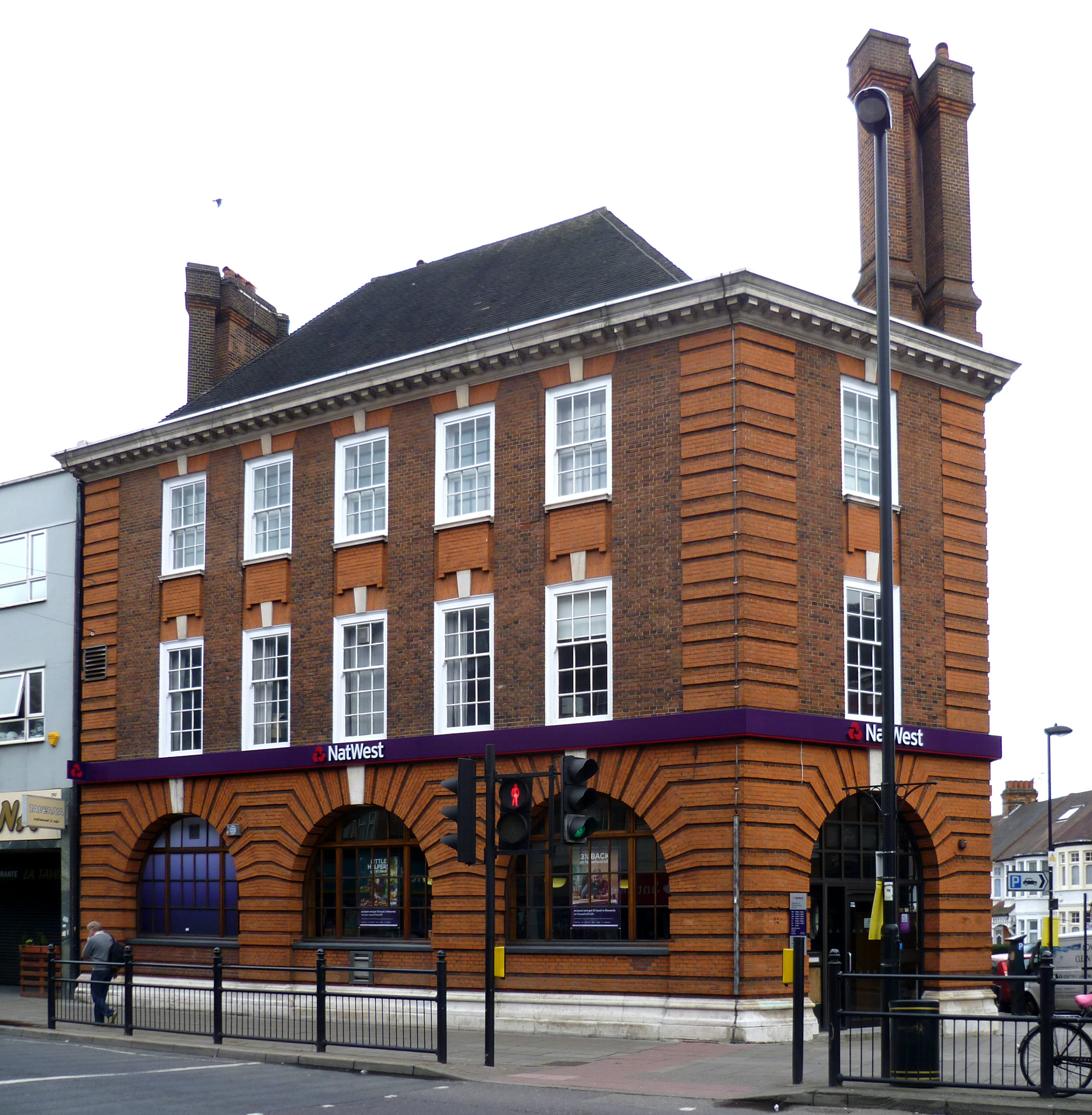
National Westminster Bank, Palmers Green.

The National Westminster Bank at 288 Green Lanes in Palmers Green, London, is a grade II listed building with Historic England. It was designed by Arthur Sykes in 1913.

== Gallery ==
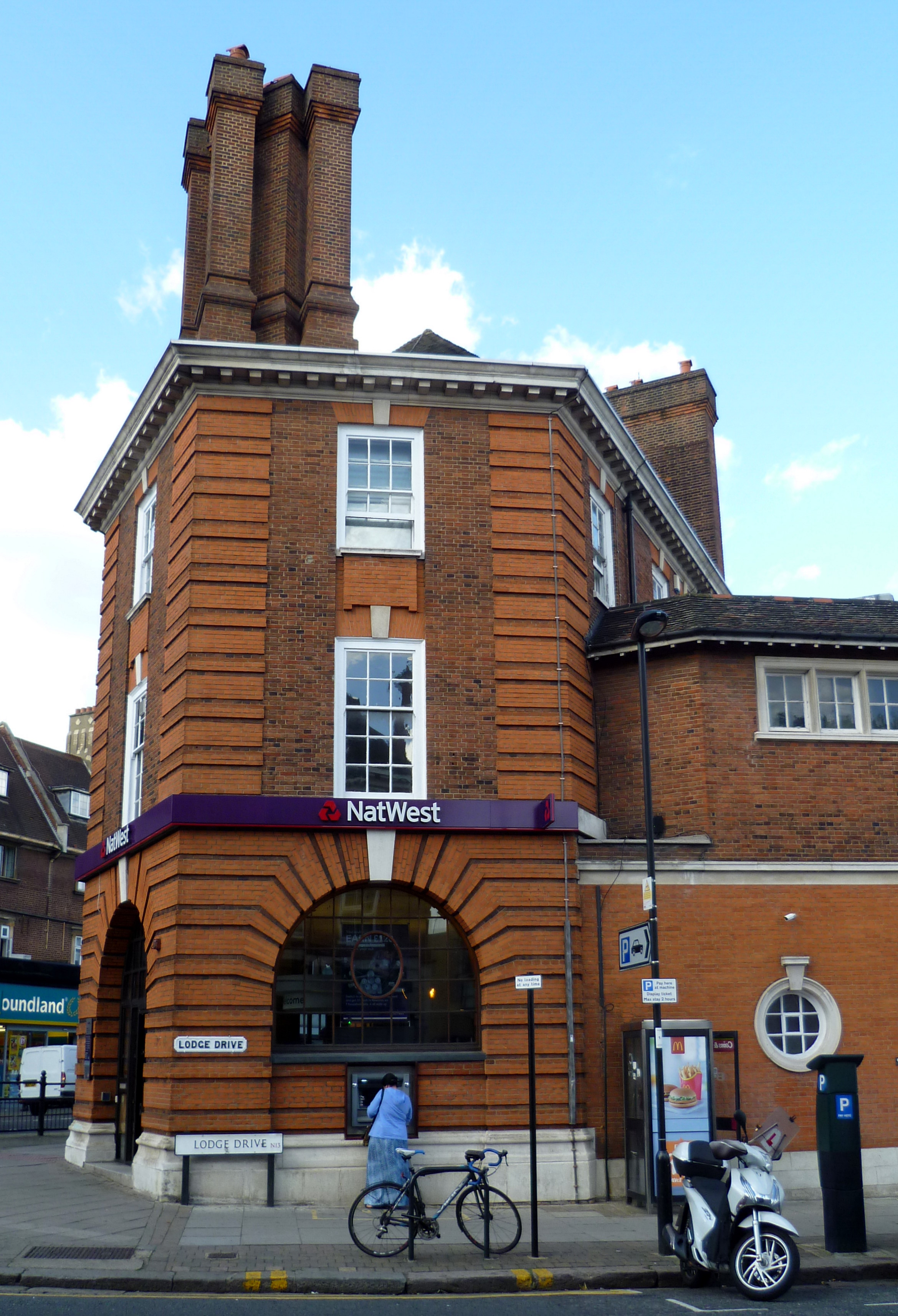

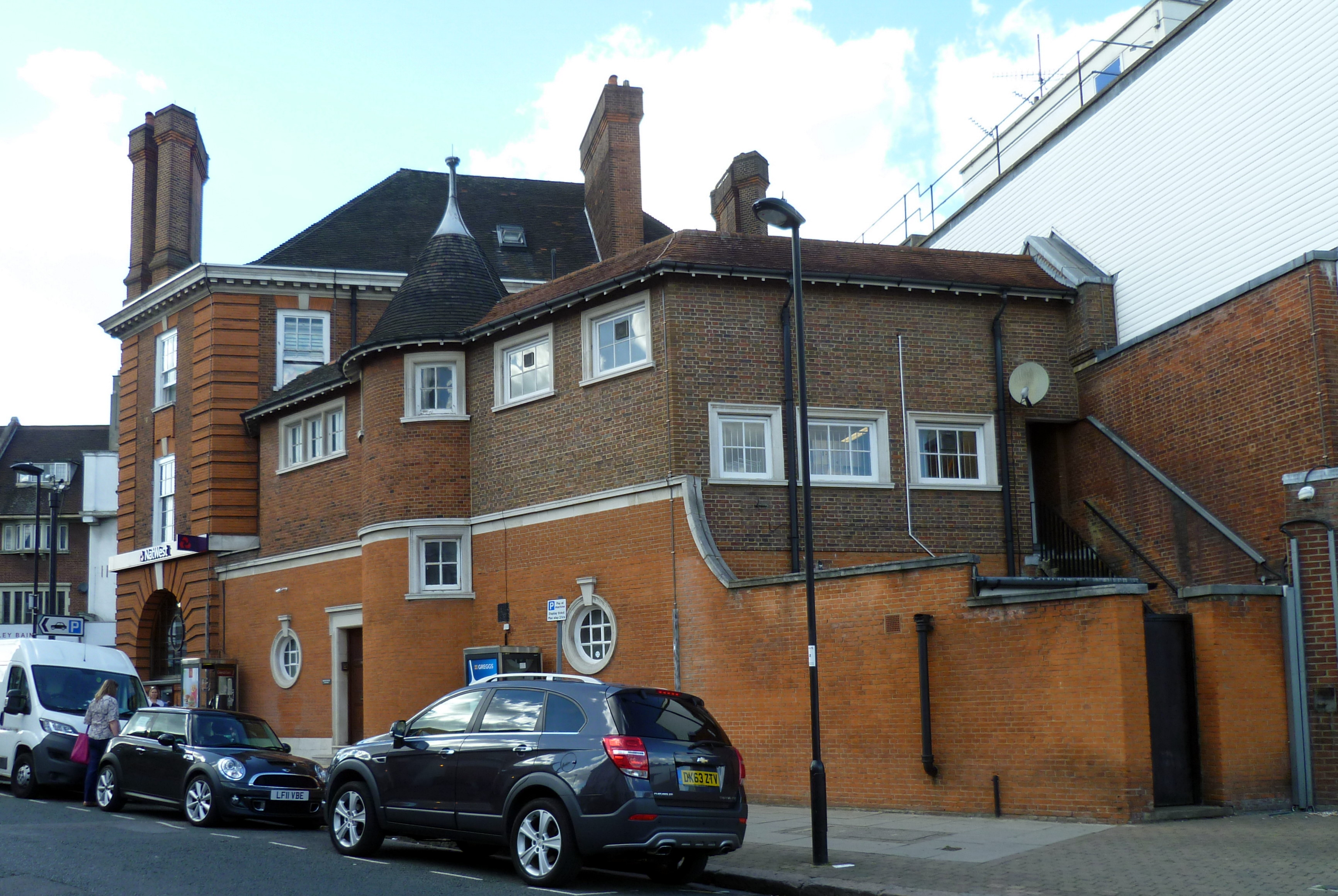

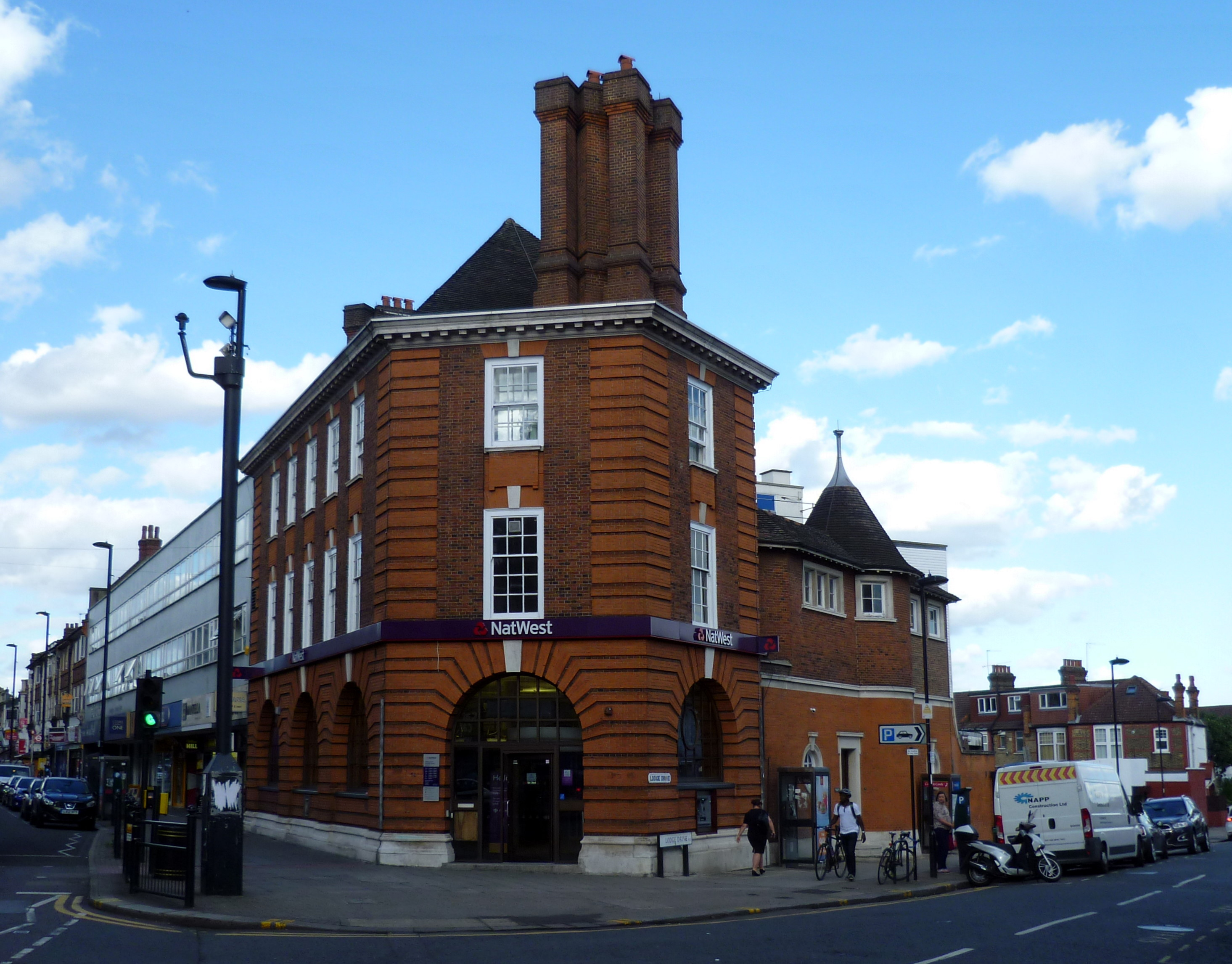
