= Langham Working Men's Club =

Working men's club in Haringey, London

Coordinates: 51.5846°N 0.0999°W

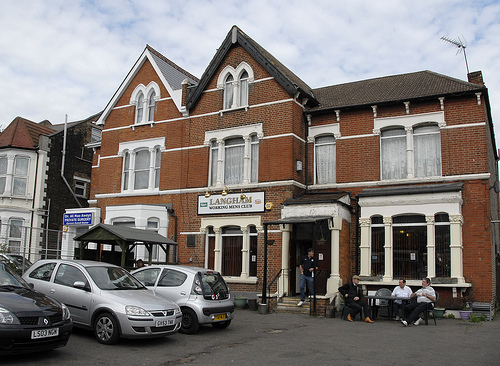
Langham Working Men's Club

The Langham Working Men's Club is a traditional working men's club in the north London neighbourhood of Harringay

== History ==
The club's predecessor was the Hornsey Social Club, which was open between 1907 and 1910, and was found at 31 Turnpike Lane. The Secretary was a certain Mr. C.H. Pritlove. The club then became the Langham (Non Political) Club and Institute, named after a nearby road, and was registered under the Friendly Societies Act on 13 May 1910. It soon affiliated to the Working Men's Club and Institute Union. The club relocated to its current premises on Harringay's Green Lanes in 1915.

To begin with, the building was a large double-fronted house but it was extended back away from the road to provide additional rooms. A dance floor was laid in the new concert room. Later on a snooker room was provided upstairs where the offices are also located.

It was fortunate to avoid being bombed during the war though a few nearby streets suffered direct hits. It set up a very popular amateur boxing club and was the venue for local tournaments as well as for training. A collapsible boxing ring was erected inside one of the main rooms for this. The club produced a few boxing champions as well such as Amateur Boxing Association middleweight J. Hockley in 1944 and lightweight A. Lewis in 1949, as well as S. Lewis, Middleweight Champion in 1949. The club's proximity to the nearby Harringay Arena may well have encouraged an interest in the sport. Lack of outdoor facilities meant that an indoor one was preferable. In the 1960s the club committee thought the original boxing ring might be stored under the stage but they found only some old Christmas decorations. Many previous artefacts and documents were destroyed by a fire.

The Lord Mayor of Haringey in 1967 was Mrs A.F. Remington and she pulled the first pint in the new lounge of the Langham that year. As she did, she declared that as it was a working men's club, she presumed they would be taking their wives along as well. In her view 'all wives were working women.' It did appear to be a women-friendly club even in the days when women were not welcome in others.

== Activities ==
The club is still active, although there is no longer any boxing at the venue. It has been described by President, Mr. Robert Mead, as a "family club" where everyone knows everyone else, and one that looks after its members. It cares for others in the community and has always been involved in charity work. The club hosted the Lord Mayor's charity event in 2006.

Apart from regular charities that it supports, the members organise spontaneous collections such as when the Asian tsunami hit back on Boxing Day 2006. There was a marathon darts playing session plus various other activities to raise money for those caught up in the disaster.

Regular entertainment is usually arranged for Saturday and Sunday evenings with some special events on Fridays, such as quizzes. Bingo is also played and the venue has snooker tables. A local line dancing club holds its events in the large function room once a week.

To conform with the 2007 smoking ban, a "smoker’s den" was set up in the forecourt area.

== Sources ==
- Robertson, J.G., Leading Working Men's Clubs of England, London 1952.
- The Economist, Vol 311, 1989
- Club Historians website
