= Harringay =

District in north London, England

Coordinates: 51.5819°N 0.0994°W

- Location within Greater London
- Population: 22,627 (2011 Census)
- OS grid reference: TQ316678
- London borough: Haringey
- Ceremonial county: Greater London
- Region: London
- Country: England
- Sovereign state: United Kingdom
- Post town: LONDON
- Postcode district: N4, N8, N15
- Dialling code: 020
- UK Parliament: Hornsey and Friern Barnet
- London Assembly: Enfield and Haringey

Harringay (pronounced /ˈhærɪŋɡeɪ/ HARR-ing-gay) is a district of north London, England, within the London Borough of Haringey. It is centred on the section of Green Lanes running between the New River, where it crosses Green Lanes by Finsbury Park, and Duckett's Common, near Turnpike Lane.

== Location ==
The boundaries of Harringay form a rough boot shape in the extreme southern centre of the borough of Haringey. The western boundary of Harringay is formed by the East Coast Main Line. The northern boundary is to the south of Turnpike Lane, running parallel to it, somewhere between Sydney Road and Fairfax Road. In the northeast, the boundary roughly corresponds with a line drawn between the south of Duckett's Common and the north end of Warwick Gardens. A line due south of this point, as far as Eade Road, forms the eastern boundary. Southeast of here a line to Finsbury Park completes the southeastern limits. Finsbury Park is officially part of Harringay and forms the south western boundary.

From north to south, between the tip of Finsbury Park and the top of Ducketts Common, Harringay measures about 1 3/4 miles (2.8 km). At its widest point, from east to west, it measures about 1/2 mile (0.80 km).

== Locale ==
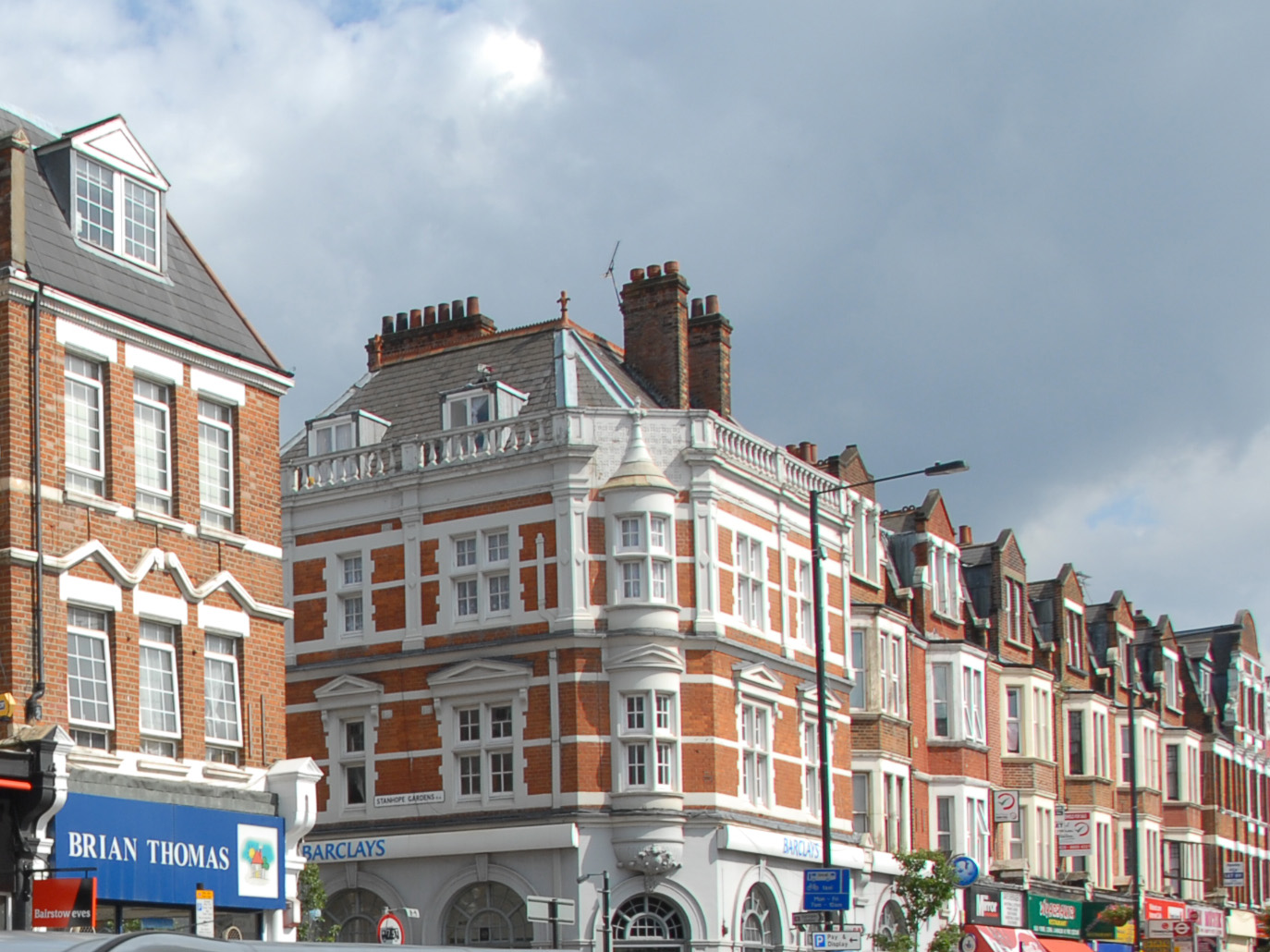
A section of Grand Parade, Green Lanes, Harringay

Harringay's main shopping street, Green Lanes, is a busy, cosmopolitan high street. Some shops have a long-established presence. Others reflect the more cosmopolitan nature of Green Lanes and include a large number of Turkish bakeries, grocers, cafes and a growing cluster of restaurants. There are several pubs including the Grade II listed and Pevsner-noted 'Salisbury'. Parts of the 1980 film The Long Good Friday and the 1992 film Chaplin were shot there.

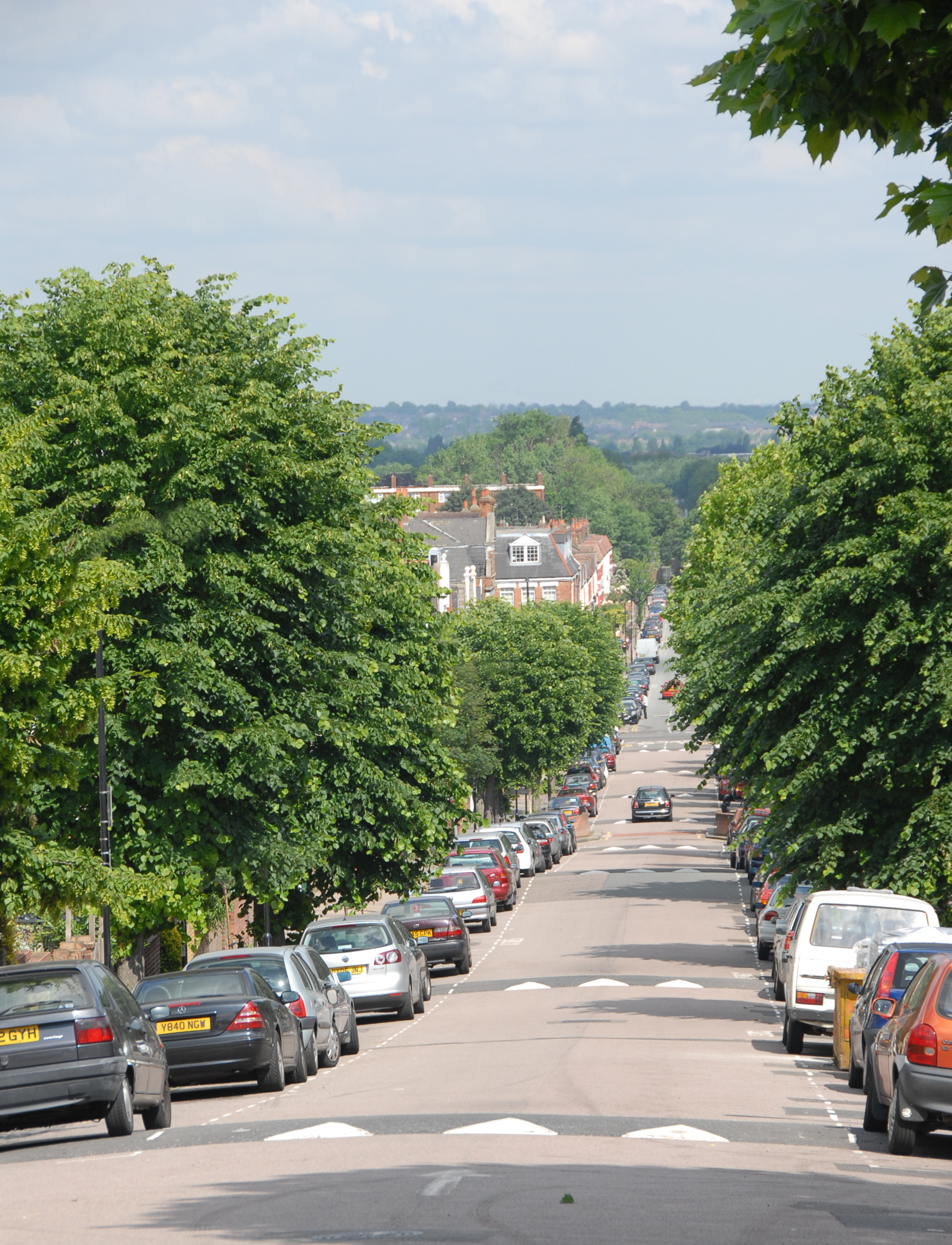
One of the residential streets on the Harringay Ladder, looking due east.

Towards the southern end stands the well-preserved, Victoriana-laden 'Beaconsfield' public house. Opposite is the Arena Shopping Park which contains a handful of national multiples outlets, a Sainsbury's supermarket, and one of Britain's first "drive-thru" McDonald's restaurants.

A large section of the eastern side of Green Lanes is called Grand Parade. Interrupted only by the gaps introduced by the residential roads running eastwards, Grand Parade runs for nearly half a kilometre from just north of Harringay Green Lanes railway station to St Ann's Road.

The streets to the west of Green Lanes are known as the 'Harringay Ladder' (due to their similarity to a ladder when seen on a map). The streets to the east behind Grand Parade are known as 'The Gardens'. To the south of 'The Gardens' and Sainsbury's is Harringay's 'Warehouse District'; to the north is 'Woodlands Park'.

== Geography and geology ==
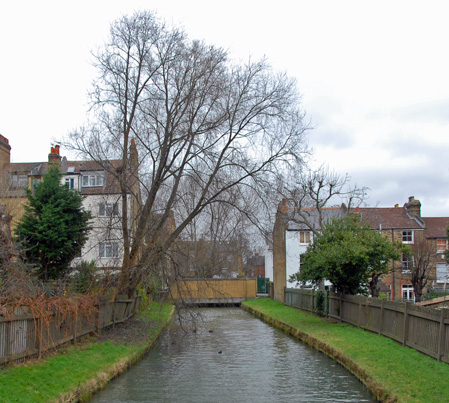
The New River passing between the houses of the Harringay Ladder

Harringay is just under 5 1/2 miles (9 km) from the centre of London sitting on a chalk bed covered by a thick layer of London Clay. The western part of the district is hilly, rising to 138 feet (42 m) at its highest. Further to the west, beyond Harringay, the ground rises steadily to one of the highest points in London at Hampstead Heath, about 3 1/2 miles (6 km) away. The eastern part of Harringay is low-lying, at between 60 and 90 feet, as the land descends towards the Lea Valley, 2 miles (3 km) to the east.

Harringay covers an area of approximately 3/4 square mile (2 km^{2}). The land use for the area is shown in the table below.

Land use in Harringay
Land use type	Percentage of total area
Domestic gardens	22.54
Green space	20.36
Road	18.06
Domestic buildings	17.31
Other land uses	6.69
Non-domestic buildings	5.76
Rail	3.32
Path	1.06
Water	0.55

The only waterway still running above ground is the man-made New River, constructed in 1619 to bring water into London from Hertfordshire. However, two natural rivers still flow through Harringay beneath the ground. These are just two of the many springs and streams that used to flow through this part of London from the high ground to the west, down into the River Lea. Stonebridge Brook ran above ground meandering eastwards just to the north of the old Harringay House. It crossed the estate, running roughly beneath present-day Effingham and Fairfax Roads, ran along Green Lanes for a short way, and then eastwards north of St Ann's Road and on to the River Lea. Although still flowing underground today, the Harringay section was fully culverted by 1885. Hermitage Brook flowed roughly along the southern boundary of the western part of Harringay and then, staying close to its southern edge, under where the Arena Shopping Park stands today. It was eventually culverted, and now flows underground just to the south of the shopping park.

== History ==
=== Historical outline ===
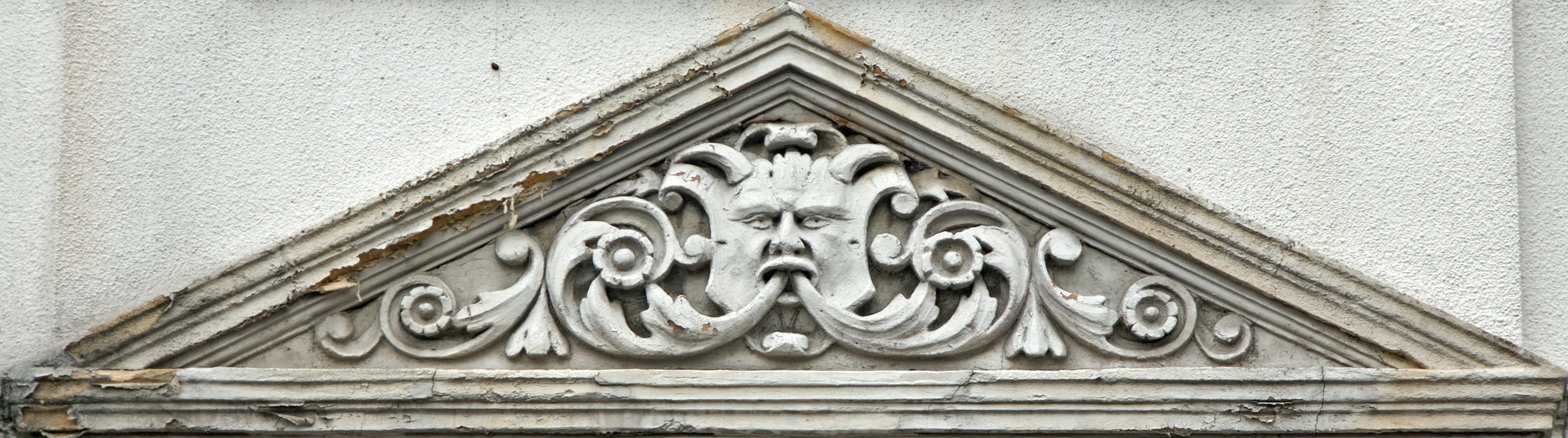
Tympanum style ornamentation with a bas-relief Green Man decoration on one of the Grand Parade Buildings

In the Ice Age Harringay was on the edge of a huge glacial mass that reached as far south as Muswell Hill.

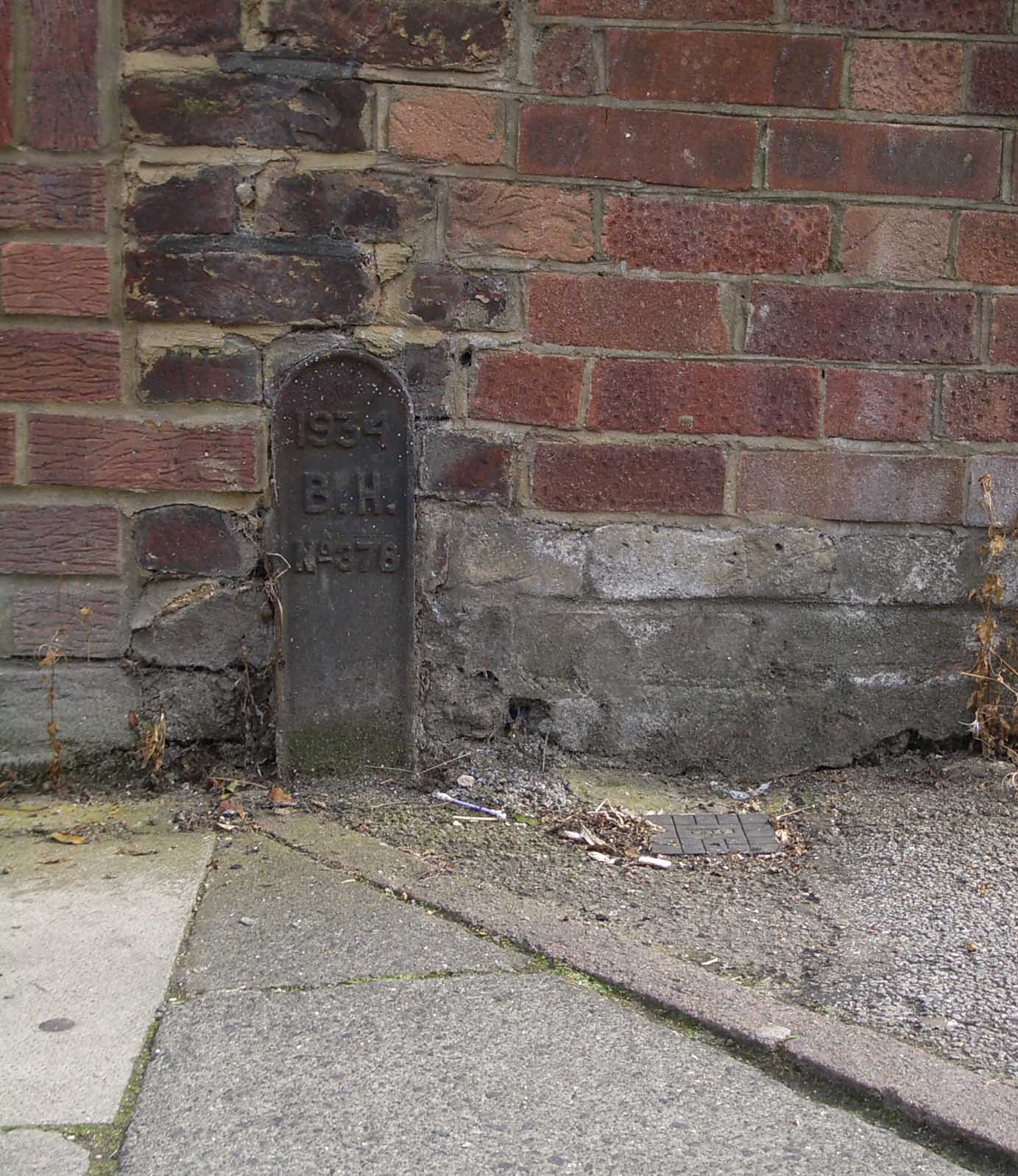
Boundary marker on Seymour Road. Note paving to the east (ex-Tottenham), tarmac to the west (ex-Hornsey)

The area was then largely covered with forest until the Middle Ages when it was developed as agricultural land. From 1750 to 1880 Harringay experienced the pressures of the burgeoning population in London. Gradually inroads into the pastoral landscape were made, first for the leisure and then for the settlement of Londoners. By 1900 Harringay had become a respectable London-adjacent suburb with all the land built over and only Finsbury Park remaining as a hint of its former character. It remained part of Middlesex and was not within the jurisdiction of the County of London until 1965. Identified as a single unified urban area from 1900, Harringay was originally split between the old boroughs of Hornsey and Tottenham with the boundary between the two running slightly to the west of Green Lanes The unification of the two boroughs in 1965, as the London Borough of Haringey, brought all Harringay under the control of a single unit of local governance for the first time in more than a thousand years. On many of the roads in West Harringay, it is still possible to see the old Tottenham - Hornsey boundary where the paving stones give way to tarmacked pavement. The old parish / borough boundary markers are also still in place on some roads (see picture, right).

=== Toponymy ===
The name Harringay has its origin in the Saxon period and is derived from the name of a Saxon chieftain called Haering. Haering's Hege meant Haering's enclosure. The earliest written form of the name was recorded as Harenhg’ in about 1195. Its development thereafter gave rise to the modern-day names of Harringay (the district of London), the London Borough of Haringey and Hornsey (another nearby district of London).

=== Entertainment ===
From 1750 until the second half of the 20th century, Harringay became a destination for Londoners seeking to relax. Hornsey Wood House, Finsbury Park, Harringay Stadium and Harringay Arena were all popular leisure destinations in their day. The stadium and arena site is now occupied by Sainsbury's and the Arena Shopping Park. In the 21st century, Harringay continues to attract visitors from across London and beyond to visit the ever-growing number of popular restaurants, bars, festivals and live music venues. In the years since 2010, the festivals, bar and music studios of the creative hub in the Harringay Warehouse District are also attracting people to Harringay as an entertainment centre.

=== Transport and communications history ===
There is little doubt that the history of transport communications through Harringay had a significant effect on its shape today. In Roman times, a great roadway through the area to the north was established. This roadway endured as a great communication passage to the north and brought much activity through the heart of the area. It also acted as the rough dividing line for land ownership, identifying Harringay's position on the edge of manorial and subsequently borough boundaries.

In the mid-19th century, the arrival of the Great Northern Railway (GNR) cleaved western Harringay from the rest of the Borough of Hornsey and set it fair for its subsequent union with the southwesternmost slice of the Borough of Tottenham. The subsequent construction of the Tottenham & Hampstead Junction Railway (THJR) almost defined Harringay's present-day southern boundary.

== Demographics ==
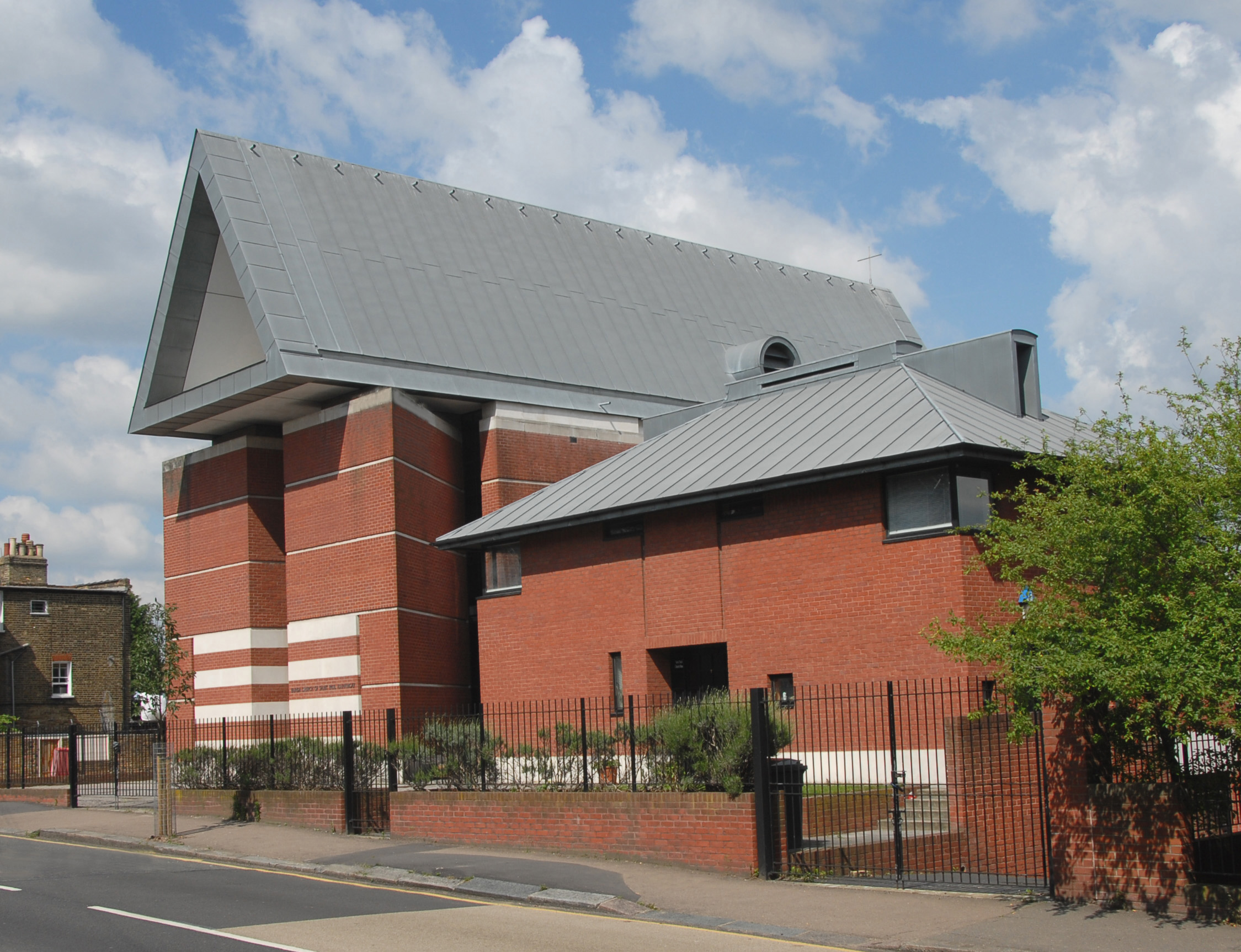
The striking Modernist St Paul's Church & Vicarage, Wightman Road, Harringay - called the dazzling St Paul's by The Guardian's Simon Jenkins

At the 2011 census, the population of Harringay was about 22,136.

The ethnic breakdown is: 64% white, 12% black, 12% Asian, 6% Mixed and 5% other. 71% of its inhabitants were born in Europe, with 12% in Asia, 7% in Africa (mainly eastern & southern), and 1% in North America. Within this mix 3% were born in Turkey.

About 41% of the population report themselves as Christian, 14% as Muslim, 1% as Jewish and 40% as not religious or no religion stated.

60% of residents are classified as being in the A/B & C1 NRS social grades.

Of a total of around 9,199 dwellings in Harringay, approximately 39% are owner-occupied and about 44% are privately rented accommodation. 14% are public or other council housing. About 40% of the dwellings are houses, with the remainder being flats, most often converted from the largely Victorian housing stock.

== Education ==
There are four generally well regarded schools located within Harringay. These are shown below together with the number of places available in 2018:

- North Harringay Primary (460)
- South Harringay Infants (241)
- South Harringay Junior (218)
- Chestnuts Primary (461)

Inspection reports on Harringay's four schools are available at the Ofsted website.

== Sport ==
Harringay became both nationally and internationally famous for the sporting events that were held in the Harringay Stadium and the Harringay Arena from the late 1920s until the 1980s. Greyhound racing, boxing and speedway were the main attractions. Today, Harringay is home to the London Meteors who are based in the former cricket pitch in Finsbury Park, at the corner of Endymion Road and Green Lanes.

== Green Harringay ==
22.5% of Harringay is open space:

- Finsbury Park - officially part of Harringay
- The Green Flag awarded Railway Fields Local Nature Reserve, near Harringay Green Lanes Station
- The New River Path, accessible from Wightman Road and from Green Lanes opposite Finsbury Park
- Ducketts Common, opposite Turnpike Lane station
- A very small area of open land called Harringay Stadium Slopes to the south and east of Sainsbury's car park, above Hermitage Road, accessible from Surrey Gardens, off Finsbury Park Avenue
- Fairland Park, Falkland Road, N8
- The roof garden at North Harringay Primary School
- A small, but very well kept and award-winning, community garden in Doncaster Gardens (off Stanhope Gardens)

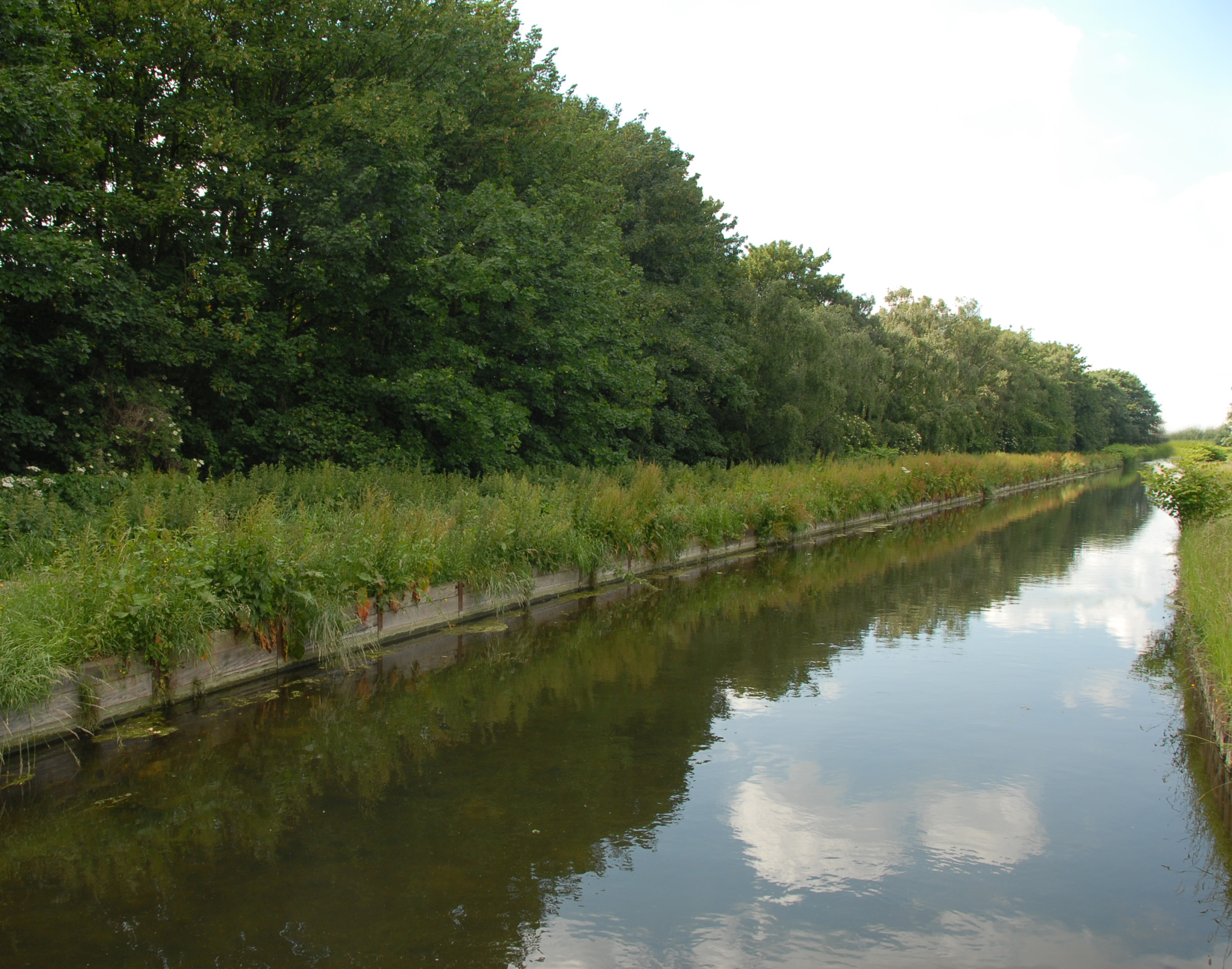
Behind busy Wightman Road - the New River Path

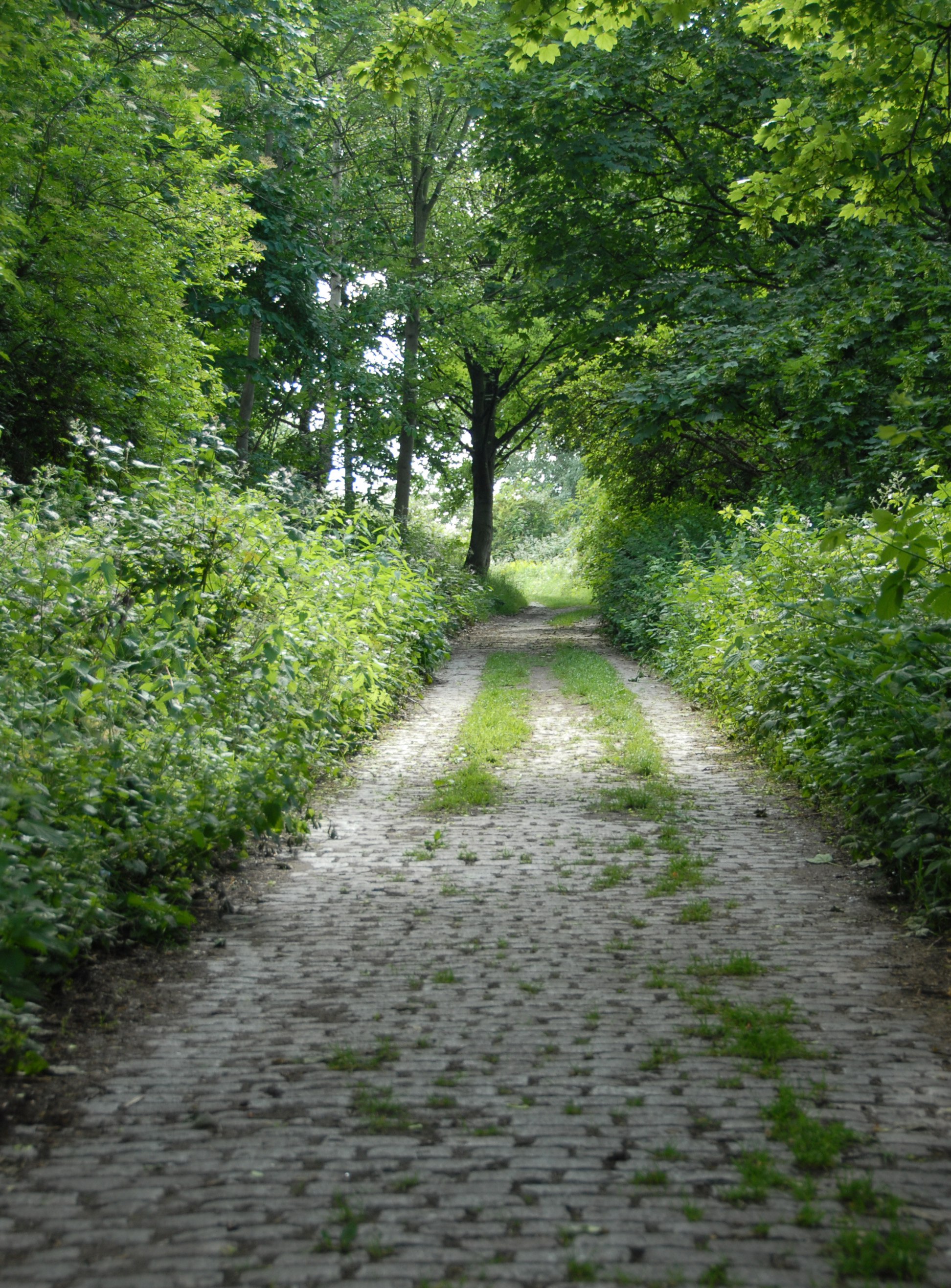
A haven of tranquility on Green Lanes - Railway Fields, Harringay

Also close by are:

- The Parkland Walk, running through nearby Stroud Green up to Highgate
- Alexandra Park
- Queen's Wood
- Woodberry Wetlands (formerly known as 'East Reservoir' between Harringay & Stoke Newington)
- Highgate Wood
- Chestnuts Park, by St Ann's Road
- Priory Park, at the end of Hornsey High Street

== People from Harringay ==
See Category:People from Harringay

== Harringay on film and television ==
Films shot in part or in their entirety in Harringay include:

- London River (2009)
- Broken Lines (2008)
- Jhoom Barabar Jhoom (2006)
- The Lives of the Saints (2006)
- Spider (2002)
- Face (1997)
- Chaplin (1992)
- The Fourth Protocol (film) (1987)
- The Long Good Friday (1980)
- The Angel Who Pawned her Heart (1954)

TV productions in Harringay include:

- Harringay Arena was the home of the Horse of the Year Show for its first ten years, from 1947 onwards. In 1958, the show featured in the first broadcast of the BBC's new Saturday afternoon sports programme Grandstand.
- Harringay Stadium was the home of Greyhound racing on London Weekend Television's World of Sport between 1972 and 1982.
- Murder Prevention (2004; Channel 5) – shot in and around Harringay, Stroud Green and Crouch End

== Transport and local area ==
=== Nearest places ===
- Stroud Green
- Crouch End
- Muswell Hill
- Stoke Newington
- Hornsey
- Turnpike Lane
- Wood Green
- St Ann's
- West Green
- Finsbury Park
- Manor House

=== Places of interest ===
- St Paul's Church – striking modernist church on Wightman Road
- The Salisbury – well-preserved Victorian pub; listed by English Heritage
- Hornsey Church – 13th-century church tower
- See also Green Harringay above
- Harringay Warehouse District

=== Nearest railway stations ===
- Harringay Green Lanes
- Harringay
- Hornsey

=== Nearest Underground stations ===
- Manor House
- Turnpike Lane

=== Buses ===
There are three bus routes that connect Green Lanes with the City and the West End: the 29, 141, and 341. The nearby Turnpike Lane bus station offers further connection to the west, east and north.

== See also ==
- Langham Working Men's Club
- Harringay Racers - a speedway team based at Harringay Stadium
- Harringay Greyhounds - an ice hockey team based at Harringay Arena
- Maynards - a sweet factory in Vale Road
