= Ducketts Common =

Park in Haringey, London

Coordinates: 51°35′17″N 0°06′09″W

Duckett's Common
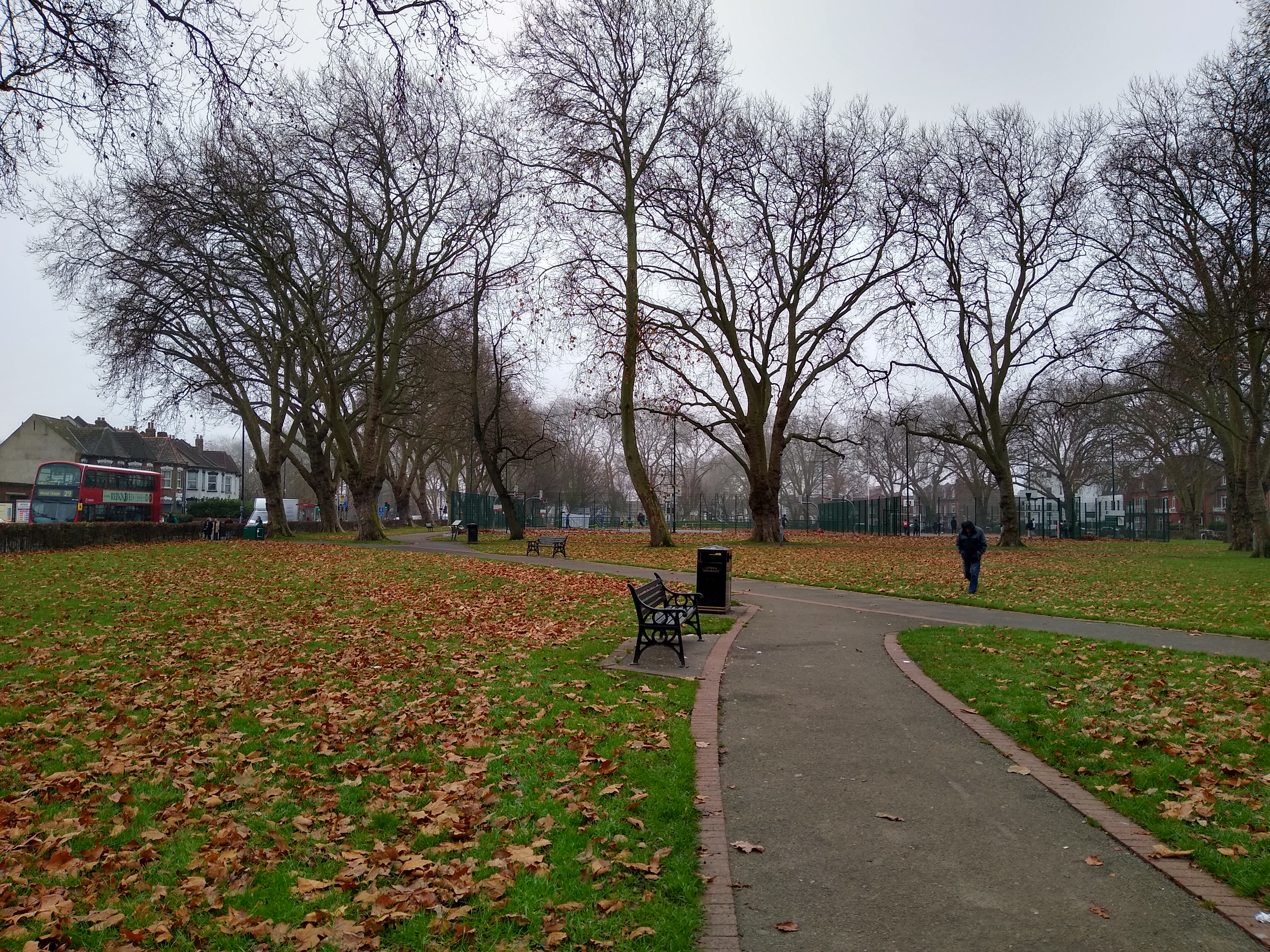
- Interactive map of Duckett's Common
- Location: Harringay, London, N8
- Area: 1.7 hectares (4.2 acres)
- Operator: London Borough of Haringey
- Open: 24 hours
- Awards: Green Flag Award since 2014
- Designation: Public Park
- Public transit: Tube: Turnpike Lane, Buses: 29, 141, 41, 67, 230, W4

Duckett's Common, together with Green Gate Common, form a public park in Harringay, in the London Borough of Haringey. The park is located opposite Turnpike Lane Underground station, on Green Lanes. It offers several amenities including an outdoor gym and basketball courts.

Green Gate Common is a small area of open space located just across Green Lanes from Ducketts Common, and it is thought that air raid shelters may exist beneath it.

The name "Ducketts" originated from Laurence Duket, a thirteenth-century landowner. The Tottenham Urban District Council converted the common into a recreation ground in 1900. Those works included the planting of 140 trees; a further 30 trees were provided by the Metropolitan Public Gardens Association in 1912. Many of the original trees survive.

The wildflower meadows on Duckett's Common contain more than 30 wildflowers native to the area. They have been established since 2011 in more than 10,000 volunteer hours by members of ChristChurch London, other Christians from around the Turnpike Lane area and local residents. The wildflower meadows are summer meadows with one hay cut in mid-August and a second towards the end of the year. Many insects such as various bumble bees, butterflies and wild solitary bees are attracted by the nectar-rich wildflowers.

ChristChurch, London also purchased and planted more than 10,000 spring bulbs (two crocus varieties and snowdrops) which provide a rich colour tapestry during the early months of the year.

== Recognition ==
Duckett's Common was awarded a London in Bloom "silver gilt" award in 2013 and a Green Flag award in 2014.

== Gallery ==
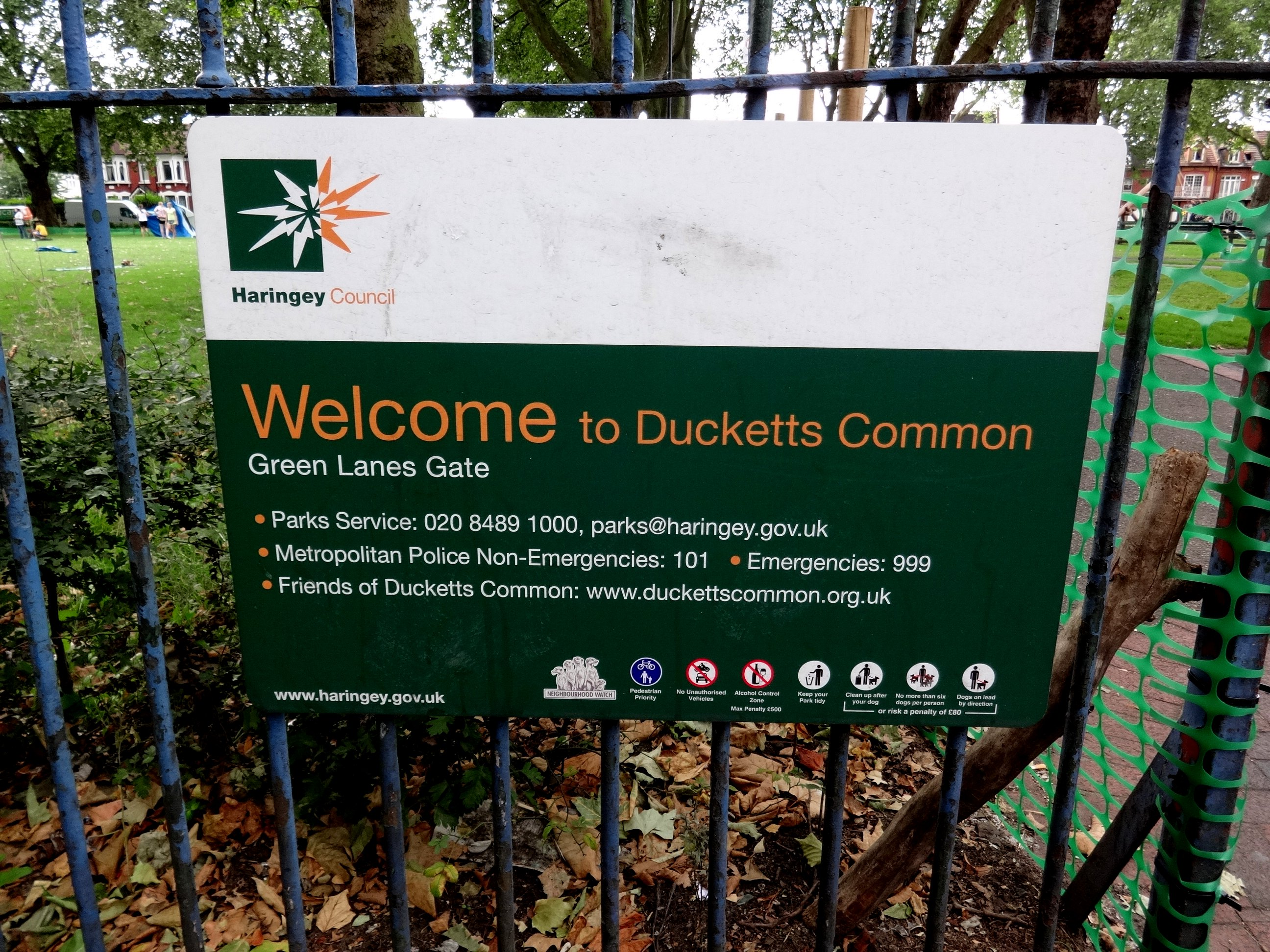
Park Signage

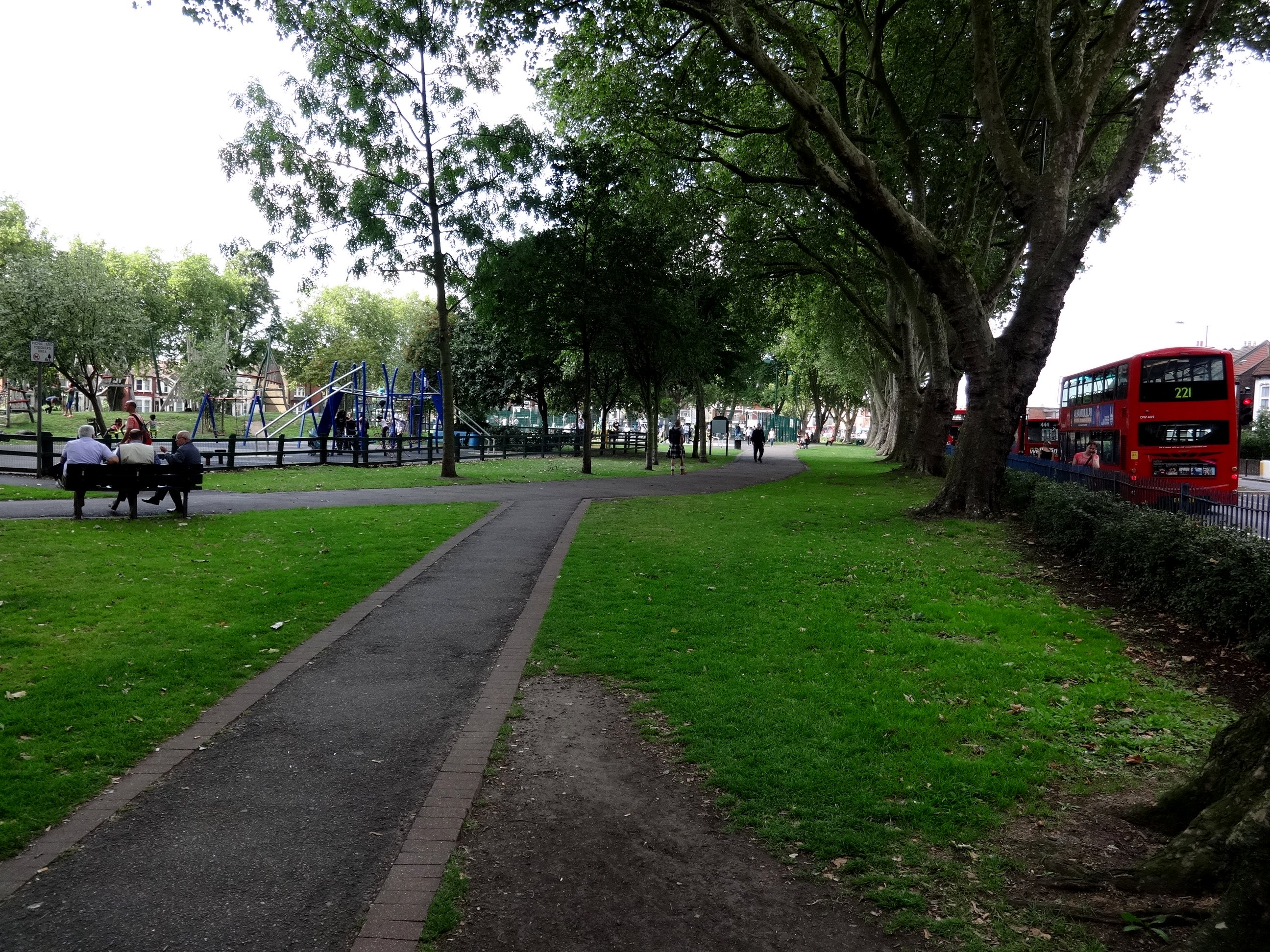
Outdoor gym and basketball courts

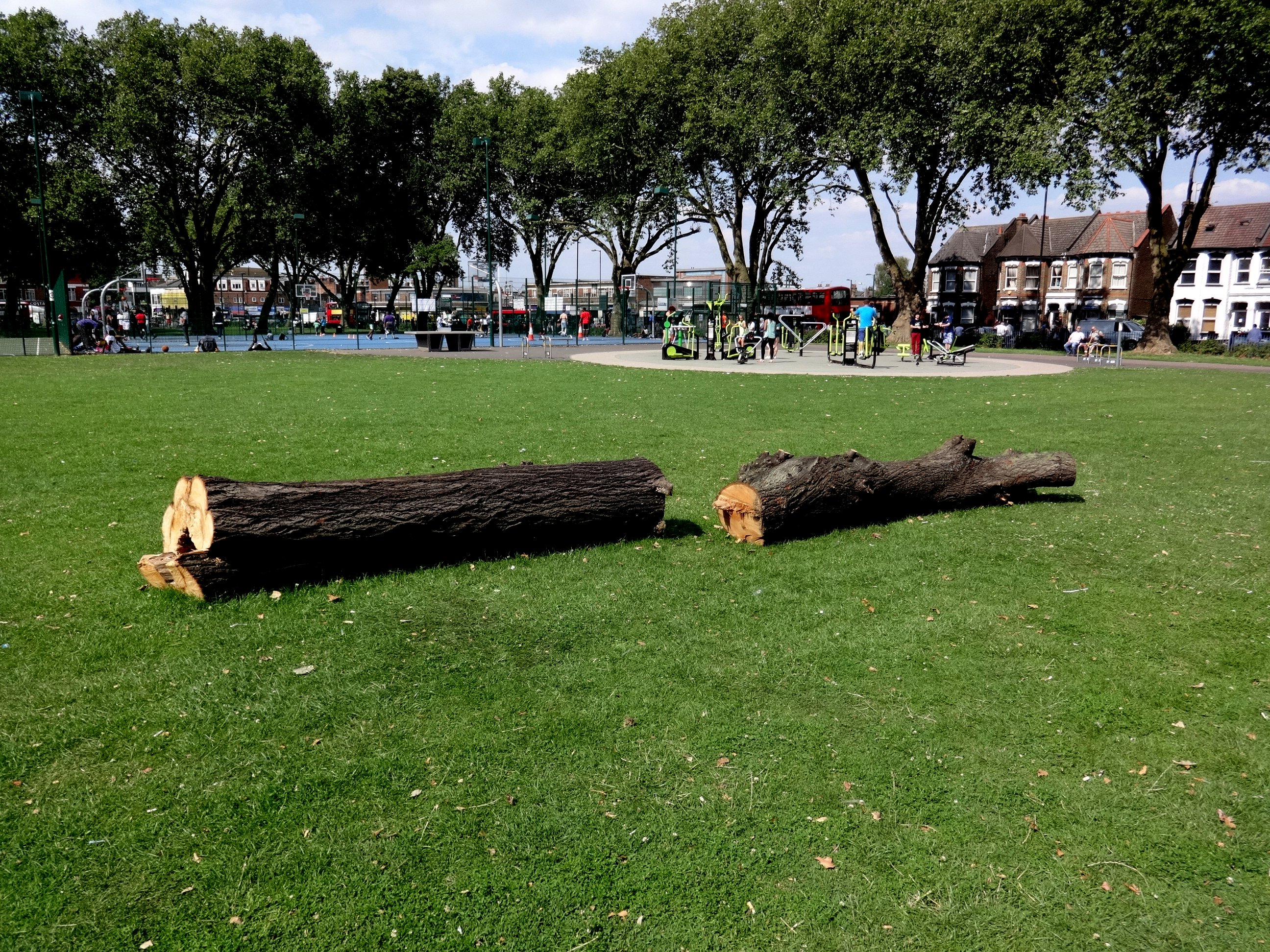
Logs used as seating

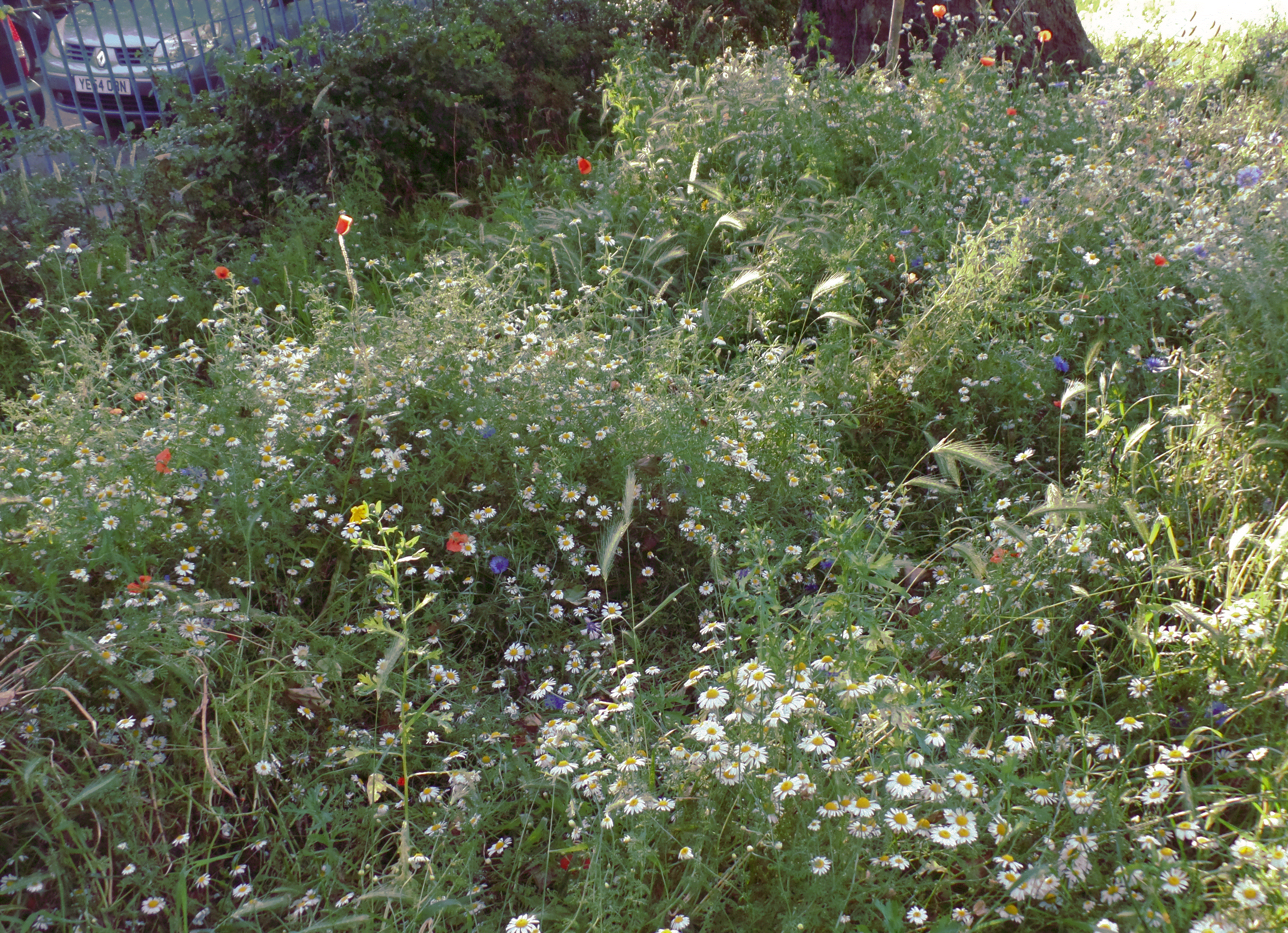
Wildflower Meadow

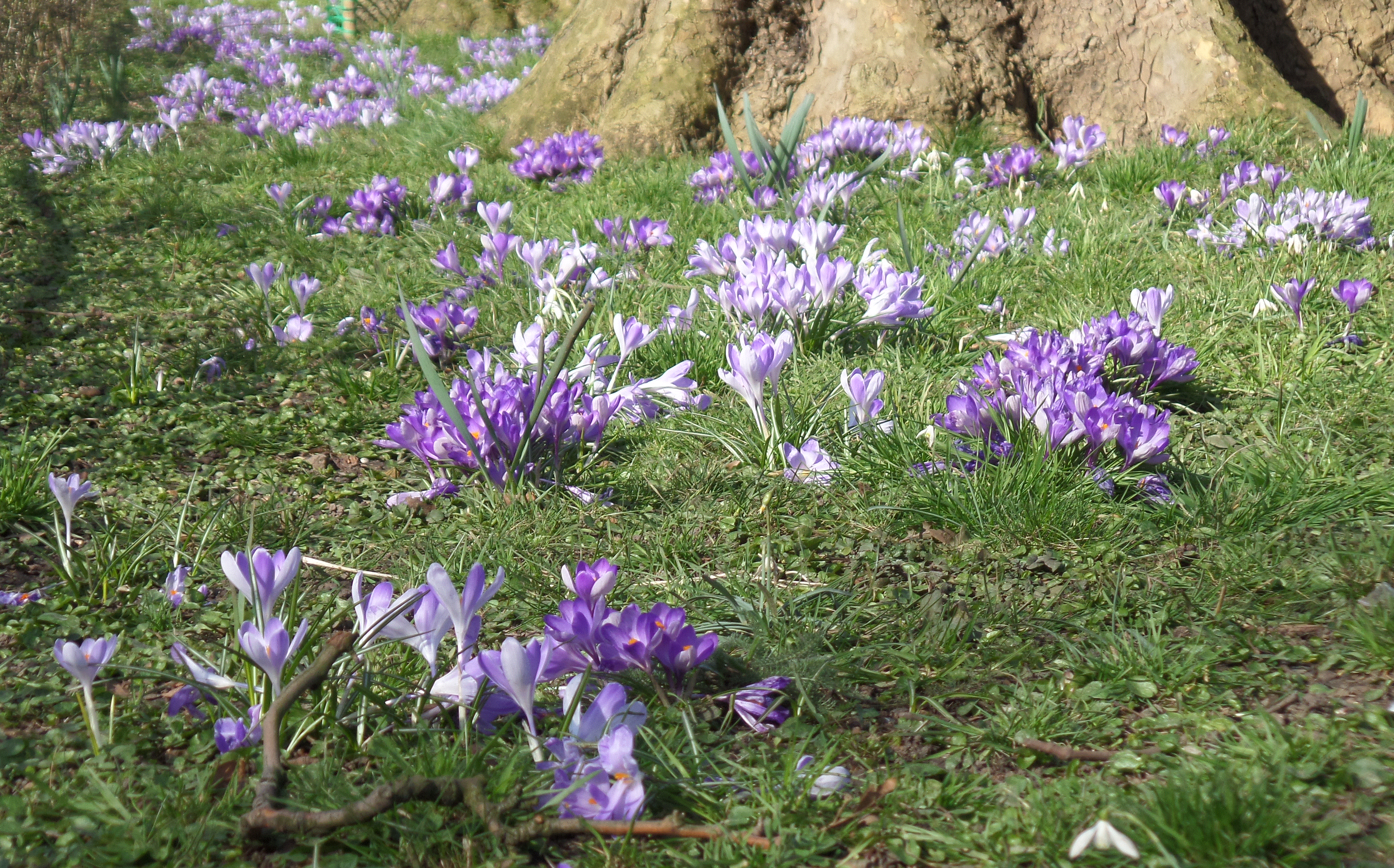
Spring blossoms
