= Turnpike Lane tube station =

London Underground station

Turnpike Lane
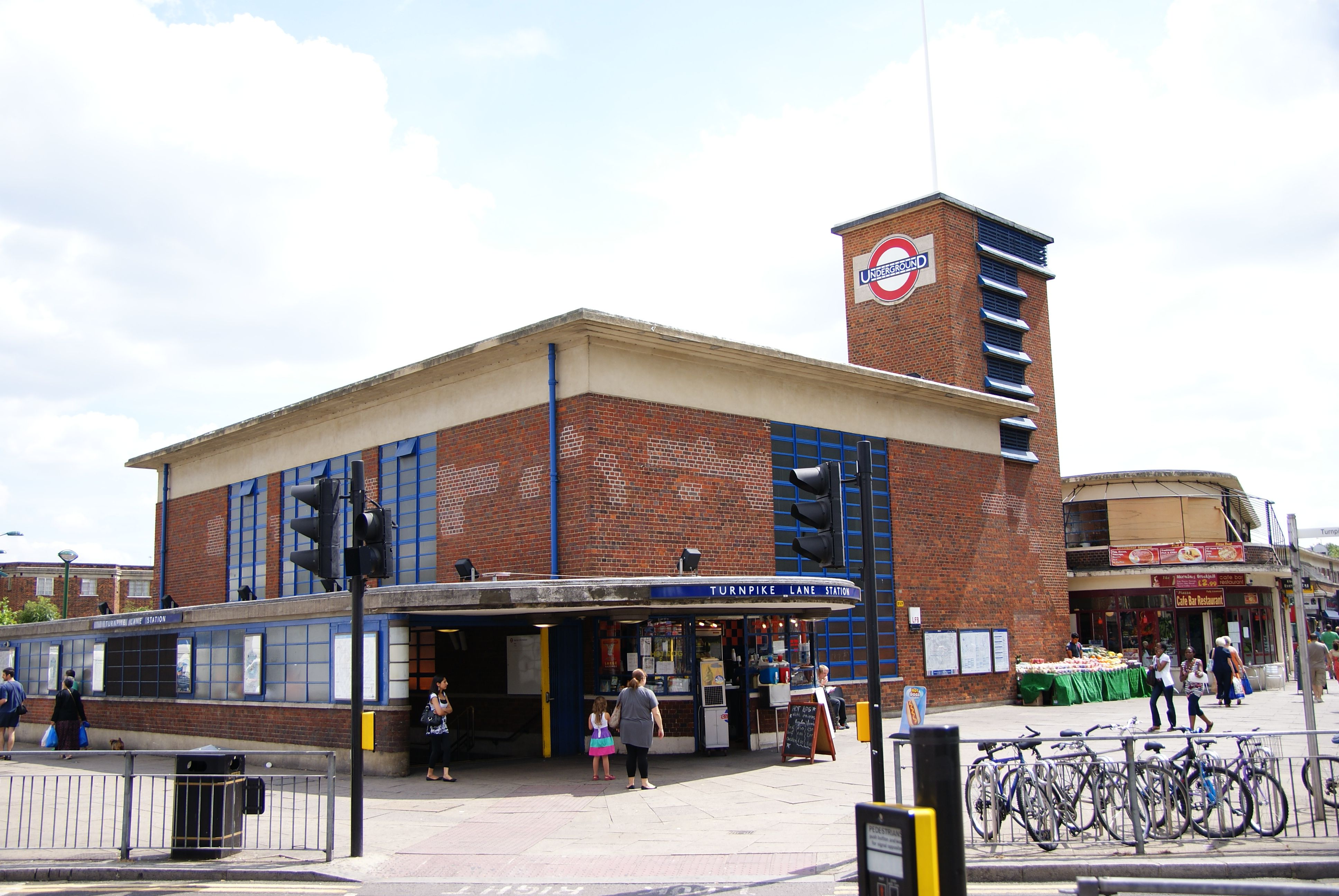
- Station entrance and ticket hall
- Interactive map of Turnpike Lane

General information
- Location: Turnpike Lane, Haringey
- Local authority: London Borough of Haringey
- Managed by: London Underground
- Number of platforms: 2
- Fare zone: 3

London Underground annual entry and exit
- 2021: ▼4.49 million
- 2022: ▲7.89 million
- 2023: ▲7.95 million
- 2024: ▼7.82 million
- 2025: ▼7.48 million

Key dates
- 19 September 1932: Opened

Listed status
- Listing grade: II
- Entry number: 1263624
- Added to list: 17 May 1994

Other information
- External links: TfL station info page
- Coordinates: 51.5904°N 0.1028°W

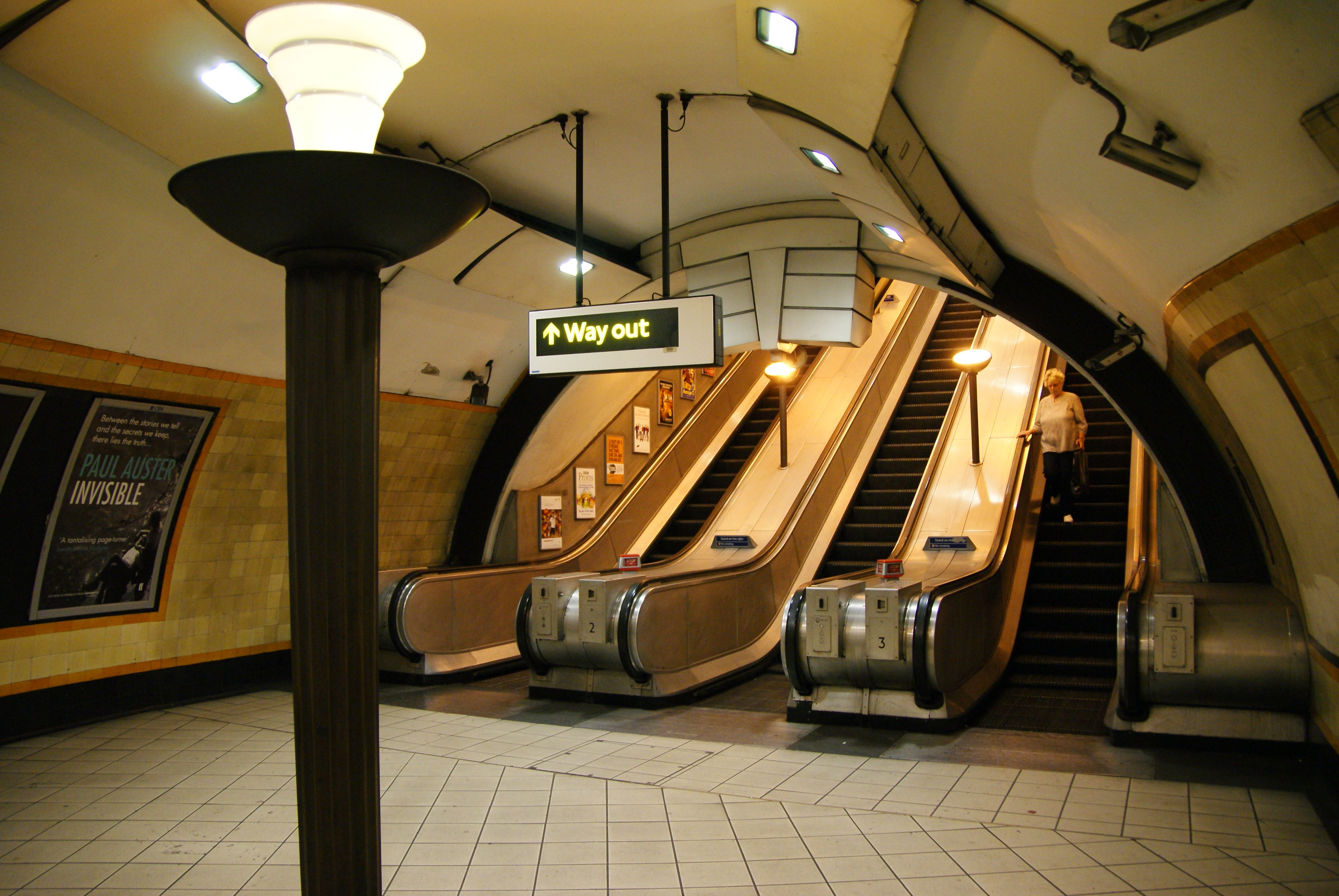
Platform level.

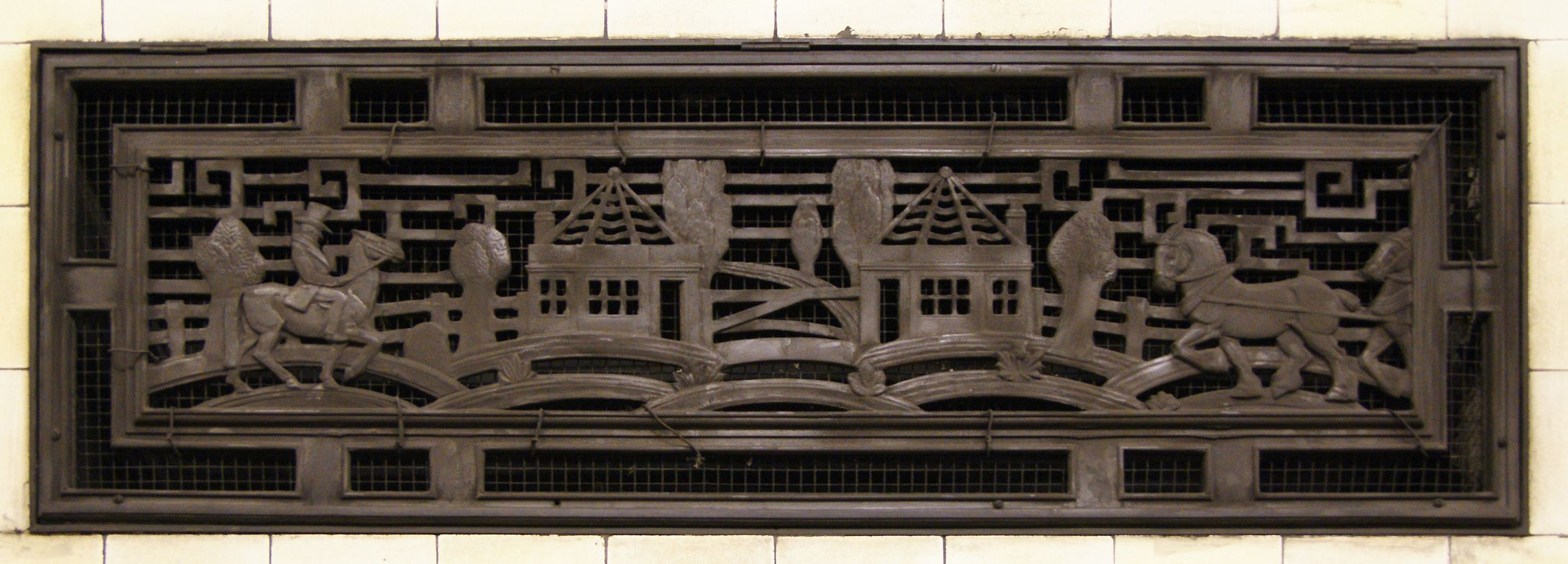
Decorative ventilation grill.

Turnpike Lane is a London Underground station. It is named after Turnpike Lane in the London Borough of Haringey in North London, England. The station is on the Piccadilly line, between Manor House and Wood Green stations. It is in London fare zone 3.

The station was opened on 19 September 1932 as part of the Piccadilly line extension to Cockfosters in North London.

== History ==
The station was opened on 19 September 1932. It was the first Underground station in the Municipal Borough of Tottenham and was located at the meeting point of the boroughs of Tottenham, Hornsey and Wood Green, all now part of the London Borough of Haringey.

Like all stations on the Cockfosters extension, Turnpike Lane set new aesthetic standards not previously seen on the Underground. During the planning period for the extension to Cockfosters, two alternative names for this station, North Harringay and Ducketts Green (Ducketts Common is located opposite) were considered but rejected.

== Design ==
The station was designed by the architect Charles Holden and is a well-preserved example of the modernist house style of London Transport in the 1930s. It was listed at Grade II in 1994. The ticket hall is an enormous brick box, with two large ventilation towers, half-sunk into the surrounding ground. Its high walls contain segmented windows that allow natural light to shine far into the station. The effect in late afternoon light is akin to that in a cathedral transept. Two of the street entrances gave access to the tram routes to and from Alexandra Palace via tramway island exits into Turnpike Lane. The tram services were withdrawn in 1938 and replaced by buses; these continued to use the tram islands until 1968, when they were removed.

The sub-surface areas are tiled with biscuit-coloured tiles lined with yellow friezes. The booking hall is 12 feet (3.7 m) below street level. In common with Manor House and Wood Green, the station tunnels have a diameter of 23 ft (7.0 m) and were designed for the greater volume of traffic expected. Bounds Green and Southgate have only 21-foot (6.4 m) diameter platform tunnels. The construction of "suicide pits" between the rails was also innovative. These were built in connection with a system of passageways under the platforms to give access to the track.

The station originally featured a large 'Underground' sign incorporated into a lamp standard in the space in front of the station, which was part of Holden's original design, but this has since been removed.

== Bus station ==
Turnpike Lane bus station is situated behind the tube station building. It is owned and maintained by London Buses. The bus station is served by the routes which start or terminate at Turnpike Lane bus station; 121, 123, 184, 217, 221, 231, 329, 444, plus route 144.

=== History ===
In the 1920s buses operated from a garage on the adjacent Whymark Avenue until in 1932 Turnpike Lane station was built. It was originally conceived as an integrated bus, train and tram station, with the bus interchange located behind the main building. It was roofed over in the 1960s.

By the 1990s the bus station was deemed too small, both for the number of buses using it and the increasing length of vehicles. A new bus station was thus built which involved demolishing an adjacent cinema to extend the hardstanding.

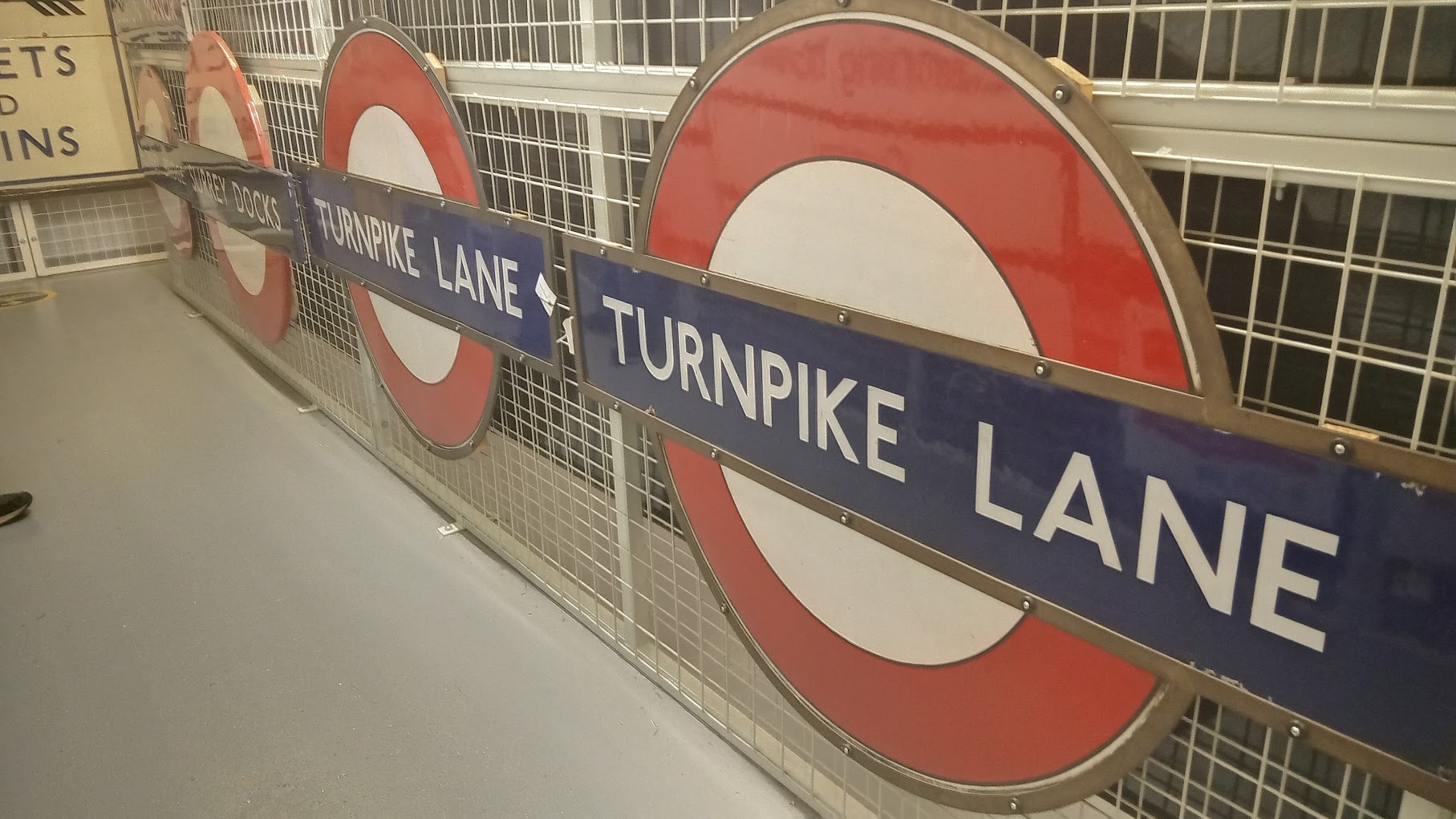
Preserved Turnpike Lane Roundel seen in the London Transport Museum Depot in Acton, London.

== Location ==
It is located on the junction of, and directly serves, Turnpike Lane, Wood Green High Road Wood Green and Green Lanes.

== Connections ==
Day and night-time London Buses routes serve the station.

== Future ==
In May 2013, the government confirmed the station to be on its main consultation route for the Crossrail 2 proposal, to be on the blue-printed New Southgate branch.

== Popular culture ==
The station is mentioned in the song "Junkie Doll" by Mark Knopfler on his album Sailing to Philadelphia, and also in "Los Angeles Waltz" by Razorlight on their self-titled album Razorlight.

| Preceding station | London Underground | Following station |
|---|---|---|
| Manor House towards Uxbridge, Rayners Lane or Heathrow Airport (Terminal 4 or Terminal 5) | Piccadilly line | Wood Green towards Cockfosters or Arnos Grove |
Future Development
| Preceding station | Crossrail | Following station |
| Seven Sisters towards Hampton Court, Shepperton, Chessington South or Epsom | Crossrail 2 | Alexandra Palace towards New Southgate |
