= Stephen Cox (sculptor) =

British sculptor (born 1946)

- Born: 1946 (age 79–80); Bristol, England
- Education: Central School of Art and Design
- Known for: Sculpture
- Website: stephencoxra.com

Stephen Cox RA (born 1946) is a British sculptor, known for his monolithic public artworks in stone.

Cox trained at the Central School of Art and Design, London, from 1966 to 1968. and attended the sixth Indian Triennale in 1986 in New Delhi, to represent the United Kingdom. His style mixes Italian, Egyptian and Indian traditions. He also works in wood, and has exhibited at the Royal Academy.

Cox lives and works in a former farmhouse at Clee Hill, Shropshire, England and has a second home in Mahabalipuram, India, where he also works.

== Works ==
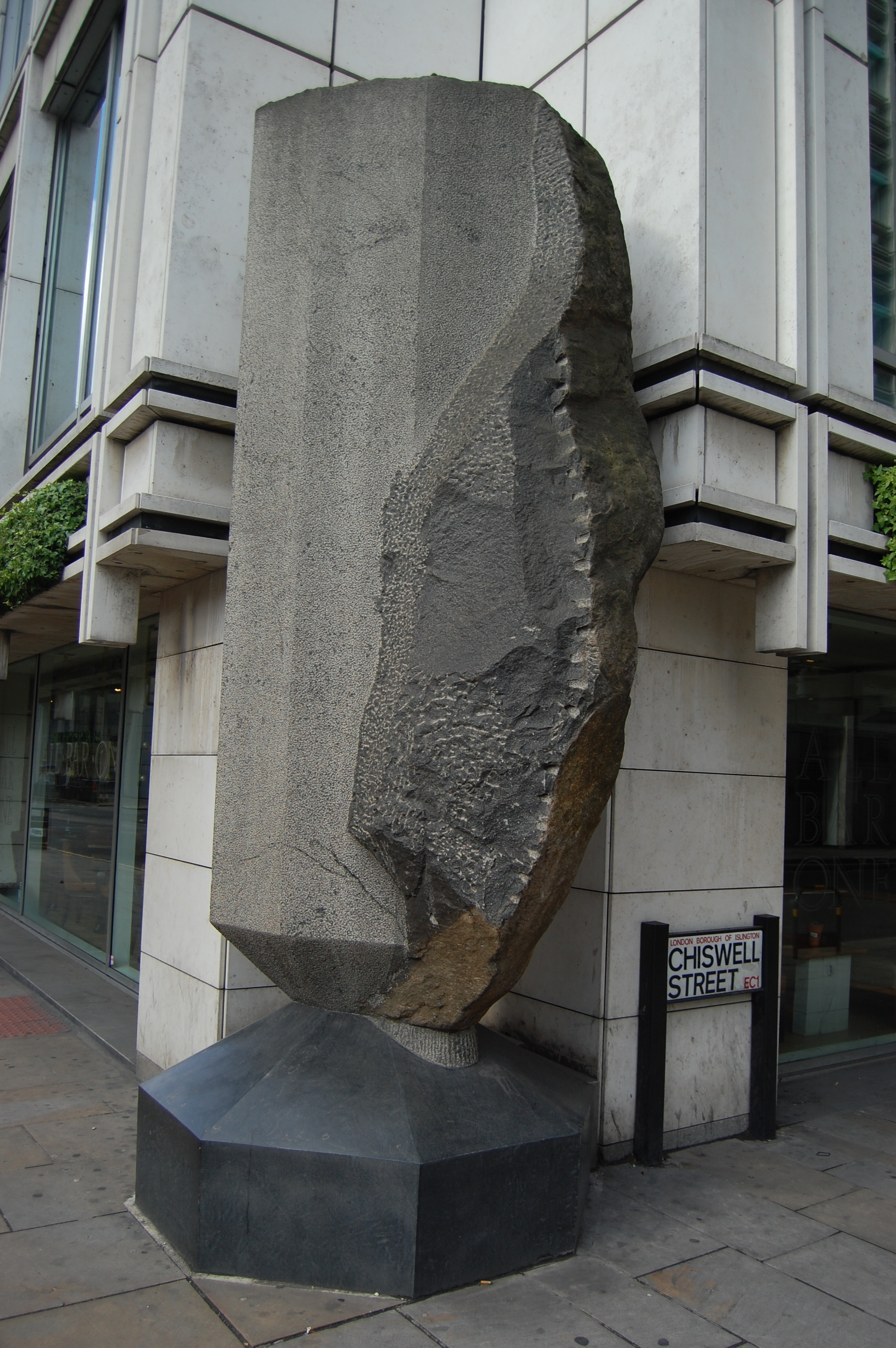
Faceted Column (1999), opposite London's Finsbury Square

Cox's works include:

1984: "Palanzana", Liverpool

- 1986: Atyeo, Bristol
- 1988: Song, Cairo Opera House (imperial porphyry and white diorite stone)
- 1990: Hymn, University of Kent
- 1991: Osirisisis, Stockley Park business park, near Heathrow Airport (diorite stone)
- 1992: Mantra, British High Commission, New Delhi
- 1993: Reredos: Christ the Saviour of the World, altar and font, St Paul's Church, Harringay, London
- 1993: Mago, Fattoria di Celle – Collezione Gori, Pistoia, Italy
- 1993: Echo, Broadgate Properties, Fleet Place, Ludgate, London
- 1996: Tribute Sculpture, British High Commission, Canberra (war memorial)
- 1997: Vessels: Adam and Eve, St Luke's Church, Chelsea, London
- 1997: Eucharist, Cathedral of St Nicholas, Newcastle Upon Tyne
- 1998: Rajiv Gandhi Samadhi, Vir Bhumi, Raj Ghat, New Delhi
- 1999: Faceted Column, Finsbury Pavement, London (sandstone, pictured)
- 1999: Tribute to Beato Surore, Hospital of Santa Maria della Scala, Siena, Italy
- 2001: Proslogion: to St. Anselm, Aosta Cathedral, Italy
- 2005: Altar to St. Anselm, St. Anselm's Chapel, Canterbury Cathedral
- 2009 Virgin Mary and Saint Midred: Tower Gateway of Lincoln College, Oxford
- 2011: Holy Water Stoup, Canterbury Cathedral
- 2015: Memorial to Edwin Lutyens and Figure Emerging, Mayfair, London
