= St Paul's Church, Harringay =

St Paul's, Harringay
- Parish Church of St Paul the Apostle
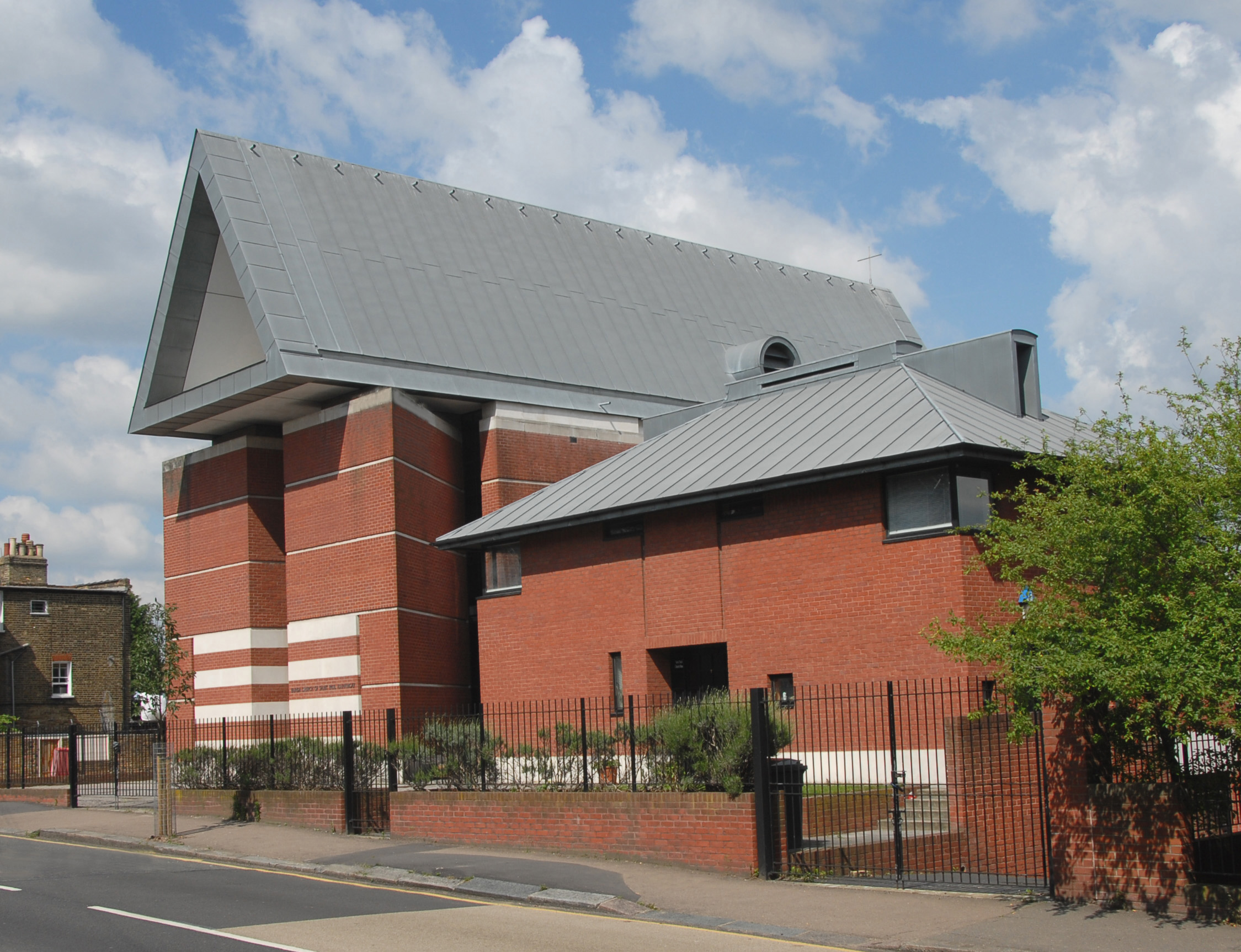
- St Paul's Church, Harringay, as seen in June 2007

- 51.5784°N 0.1039°W
- Location: Wightman Road, London, N4
- Country: England
- Denomination: Church of England
- Tradition: Anglican
- Website: Official website

History
- Founded: 28 June 1892
- Dedicated: 1883 & rededicated 1993

Architecture
- Architect(s): Peter Inskip and Peter Jenkins
- Style: A modern interpretation of a classical Greek megaron
- Years built: 1882–83 & c. 1990–93

Administration
- Province: Canterbury
- Diocese: Diocese of London
- Archdeaconry: Hampstead
- Deanery: East Haringey
- Parish: Harringay

Clergy
- Vicar: Rev Pete Snow (Priest in Charge)

The Church of St Paul the Apostle, Wightman Road, Harringay, London, N4, serves the parish of Harringay in north London. In ecclesiastical terms the parish is part of the Edmonton Episcopal Area of the Diocese of London. In political terms the parish is in the London Borough of Haringey.

In 1984 the nineteenth-century church building was destroyed by fire, and the present iconic building was opened in 1993, designed by London architects Peter Inskip and Peter Jenkins.

In September 2018, the church was revitalised with the support of Christ Church Mayfair. There are two services on Sundays: Holy Communion at 9:30am and an Informal service at 11:00am.

The parish of Harringay is situated at one corner of what was formerly part of Hornsey parish, adjacent to Stoke Newington parish.

== 1883: the first parish church ==
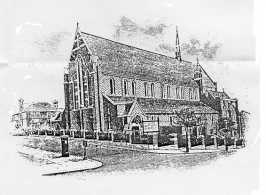
St. Paul's church in c. 1930.

In 1883, the Reverend Joshua Greaves was appointed vicar, and found at Harringay a fast-growing housing estate rapidly covering open spaces and fields, but no church building. A temporary tin hut mission church was opened for worship on 23 December when there were six communicants and a collection of 14s 3d. The temporary church stood in Burgoyne Road.

The digging of the ground preparatory to building the first permanent church began on Tuesday, 20 May 1890, and the foundation stone was laid by Lady Louisa Wolseley (1843–1920) on Saturday, 31 May 1890. The church was consecrated on 1 October 1891 by Dr. Frederick Temple, the Bishop of London.

On 28 June 1892 the ecclesiastical Parish of St. Paul's Harringay was formed out of Holy Trinity Stroud Green, St. Anne's Stamford Hill, and St. Mary's Hornsey. The living was £387 net per year, with benefice.

=== The building described ===
The new church was designed by the London architect George Michael Silley (born 1834), and was built of red brick with Carsham-stone dressing, topped with a flèche. The building was in the style of 13th-century English Gothic architecture. It was constructed of Peterborough red brick with Bracknell stone dressings, with a chancel, south-east chapel and bell-cot, north vestries, and an aisled and clerestoried nave of six bays with north-west and south-west porches. When built the church seated 700. (NB The chancel and Lady Chapel, both in a later Decorated English Gothic style, were not completed until 1903).

At the entrance to the chancel was an open, oak screen, and in the chancel itself were the choir stalls arranged collegiate fashion, leading up to an altar. A magnificent organ was made by J. W. Walker & Sons Ltd, and was latterly maintained by Hill, Norman and Beard Ltd., of Hornsey. The church's stained glass windows were designed by John Byam Liston Shaw (1872–1919).

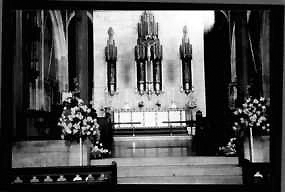
The chancel before its destruction by fire in 1984

The total length of nave and chancel when completed was 130 feet (39.6 m); the width was 28 feet (8.5 m). The height from floor level was 37 feet (11.3 m). The building held 900 people.

A church hall was built in Cavendish Road, N4, and in 1903 a new vicarage was built next to the church.

Joshua Greaves remained the Vicar for 40 years, until 1923. The incumbents succeeding him were, in chronological order: Appleton, Warren, Brassel, Cowen, Bond, Barraclough, Lloyd, Seeley, and Martin.

In 1932 were installed a new marble altar, marble font, and marble reredos with a statue of Christ and other stone figures, all designed by Nugent Cachemaille Day (1896–1976). (The font was a war memorial to the fallen of the 1914–1918 war).

On 7 March 1983, the church's roof caught fire, caused by workmen then repairing a hole in the roof. The fire spread, and the church was destroyed.

== 1993: the current building ==
The interior of the church has been described as evoking "a numinous presence".

In furnishing the new church there has been a significant investment in late twentieth-century British artworks, with the commissioning of pieces from four British artists who were working at the time of the building's creation, namely: the sculptors Danny Clahane, Stephen Cox, and Anton Wagner, and the furniture maker John Makepeace.

Cox has provided the great shield-shaped reredos on the east wall, made from enamelled metal and stone; the monumental altar table, and font (each made from Egyptian Imperial porphyry); and several porphyry candle holders, from the same source. Some of these are used on the altar, while others stand next to each of the three statues contained in the church.

The simple and restrained stone statues of St. Paul and of St. Anthony are by Danny Clahane, while the traditional Walsingham-style, painted wooden figure of the Virgin Mary is by Anton Wagner.

John Makepeace has contributed a one-metre-high alms box, carved from a single piece of solid oak with distinctive deep-ridged ziggurat patterns on all four sides.

The mechanical-action organ was designed and built by Richard Bower, to fit within the organ case designed by the church's architects.

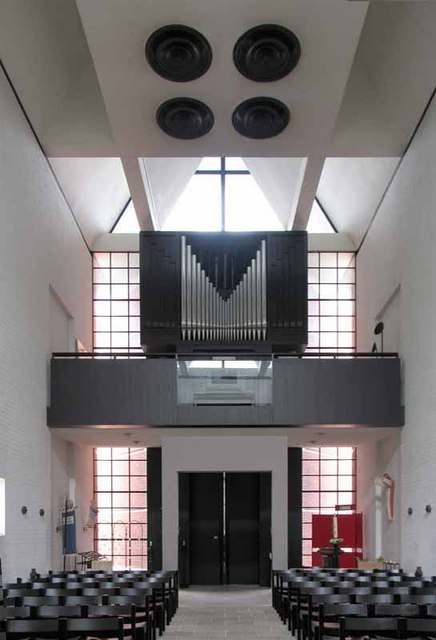
Interior of the new church, looking west.

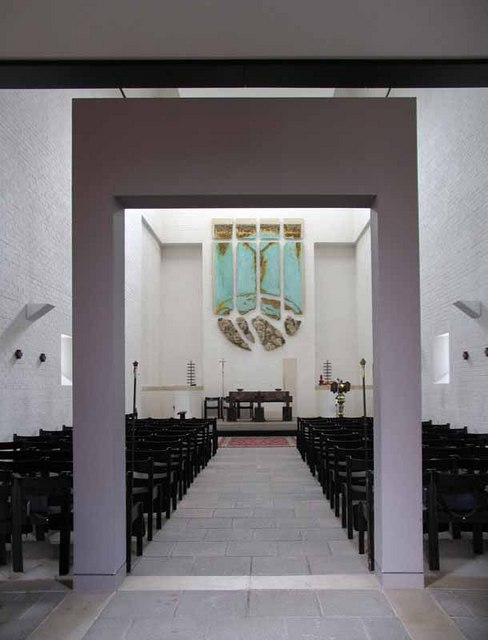
Interior of the new church, looking east.

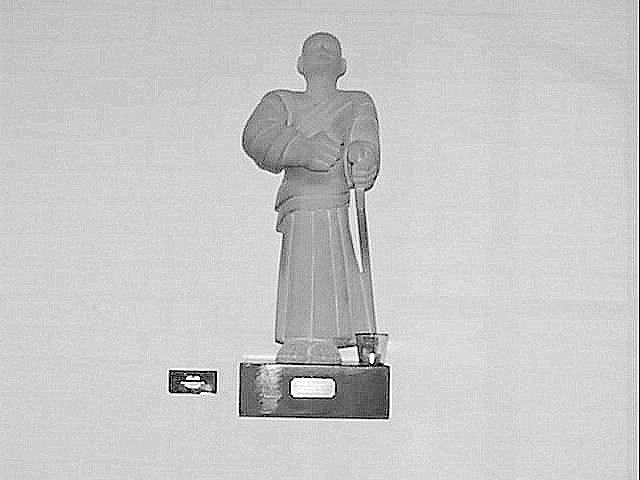
Statue of St. Paul, by Danny Clahane (carved stone, c. 1994).

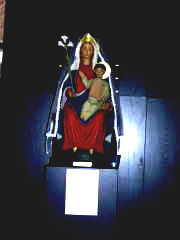
Statue of the Blessed Virgin Mary, by Anton Wagner (carved and painted wood, c. 1994).
