= Turnpike Lane, Haringey =

Street in Haringey, north London

Coordinates: 51.58960°N 0.10639°W

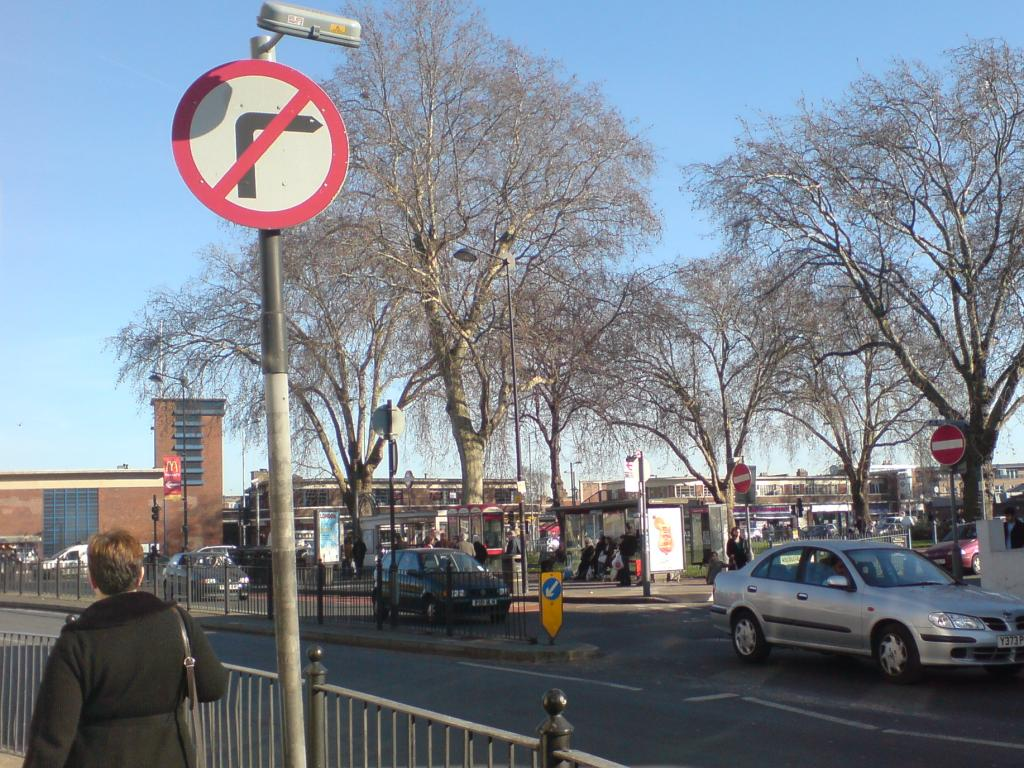
Turnpike Lane, looking south-east towards Ducketts Common

Turnpike Lane is a street in Haringey, north London.

== Description ==
Turnpike Lane forms part of the A504 route, running roughly east–west for less than one mile.

The road is characterised by independent retailers with flats above the shops. It is also a local transport hub: Turnpike Lane Underground station and Turnpike Lane bus station are both situated near the eastern end of the street.

A small park named Ducketts Common is situated at the eastern end of the road, opposite the Underground and bus stations. It was once an area of common land where people had the right to graze their animals.

Turnpike Lane is a busy cosmopolitan shopping street and an important traffic thoroughfare. Speciality shops remain open until late at night, and there are a number of restaurants.

The name Turnpike Lane is also used to refer more generally to the area at the southern end of Wood Green High Road and its surroundings.

== Nearby places ==
- Crouch End
- Harringay
- Hornsey
- West Green
- Wood Green

== Popular culture ==
- The Bus Driver's Prayer
- Razorlight's song "Los Angeles Waltz"
