= Green Lanes (London) =

Road in London

Coordinates: 51.5835°N 0.0999°W

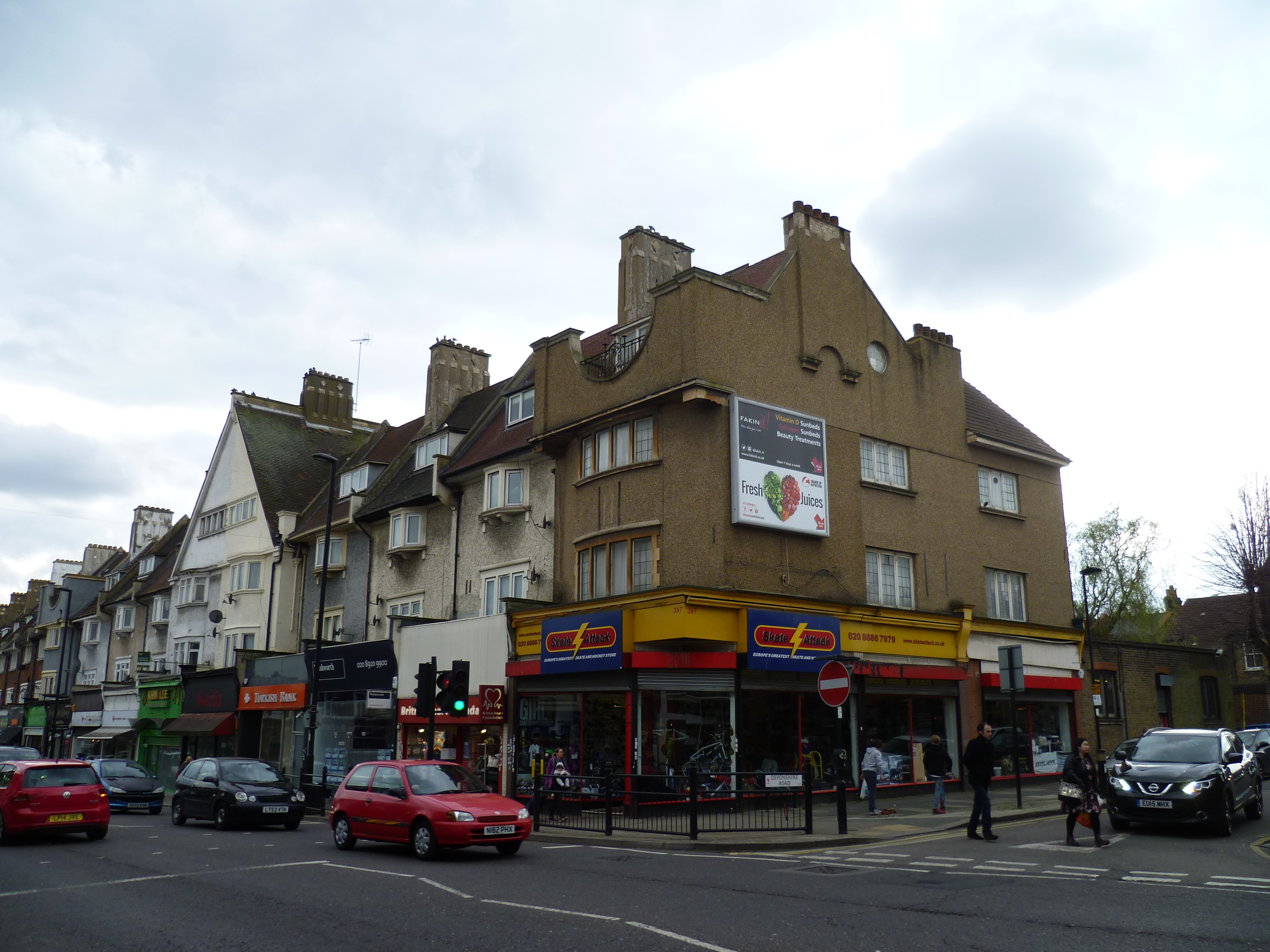
Green Lanes in Palmers Green.

Green Lanes is a main road in North London which forms part of the A105 road. Covering a distance of 6.3 miles (10.1 km) between Newington Green and Winchmore Hill, it is one of the longest streets in the capital, passing through the N16, N4, N8, N13 and N21 postcode areas.

== History ==
Whilst it is undeniably an ancient thoroughfare, the age and origin of Green Lanes is somewhat uncertain. It possibly originated as a drovers' road along which cattle were walked from Hertfordshire to London. Its origins may date back as far as the Roman period.

== Route ==
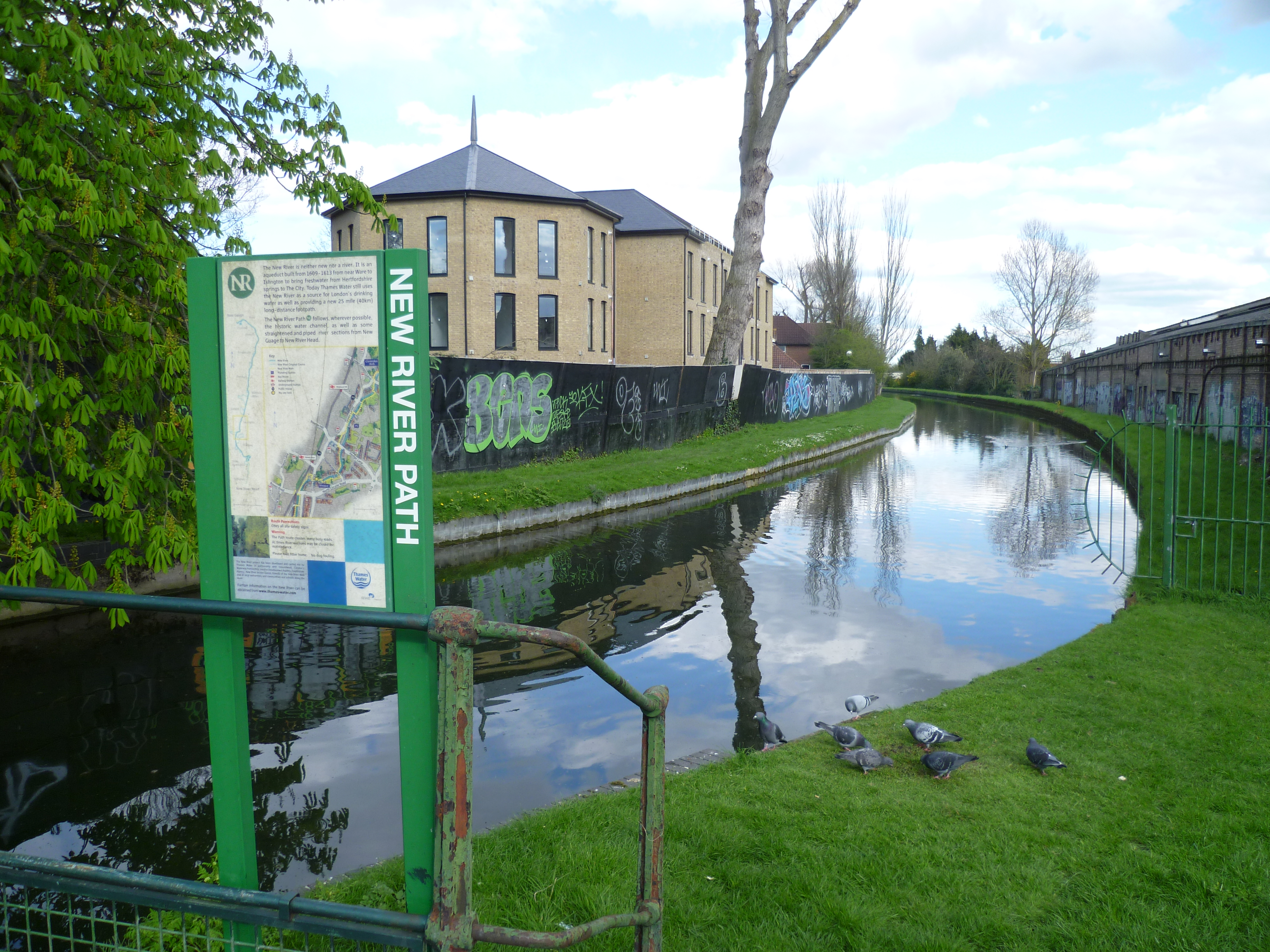
The New River flows under Green Lanes at Palmers Green, here shown looking east.

Green Lanes runs from Newington Green north along the western edge of Stoke Newington, thereby forming the border between Hackney and Islington, until it reaches Manor House at the eastern edge of Finsbury Park. As it crosses the New River over Green Lanes Bridge, it enters the London Borough of Haringey, it then runs 1.4 miles (2.3 km) through the neighbourhood of Harringay. From the junction with Turnpike Lane the road temporarily changes its name and runs for 1.3 miles (2.1 km) through Wood Green as 'High Road', resuming its Green Lanes identity again after the junction with Lascotts Road. It then continues north for another 2.2 miles (3.5 km) through Palmers Green and Winchmore Hill in the London Borough of Enfield, until it reaches the junction with Ridge Avenue and Green Dragon Lane at Mason's Corner. The northward continuation into Bush Hill at this point is now blocked.

Continuous segregated cycle lanes run north from the A406 North Circular to the end of Green Lanes and on to Enfield Town. These were installed following a successful bid by Enfield Council for Mini-Hollands funding from Transport for London.

== Demography ==
See:

- Demographics in Stoke Newington
- Demographics in Harringay
- Demographics in Wood Green
- Demographics in Palmers Green
- Demographics in Winchmore Hill

== Neighbourhoods ==
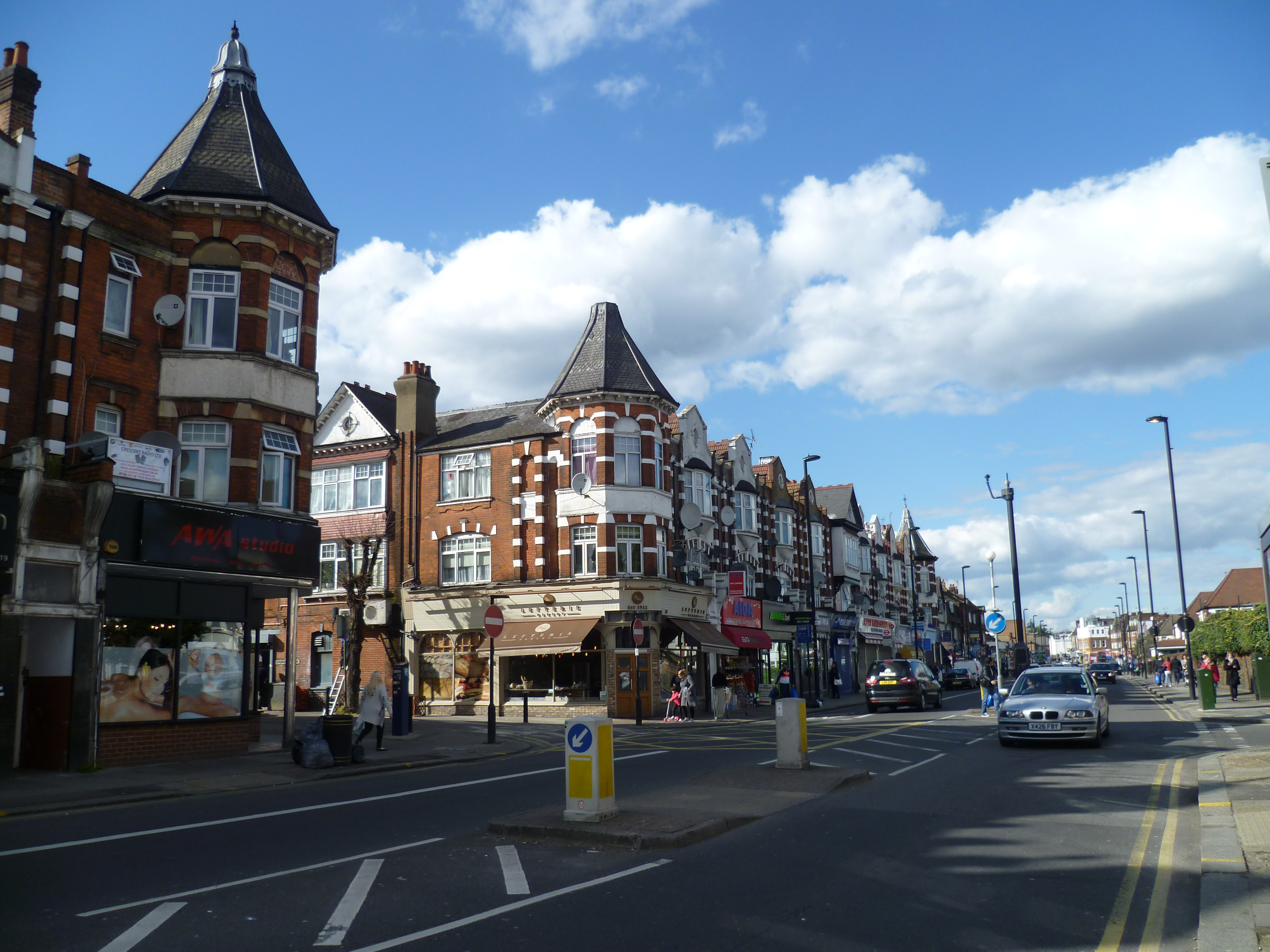
Where Green Lanes temporarily becomes Wood Green High Road

Neighbourhoods sited on Green Lanes, from South to North:

- Newington Green
- Stoke Newington
- Manor House
- Harringay (including Finsbury Park)
- Duckett's Green
- Wood Green
- Palmers Green
- Winchmore Hill

== Notable locations ==
- Castle Climbing Centre
