= Municipal Borough of Tottenham =

Former administrative district in England

Coordinates: 51.592°N 0.072°W

Tottenham
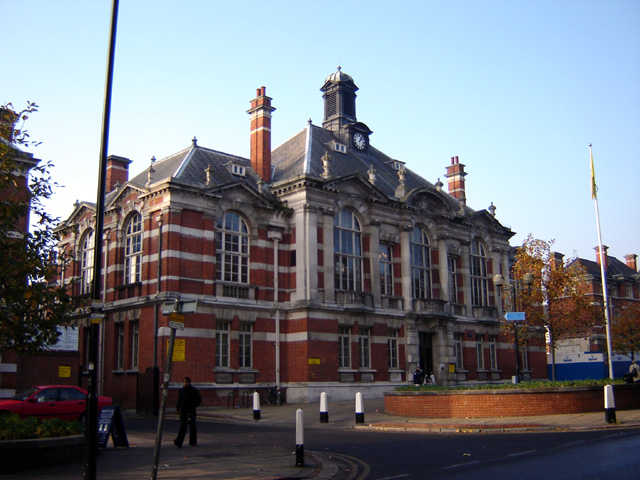
- Tottenham Town Hall

- Tottenham within Middlesex in 1961
- Area
  - 1894: 3,014 acres (12.2 km^{2})
  - 1965: 3,012 acres (12.2 km^{2})
- Population
  - 1901: 102,703
  - 1961: 113,249
- History
  - Created: 1850
  - Abolished: 1965
  - Succeeded by: London Borough of Haringey
- Status: Local board (1850 – 1894); Urban district (1894 – 1934); Municipal borough (after 1934)
- Government
  - HQ: Tottenham
  - Motto: Do well and doubt not

Tottenham (/ˈtɒtənəm/ TOT-ən-əm) was a local government district in north east Middlesex from 1850 to 1965. It was part of the London postal district and Metropolitan Police District.

== History ==
In 1850 a local board of health was established for the civil parish of Tottenham and in 1875 the local board became an urban sanitary authority, without change of name. The ancient parish had included Wood Green and in 1888 the district was divided, with Wood Green gaining its own local board.

The sanitary district was reconstituted as an urban district in 1894 under the Local Government Act 1894 and Wood Green was removed from the parish. In 1934 the urban district was incorporated as a municipal borough. In 1965, the municipal borough was abolished and its former area transferred to Greater London under the London Government Act 1963 to be combined with that of other districts to form the present-day London Borough of Haringey.

== Coat of arms ==
Tottenham was granted a coat of arms on 13 September 1934. The arms was: "Gules a saltire couped or on a chief indented of the last a helm sable between two billets azure each charged with an estoile of the second." The crest was: "Issuant from a mural crown or a demi-lion gules supporting a seax (sword) argent pomelled and hilted or". The supporters were: "On either side a lion reguardant gules gorged with a mural crown pendant therefrom by a chain or a roundel; the dexter ermine and the sinister or, charged with a maunch also gules. The motto was "Do well and doubt not".
