= Kenrick =

Kenrick is a northern European surname.

The surname Kenrick was first found in Denbighshire, Wales, where they held a family seat as Lords of the Manor of Nantclwyd Woore. (The estates included Woore, Shropshire, Cerniogau and Nantclwyd.)

The name appears as Kenricus and Kenric in the Domesday Book in 1086. "The family of Kenrick of Nantclwyd Woore, co Denbigh, claim from David Kenrick who fought under the Black Prince at Creci and Poictiers."

== Etymology and history ==
Kenrick has a number of possible etymologies with various derivations, depending on the country of origin.

The Welsh personal name "Cyn(w)rig" or "Cynfrig" derived from the elements "cyn," a chief, and "(g)wr," a man, plus the suffix of quality "ig". In Scotland the surname originated from Machendrie or Mackendrick, which are Highland border names meaning "son of Henry". In Ireland, the surname is a variant of Enright, an Anglicized form of the Gaelic byname "Indreachtach," attacker. One, John Kerrych, is noted in the Calendar of Inquisitiones Post Mortem, Suffolk (1297). In England it derived from the Middle English given name "Cenric" or "Kendrich", from the Old English pre-7th century "Cyneric", composed of the elements "cyne," royal, and "ric," power.

The Kenricks of east Denbighshire and the border trace their descent to Cynwrig ap Rhiwallon (died 1074), who claimed the lordship of Bromfield (Maelor Gymraeg) after the Welsh reconquest of the 11th century, and from whom the township of Cristionydd Kenrick (near Ruabon) is believed to take its name.

In the modern idiom, the surname has numerous variant spellings including Kenrick, Kenwrick, Kerrich, Kerrage, and Kerrick.

== List ==
Notable people bearing the name include:

- Ann Kenrick (born 1958), British charity worker
- Bruce Kenrick (1920–2007), minister in the United Reformed Church and the Church of Scotland
- Daniel Kenrick (fl.1685), English physician and poet
- David Kenrick, of Denbighshire
- Douglas T. Kenrick (born 1948), American psychologist
- Francis Kenrick (1796–1863), Catholic bishop of Philadelphia and Archbishop of Baltimore
- George Hamilton Kenrick, (1850–1939), English entomologist
- Jane Kenrick (1946–1988), British academic
- Jarvis Kenrick (1852–1949), English footballer
- John Kenrick, who landed in Boston, Massachusetts in 1639
- John Kendrick (American sea captain) (c.1740–1794)
- John Kenrick (MP) (1735–1799), MP for Bletchingley
- John Kenrick (historian) (1788–1877), 19th century classical historian
- John Kenrick (theatre writer) (b. 1959), American theatre and film historian and writer
- Llewelyn Kenrick (1847–1933), Welsh lawyer and footballer
- Peter Richard Kenrick (1806–1896), Irish-born American Catholic archbishop
- Richard Kenrick (1725–1802), of Nantclwyd and Woore, Wales
- Scawen Kenrick (1694–1753), English cleric
- Timothy Kenrick (1759–1804), Welsh Unitarian minister, biblical commentator and dissenting academy tutor
- Tony Kenrick (born 1935), Australian-American novelist
- Wilfred Byng Kenrick (1872–1962), Lord Mayor of Birmingham, son of William Kenrick (Birmingham MP):
- William Kenrick (Member of Barebone's Parliament), (fl. 1653), MP for Kent (UK Parliament constituency)
- William Kenrick (Birmingham MP) (1831–1919), English iron founder, hardware manufacturer and Liberal politician (cousin of Llewelyn)
- William Kenrick (1774–1829), English MP for Bletchingley 1806–14, Master of the King's Household 1810–12
- William Kenrick (nurseryman) (1795–1872), American nurseryman
- William Kenrick (writer) (c.1725–1779), English novelist, playwright, translator and satirist

== See also ==
- Kendrick (disambiguation)
- Kenrick Edisbury, MP
