= Ann Kenrick =

Ann Kenrick (born 13 January 1958) is a charity leader in the United Kingdom.

== Early life and family ==
Ann Kenrick is the second of four children of the pastor and homelessness campaigner, Rev Dr Bruce Kenrick, and his wife Isabel. Ann was born in the mission at Ranaghat, near Kolkata, India known as Doyabari when her father was working there as a missionary. When he was invalided back to the UK, the family moved to the Scottish island of Iona. They later settled in Notting Hill, London, at which time Bruce Kenrick founded the Notting Hill Housing Trust and the charity Shelter. Dr Isabel Kenrick, from Boston, Massachusetts, was a historian who worked for the Historical Manuscripts Commission.

== Career ==
Kenrick worked as Secretary-General (CEO) of the diplomatic third-sector organisation, the Franco-British Council (FBC), a role in which she served for 21 years. From 2016 to 2017 she led the FBC’s Young Leaders programme.

In February 2017, Kenrick was appointed the first female Master and CEO of the 17th-century charity and almshouse, the London Charterhouse. During her tenure, Kenrick invited the first women to join the community as "brothers" and appointed its first woman Canon. She also opened the Charterhouse to the public to raise much-needed maintenance funds and oversaw a meticulous restoration of the Great Chamber, the only Tudor hall to survive in Greater London. She chose to step down after a five-year term in April 2022. In August 2022 she was appointed a trustee of the Barbican Centre trust.

=== Voluntary work ===
Kenrick founded the Dulwich Safe Routes to School Group. She served for many years as a trustee of the Environmental Transport Association. An avid cyclist, she has been an advocate and activist and was a long-serving trustee of the London Cycling Campaign, elected chair in 2012, and serving for six years. She led several protests against the deaths of cyclists in London.

== Honours ==
In 2009 New Year Honours, Kenrick was appointed OBE for services to Franco-British relations. In 2015, she became the sixth Briton to be awarded the National Order of Merit by the French government. In 2018, she was one of the "remarkable women who have shaped contemporary British society" selected by the Foundling Museum for its "First Amongst Equals" exhibition. In 2021 she was awarded the Freedom of the City of London.

== Publications ==
- Let me Out! How to enjoy the school run (Lollypop Publishing, 2009)
