= Skyline (London) =

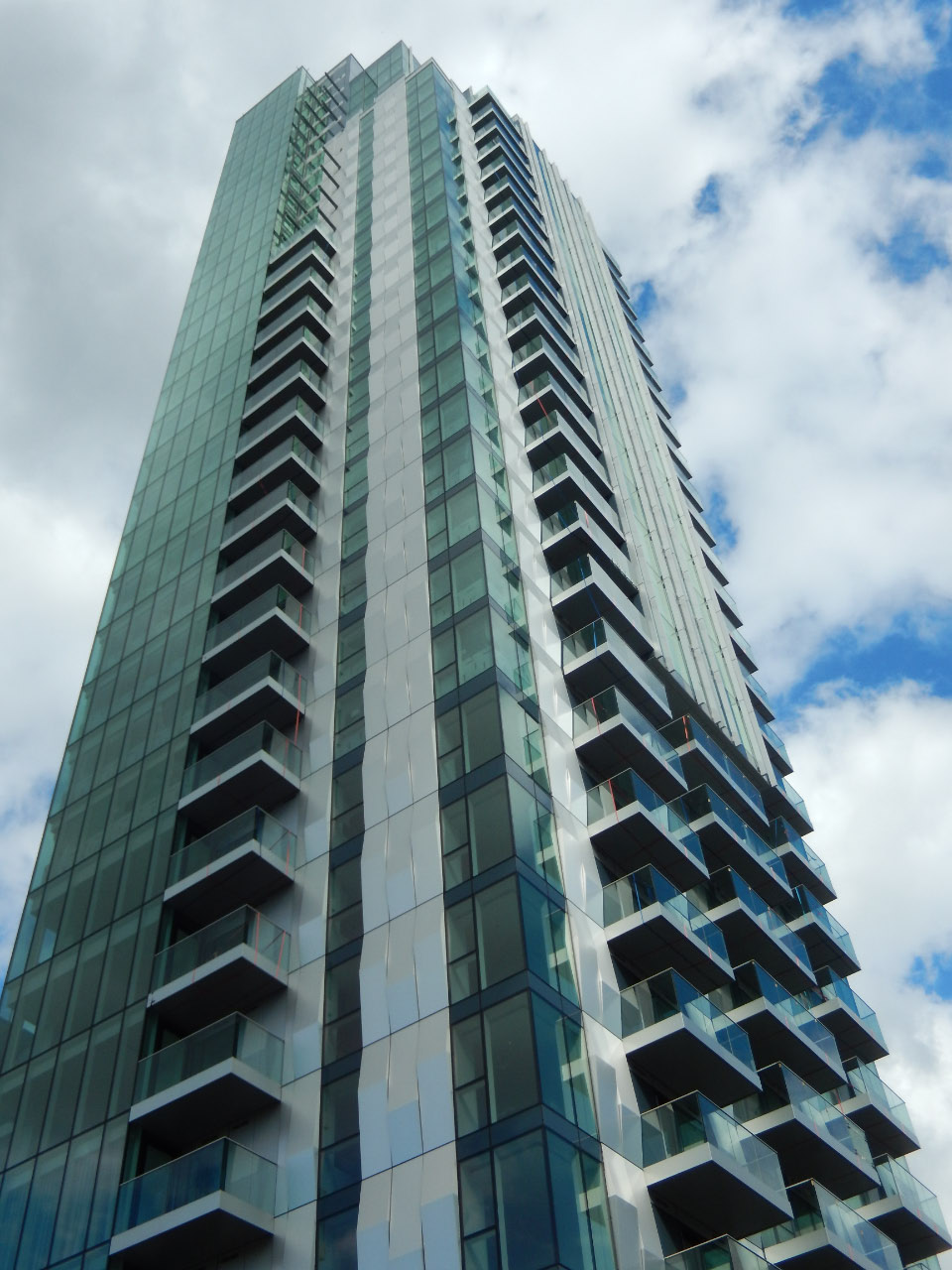
- Interactive map of the Skyline area

General information
- Status: Completed
- Type: Residential
- Location: Woodberry Grove, London, N4; United Kingdom
- Coordinates: 51.5717364°N 0.0895392°W
- Construction started: 2013
- Completed: 2016
- Operator: Rendall & Rittner

Height
- Roof: 101 m (331 ft)

Technical details
- Floor count: 31
- Lifts/elevators: 3

Design and construction
- Architect: Rolfe Judd Limited
- Developer: Berkeley Homes

The Skyline, officially Woodberry Down-Skyline, is a residential building located in Woodberry Down, London. It is the tallest residential tower block in North London and a landmark of the Stoke Newington skyline.

Development began in 2011 and ended in 2017. It was constructed by Berkeley Homes as a part of the larger Woodberry Down Restoration program, and was designed by architecture firm Rolfe Judd.

The regeneration scheme involved delivering over 5,500 new homes and represented an investment of c. £1bn. The regeneration started in 2004 when the Hackney Council adopted an outline masterplan and is due to complete in 2035 (31 years later).

The scheme won the Project of the Year award in 2018 from the Royal Institution of Chartered Surveyors (RICS).

The Skyline is the tallest building at the centre of Woodberry Down. There are 139 apartments in the building and 31 floors with total 101 meters in height. The tower includes a resident-only gym, 15-meter swimming pool and spa facilities and a Sainsbury's Local supermarket.

It is located to the east of Finsbury Park and Manor House station and on the north side of Woodberry Down Reservoirs, which consist in the West reservoir dedicated to sailing and the East reservoir dedicated to a nature reserve known as Woodberry Wetlands.
