= Kindrick =

Kindrick may refer to:

== People ==
- Joel Kindrick, co-founder of the Drama Arts Society at Pacific Union College
- Kim Kindrick, actor in the 2006 film The Cutting Edge: Going for the Gold
- Kindrick Carter, competed at the 2016 Winter Youth Olympics for United States
- Sophia Kindrick Alcorn (1883–1967), American educator
- William D. Kindrick, American political candidate; see 1844 and 1845 United States House of Representatives elections
- Will Kindrick, American filmmaker

== Other ==
- Dep. Chief Diane Kindrick, a character in an episode of Stalker played by Lee Garlington
- Kindrick Legion Field, a baseball field in Montana

== See also ==
- Bill Kindricks (1946–2015), American football player
- Kindricks Bay, Southeast Alaska; see List of shipwrecks in 1958
- Kendrick (disambiguation)
