= Shelter (charity) =

Homelessness charity in England and Scotland

Shelter, the National Campaign for Homeless People Limited
- Founded: 1 December 1966
- Founder: Bruce Kenrick
- Type: Not-for-profit
- Purpose: Housing and homelessness
- Location: London, UK
- Region served: England and Scotland
- Revenue: £81,331,000
- Website: shelter.org.uk

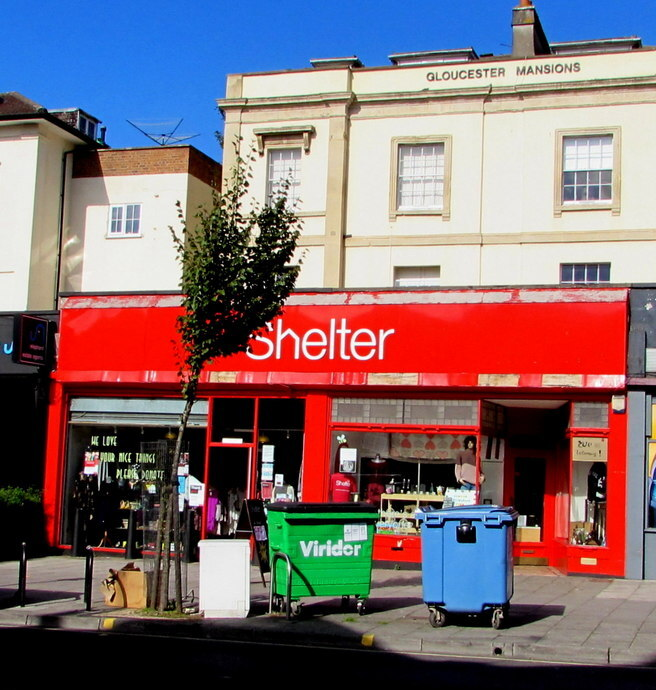
A Shelter charity shop

Shelter, formally Shelter, the National Campaign for Homeless People Limited, is a registered charity operating in England and Scotland that campaigns on housing and homelessness and provides advice and legal support to people experiencing housing problems. Despite its focus on homelessness, Shelter does not provide accommodation itself; its work instead includes campaigning, research and policy advocacy.

In 2023/24, Shelter reported income of £81.33 million and expenditure of £82.65 million. Total staff costs were £53.39 million, including £43.89 million in wages and salaries. Shelter had an average of 1,237 employees during the year, of whom 730 worked in functions classified as charitable activities, including "national and community services, legal services, telephone and online advice, campaigning, communications and policy." The charity's income included £4.31 million from government contracts and £3.11 million from government grants. Its chief executive, Polly Neate, received a salary of £145,311.

== History ==
Shelter was launched on 1 December 1966, evolving out of the work on behalf of homeless people then being carried on in Notting Hill in London. The launch of Shelter hugely benefited from the coincidental screening, in November 1966, of the BBC television play Cathy Come Home ten days before Shelter's launch. It was written by Jeremy Sandford and directed by Ken Loach – and highlighted the plight of the homeless in Britain. Shelter was set up by the Rev Bruce Kenrick after forming the Notting Hill Housing Trust in 1963. The social campaigner Des Wilson, having seen Cathy Come Home, became pivotal in the development of Shelter. Bishop Eamon Casey was also a founder of Shelter while chaplain to Irish diaspora in London. Following the success of its English counterpart, launched in 1966, Shelter brought its campaign north of the Border to Scotland in October 1968.

=== Union action ===
In 2008, Shelter saw strike action by its staff in response to changes being made to their terms and conditions. In 1992, a dispute over pay led to a two-week strike.

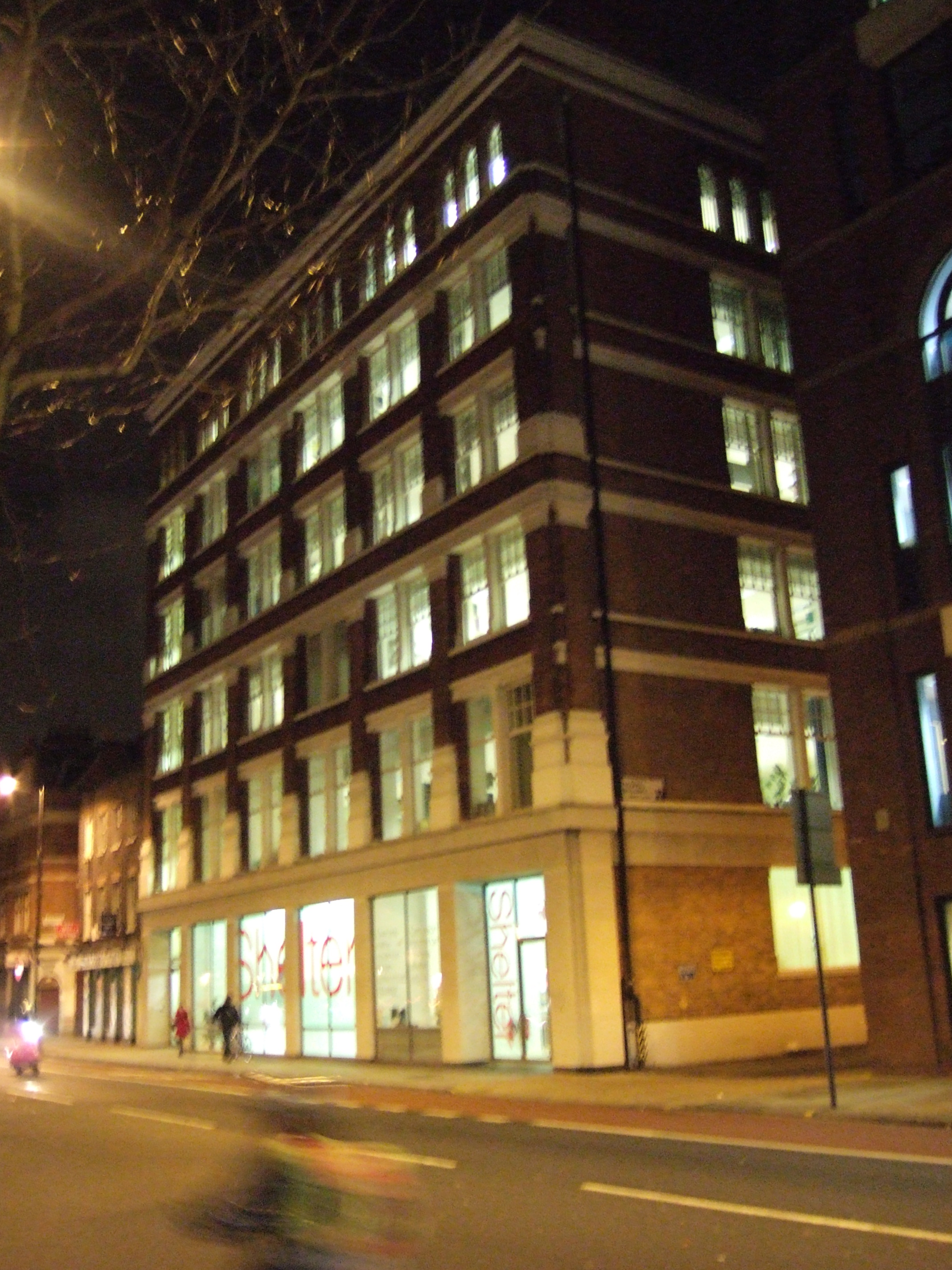
The Shelter headquarters in Old Street, London

=== Criticism ===
In September 2026, Shelter was criticised after The Mail on Sunday reported that the charity had asked a homeless former soldier to incorporate comments about migrants into his personal account of homelessness. Shelter reportedly suggested adding the statement, "We need social homes. Everything else, putting the blame on migrants … is unacceptable," after noting concerns that people "conflate veterans being homeless with migrants 'getting homes'". The veteran objected that this introduced a political message into his personal testimony. Katie Lam, the Conservative MP and Shadow Secretary of State for Housing, condemned Shelter over the incident. Shelter subsequently apologised, stating that its "approach to working with one of our storytellers was not the right one in this instance" and that it was committed to telling people's stories "in an authentic way".

== Financial information ==
=== For the year ended March 2024 (England) ===
- Total income: £81,331,000
- Total expenditure: £82,654,000
- Fundraising costs: £18,569,000
- Total cost of charitable activities: £49,481,000
- Total charity funds: £22,871,000

=== Sources of funding ===
England:

- 55% from donations and legacies
- 13% from Shelter shops
- 30% from funded advice and support
- 2% from training and publications

Shelter’s retail activity, reported £12.830 million in income against £14.831 million in costs for 2024/25. After allocating support costs, this resulted in a net loss of £2.001 million.

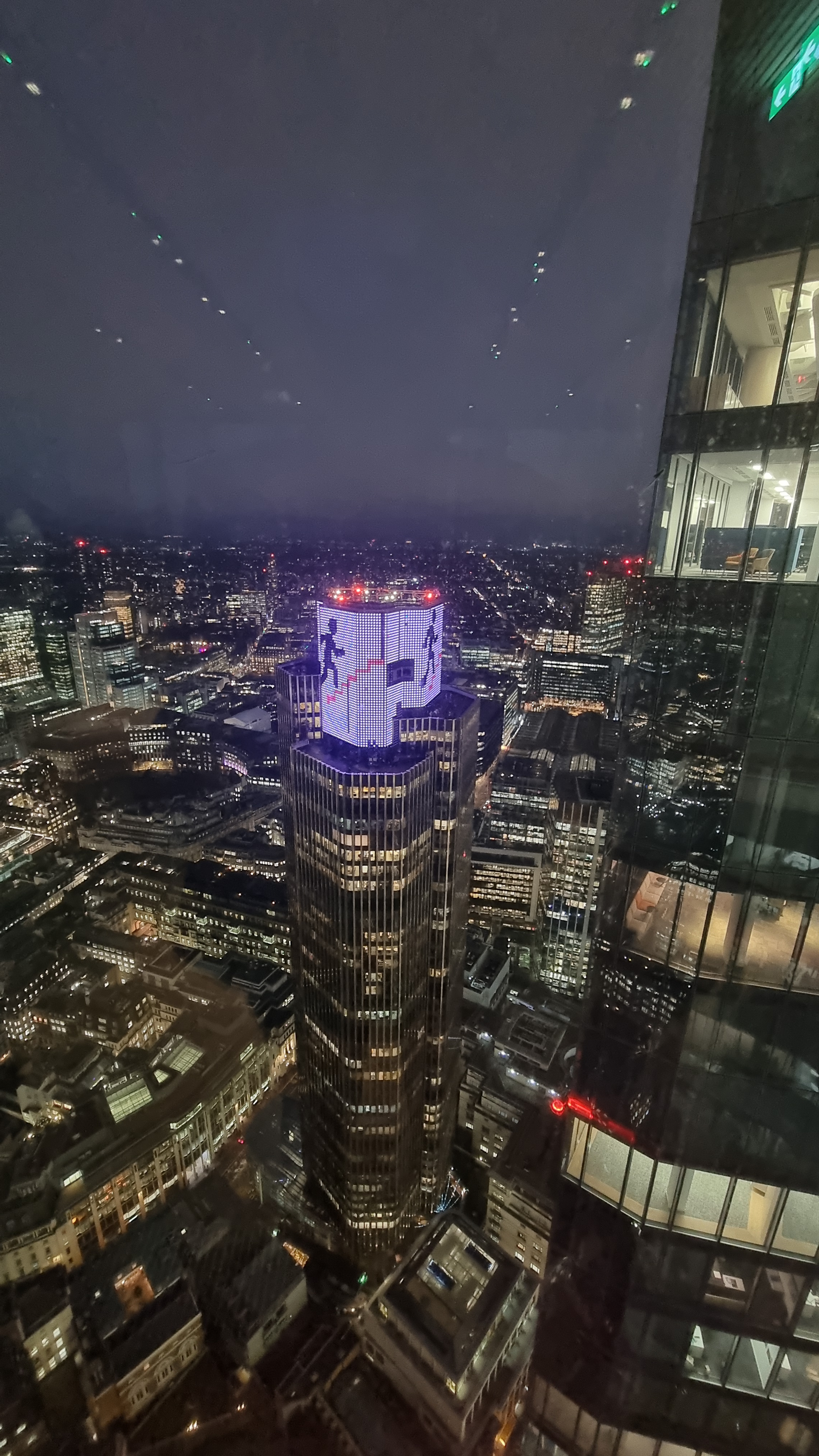
The NatWest Tower (Tower 42) viewed from 50th floor of 8 Bishopsgate on 28 February 2024, the date of the "Vertical Rush" charity stair climb event

An annual charity fundraising event called Vertical Rush takes place inside London's former NatWest Tower (officially Tower 42). It is a vertical run of 932 steps to the top of the tower.

== See also ==
- Shelter Cymru
- Homelessness in the United Kingdom
