= Manor House, London =

District in the London Borough of Hackney, in England

Coordinates: 51.57182°N 0.09671°W

Manor House
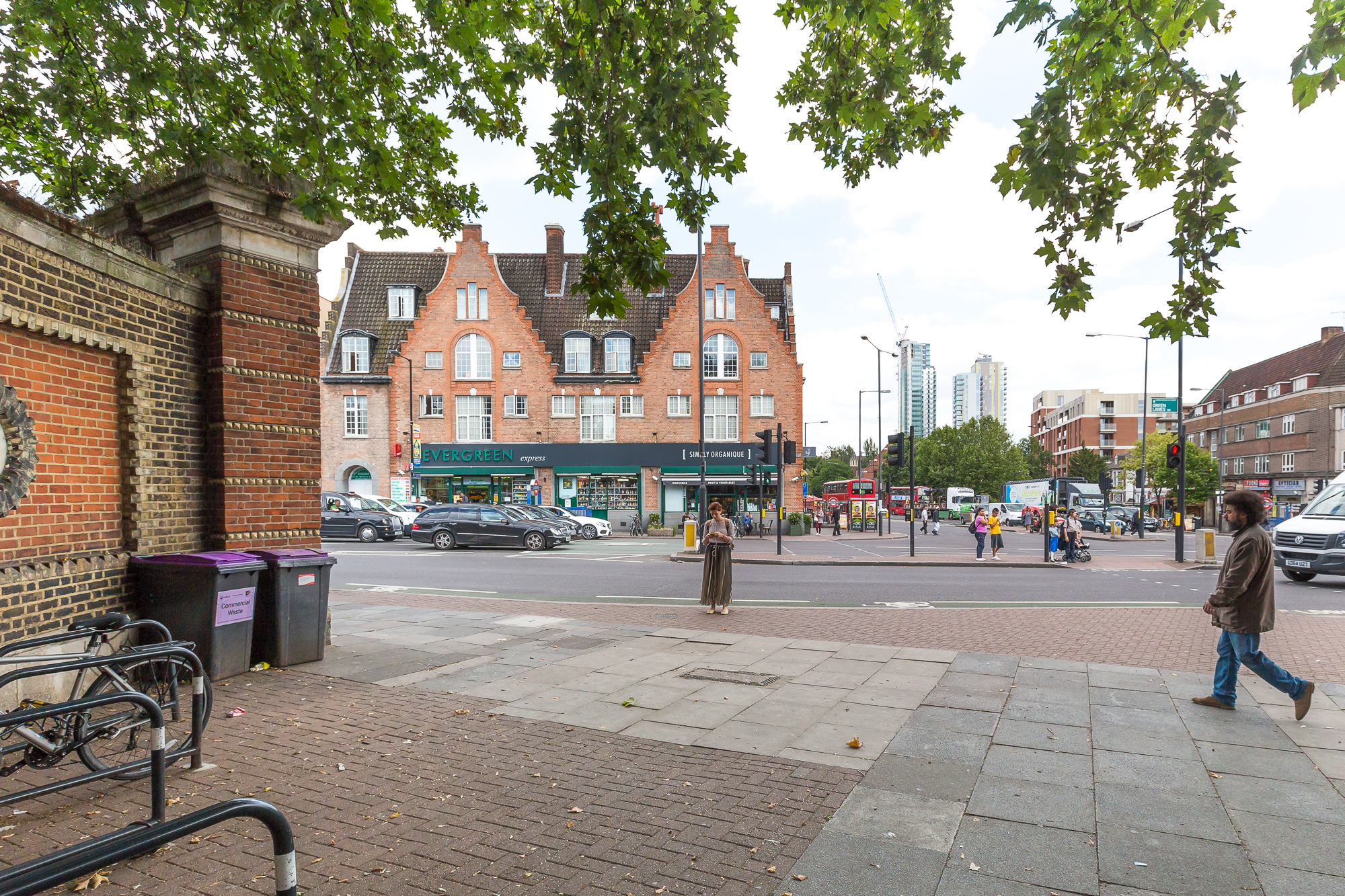

- Location within Greater London
- OS grid reference: TQ320876
- London borough: Hackney
- Ceremonial county: Greater London
- Region: London
- Country: England
- Sovereign state: United Kingdom
- Post town: LONDON
- Postcode district: N4
- Police: Metropolitan
- Fire: London
- Ambulance: London
- UK Parliament: Hackney North and Stoke Newington
- London Assembly: North East

Manor House is a district in the London Borough of Hackney. Located in North London, it lies immediately east of Finsbury Park, west of Stamford Hill and south of Harringay.

The area was originally known as Woodberry Down. However, the construction of the Seven Sisters Road and the consequent establishment of the Manor House Tavern gave rise to the alternative name Manor House Crossroads and with the arrival of the tube station in 1932, the area immediately around the tube station began to be known as Manor House. The demolition of the once very fashionable area of Woodberry Down and its replacement with one of London's biggest public housing estates resulted in 'Woodberry Down Estate' being used to refer to the public housing area and 'Manor House' for the area beyond. With the regeneration of the area during the early part of the 21st Century, the area is now being referred to once again by its nineteenth-century name of 'Woodberry Down'.

== Location ==
Built up during the middle part of the nineteenth century as part of an area called Woodberry Down, Manor House is now a small district without a formal town centre, but distant enough from other town centres that it has come to be referred to as an area. Taking its name from the Manor House Tavern (see below), via the Manor House tube station, it is centred at the junction of Seven Sisters Road and Green Lanes. The western border is defined by Finsbury Park in the neighbourhood of Harringay. Its other borders are defined by the New River, which loops around it on three sides. The area consists mainly of the Woodberry Down development and the Woodberry Down reservoirs. The reservoirs were constructed in 1833 to purify the New River water and to act as a water reserve. The East reservoir is now a nature reserve known as Woodberry Wetlands, following a redevelopment in 2016 as part of the wider regeneration of Woodberry Down, and the West Reservoir is now a leisure facility, offering sailing, canoeing and other water sports. On its western edge stands the former filter house, now set out as a visitor centre with a café; some of the old hydraulic machinery can be viewed in the main hall. The pumping station at the reservoir gates, converted to a climbing centre in 1995 was designed in a distinctive castellated style by Robert Billings under the supervision of William Chadwell Mylne and built in 1854–56. There are also two small shopping areas, playgrounds, three schools and a pub.

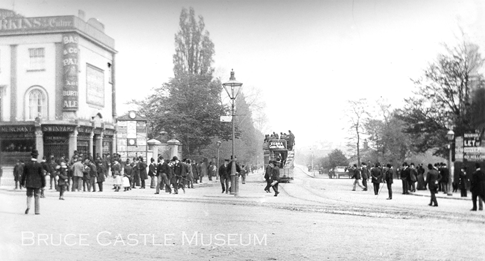
Manor House, looking East along Seven Sisters Road, c 1905

== History ==
=== Early development ===
Prior to any building development, the area was part of the demesne lands of Stoke Newington Manor. It was also part of the near coterminous ancient parish and Metropolitan Borough of Stoke Newington.

The area was known as 'Berrie Down Wood' in the seventeenth century and 'Wood Berry Downs Meadow' a hundred years later.

Building started on Green Lanes with the appearance in 1821 of a large house at a spot that would later be the site of the junction with Woodberry Down (the road). Further north on Green Lanes, just to the south of the New River, Northumberland House, a three-storeyed building with a pillared entrance, balustrade, and urns on its roof, was completed in 1822. It was sold for conversion to a 'private lunatic asylum' in 1826 It was then used as a private mental hospital until it was demolished in 1955. One of its most famous patients was Vivienne Haigh-Wood Eliot, first wife of the American poet T.S. Eliot, who lived at the hospital from 1938 until her death in 1947.

A thatched cottage, with Gothic windows, was constructed on the boundary with the borough of Tottenham by 1825. Woodberry Down Cottages, four detached houses on the south side of Woodberry Down, had been built by 1829. Manor House tavern was built nearby in 1830. With the development of Finsbury Park almost a certainty, the land to the south and east of the present-day park was acquired by the Ecclesiastical Commissioners as ideal for building. The park was laid out between 1857 and 1869 and the adjacent land was sold to builders.

During the 1860s, Thomas John Angell, who appears to have been a speculator rather than a builder, built Finsbury Park Villas. This was a terrace of at least twelve houses, which, starting with the Finsbury Park Tavern, ran northward along Green Lanes from its junction with the new Woodberry Grove.

At around the same time, Angell and a London builder Thomas Oldis were responsible for development that began to spread eastward along the north side of Seven Sisters Road. From 1868 to 1870 large detached houses with gardens running down to the New River were built at the east end of Seven Sisters Road. In 1867 3 acres (12,000 m^{2}) were leased on the southern side of the eastern end of the road, for the building of four detached or nine 'substantial' houses; three detached houses were built by 1871. An architect, William Reddall of Finsbury, was one of those who leased the houses. Woodberry Down was laid out in 1868, when it was extended eastward from Lordship Road, and villas were built on the south side in the late 1860s. The area was the northern section of a district called Brownswood Park (named after Brownswood Manor) and was regarded as a particularly select suburb.

However, with the increasing suburbanisation of the area, mainly for the middle and lower middle classes, many of the original families had moved out by 1895 and others were being replaced by poorer people in 1913. Social decline continued, until in 1954 the district was inhabited mainly by students, foreigners, and the working class, with most houses containing four or five families and all in decay.

=== Twentieth-century redevelopment – the Woodberry Down Estate ===
From 1949 through to the 1970s much of the area was redeveloped, the old houses being demolished and replaced with a large council development known locally as Woodberry Down. The LCC compulsorily purchased the area for this purpose in 1934 in order to alleviate chronic housing shortages, but work did not begin till after the Second World War. Construction began in 1949 and the 57 blocks of flats were completed in 1962.

Initially, the estate offered greatly improved living conditions for tenants. However, over time, the estate suffered the problems of comparably idealistic, post-war, social housing projects. By the late 1980s, many of the flats were in a poor state of repair, while many more were empty and boarded up with metal shutters.

=== 1980s squatter community ===
Throughout the 1980s and 1990s the increasing number of abandoned properties on the estate became occupied by a growing squatter community. The squatters at Woodberry Down Estate were predominantly young punks from all over the UK and Ireland. Several had squatted previously in the Noel Park area in Wood Green. The squatters’ relationship with tenants ranged from amicable to antagonistic, but the two communities generally managed to co-exist without too much hostility. The strong community spirit, which existed among residents in the 1950s was still evident to a lesser extent during this time, and the estate managed to avoid the more extreme crime and social problems often associated with inner-city housing projects. The sharp increase in numbers of squatters has clear links to the huge increases in homelessness in London that resulted from Thatcherite policies, such as the Right to Buy scheme (introduced in the Housing Act 1980).

== The Manor House Tavern ==
The Original Manor House pub, looking north towards Harringay, c.1860

The tavern was the source of the name of the tube station and consequently the immediate vicinity. The first tavern on the site was built by Stoke Newington builder Thomas Widdows between 1830 and 1834 next to the turnpike on Green Lanes. Prior to this date a cottage had existed on the site, but in 1829 an Act of Parliament was passed to permit the building of the Seven Sisters Road. Thomas Widdows was both the owner of the house and its occupant. With the building soon to be sited on the junction of the existing Green Lanes turnpike road and the new Seven Sisters Road, Widdows no doubt saw a roadside tavern as an excellent investment.

The new building was within sight of the Hornsey Wood Tavern, which had been formed out of the old Copt Hall, the manor house of the Manor of Brownswood. It is possible that its name was taken from this connection. The land itself however was on the demesne of Stoke Newington Manor. At around the time that the pub was first built, on the southern boundary of the demesne, on Church Street, a school called Manor School was operating. The school was next door to the trading premises of Thomas Widdows, builder of the pub. So it is equally possible that the 'Manor House' name was just a fashionable name, more related to the connection with Stoke Newington Manor.

Robert Baily, the first of many Manor House Tavern landlords, described his establishment as a 'public house and tea-gardens' He placed the following advertisement in the Morning Advertiser on 30 June 1834.

Robert Baily, late of the Eyre Tavern, St John’s Wood, having taken the above newly erected House, fitted up in a most superior manner, and commanding extensive and delightful views, solicit from his friends and the public that support he has hitherto been favoured with, assuring them that no exertion shall be wanting on his part to merit their patronage. The Grounds adjoining are admirably calculated for Cricket, Trap-ball, or any other amusement requiring space. There is likewise a large Garden and Bowling green, good Stabling, lock-up Coach-houses, &c. Dinners for Public and Private Parties. An Ordinary on Sundays at two o’clock.

Baily died just three years later. In 1838 the tavern was taken over by George Stacey who had previously been at the Adelaide Tavern in Hackney Road. The tavern changed hands again several times after Stacey.

On 25 October 1843 Queen Victoria and Prince Albert 'visited' the pub when they were travelling by carriage from Windsor to Cambridge. The route included the still relatively new Seven Sisters Road and a stop was made at the Manor House Tavern for the first change of horses. A tablet with the following inscription was placed on the side of the pub.

QVEENE VICTORIA HALTED HERE
YE 25TH Oct A.D.
1843

In 1851 it was purchased by James Toomer. According to the Morning Post, Toomer was 'well respected in literary and theatrical circles'. The new owner added function rooms including a banqueting hall and ballroom which became known as the Manor House Assembly Rooms. Soon after purchase he obtained licences for both music and dancing and the pub became a regular venue for events of both sorts. In the summer of 1870 Toomer advertised a new ballroom and later that summer sold the pub. The advertisement of sale gave the following description:

The Manor House, Roadside Inn and Wine Vaults The above property has for years been recognised as one of the best in its class which is amply testified by the enormous and peculiarly profitable trade attached thereto; and in order that no misconception may arise as to the nature of the business, the auctioneers deem it wise to announce the tavern business and trade dinners have been discontinued for several years and the present returns are entirely confined to the counter and grounds from which sources they amount upwards are £5,000 pounds per annum.

The building was bought by John Charles Kay who sold it two years later to Samuel Perrin A further change of ownership in 1878 saw the pub in the hands of Stephen Medcalf. In 1879 Morris Benjamin made an application to renew the music and dancing licence as the licensee. In 1890 it was taken on by James Swinyard who remodelled and modernised it shortly after the sale. Swinyard managed the pub till his death in 1910. Subsequently, his widow Amelia took over the licence until the late 1920s. In 1930 the imminent arrival of the Piccadilly Line led to the widening of the road, the demolition of the old tavern and the erection of current building. Behind the new building, offices were built for London Transport To the chagrin of her sons, Amelia Swinyard sold the pub to a buyer who then received the compensation when the pub's land was taken to accommodate these buildings. Amelia died in October 1937, aged 90 at the Kenwood Nursing Home in Muswell Hill.

In later years the pub was the first employer of Richard Desmond, now the owner of the Daily Express and Daily Star. The building also housed a nightclub that was popular among Goths in the mid-1980s. Two decades earlier it had functioned as a music venue called the Bluesville R.& B. Club, hosting artists such as Cream, Georgie Fame and the Blue Flames, Long John Baldry and his Hoochie Coochie Men, Rod Stewart (then nicknamed 'Rod the Mod'), John Mayall's Bluesbreakers, the Jimi Hendrix Experience, Fairport Convention, Fleetwood Mac, Jeff Beck, the Spencer Davis Group, Graham Bond and Zoot Money. The ground floor of the building is now occupied by Evergreen supermarket and Simply Organique Café.

== The area in the twenty-first century ==
Since 2007, Woodberry Down has been undergoing a phased redevelopment which involved the construction of more than 5,500 modern flats on the site, 41% of which will be affordable, for an investment of c. £1bn. The plan was initially conceived during a time of economic growth under the New Labour administration in the late 1990s. In 2002, a structural assessment concluded that 54% (31 out of 57 existing buildings) were beyond economic repair. To progress the redevelopment, Hackney Council struck a deal with Genesis Housing Association and Berkeley Homes for the estate's demolition and redevelopment. The urban regeneration project has been amongst the largest in the UK and is due to complete in 2035.

In 2021, the construction of a Travelodge hotel opposite the tube station was completed.

=== Phases of the redevelopment ===
- Phase 1 comprised a number of sites across Woodberry Down. The construction started in 2009 and was completed in 2019. It included the construction of the Skyline, tallest residential building in North London.
- Phase 2 comprises an area of 4.3 hectares, south of Seven Sisters Road, east of Green Lanes and north of the West Reservoir. This phase involves the construction of 4 buildings, totalling 850 homes (of which 109 are social rented, 200 shared ownership and 543 private), and was completed in 2022.
- Phase 3 was approved by the Planning Committee in September 2020. The area covers 2.2 hectares at the southeast corner of Seven Sisters Road and Woodberry Grove, where 4 residential blocks of 6 to 20 storeys are to be constructed, comprising 584 new homes (of which 117 are for social rent, 126 for shared ownership and 341 private). The plan also includes the construction of a public park and the addition of 175 new trees. An energy centre, which will provide heat to the whole development, will also be built on the site. Works were originally expected to commence in 2017 but did not start until 2020, with the first homes expected to be completed by 2024.
- Phase 4 comprises the area at the southwest corner of Seven Sisters Road and Woodberry Grove. It was originally estimated to commence in 2020 with completion from 2023.
- Phase 5 comprises the area south of Seven Sisters Road, north of the East Reservoir and east of Phase 3. It was originally estimated to commence in 2023 with completion from 2027.
- Phase 6 comprises the area at the northwest corner of Seven Sisters Road and Woodberry Grove. It was originally estimated to commence in 2026 with completion from 2029.
- Phase 7 comprises the area north of Seven Sisters Road at the eastern edge of the development. It was originally estimated to commence in 2029 with completion from 2032.
- Phase 8 comprises the area at the northeast corner of Green Lanes and Woodberry Grove. It was originally estimated to commence in 2032 with completion from 2035.

=== Prizes and awards ===
- The first phase of the development produced 117 homes let by Genesis on social rents, and won the top prize for social housing at the Daily Telegraph British Homes Awards 2011.
- The development also won the project of the year award and the regeneration project award in 2018 from the Royal Institution of Chartered Surveyors (RICS).

=== Controversies ===
The redevelopment has been controversial, with some commentators calling the plans 'state sponsored gentrification'.

== Governance ==
The area covers the Woodberry Down ward which is one of the wards in the London Borough of Hackney. Latest elections at the ward were held on 22 May 2014. There were 6,417 eligible voters and a turnout of 40.8%.

Woodberry Down ward election, 2014
Party	Candidate	Votes	%	±%
Labour	Jon Burke	1,653	69.1	
Liberal Democrats	Topsy Coffer	108	4.5	
Conservative	Efrayim Goldstein	460	19.2	
Liberal Democrats	Myall Alain Hornsby	78	3.3	
Green	Anna Hughes	281	11.7	
Green	Karen Rachel Kelly Moss	305	12.8	
Conservative	Chaya Odze	419	17.5	
Labour	Caroline Selman	1,480	61.9	
Majority				
Turnout		2,615	40.8	
Labour hold		Swing		

== Demography ==
At the time of the 2011 census, there were 8,758 residents in Woodberry Down. The Woodberry Down Ward census findings revealed 50.0% of Woodberry Down's population was White (27.6% British, 19.9% Other, 2.3% Irish and 0.2% Gypsy or Irish Traveller). 25.4% was Black (6.4% Caribbean, 15.6% African, 3.4% Other), 10.3% was Asian (1.9% Indian, 0.8% Pakistani, 2.4% Bangladeshi, 2.2% Chinese and 3% Other) and 14.4% was other ethnic groups.

41.9% of the ward were Christian, 17.9% Muslim, 9.2% Jewish, 2.8% other religion, 17.9% had no religion and 10.6% did not state their religion.

== Image gallery ==
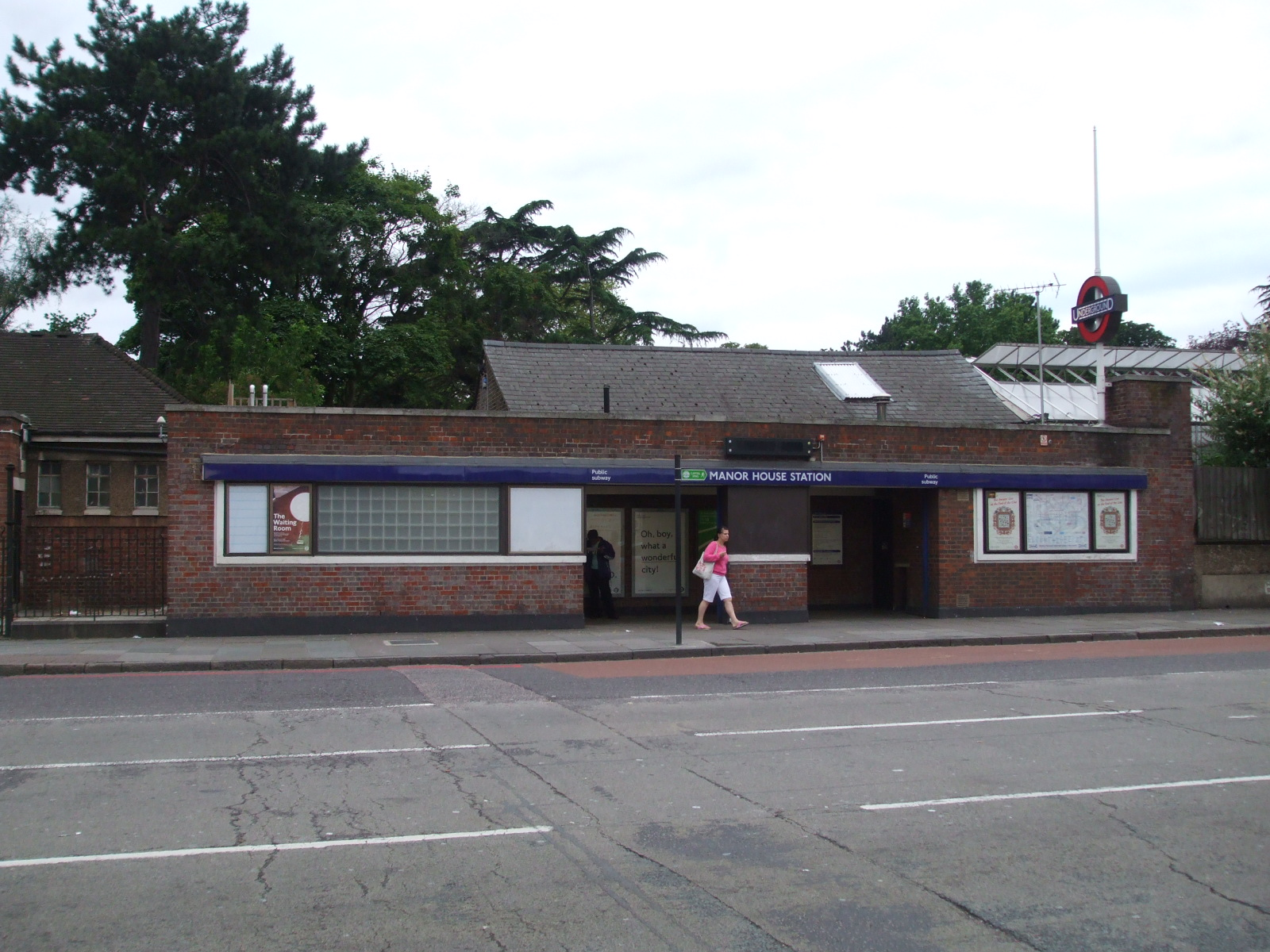
Manor House tube station entrance on the western side of Green Lanes, north of Seven Sisters' Road

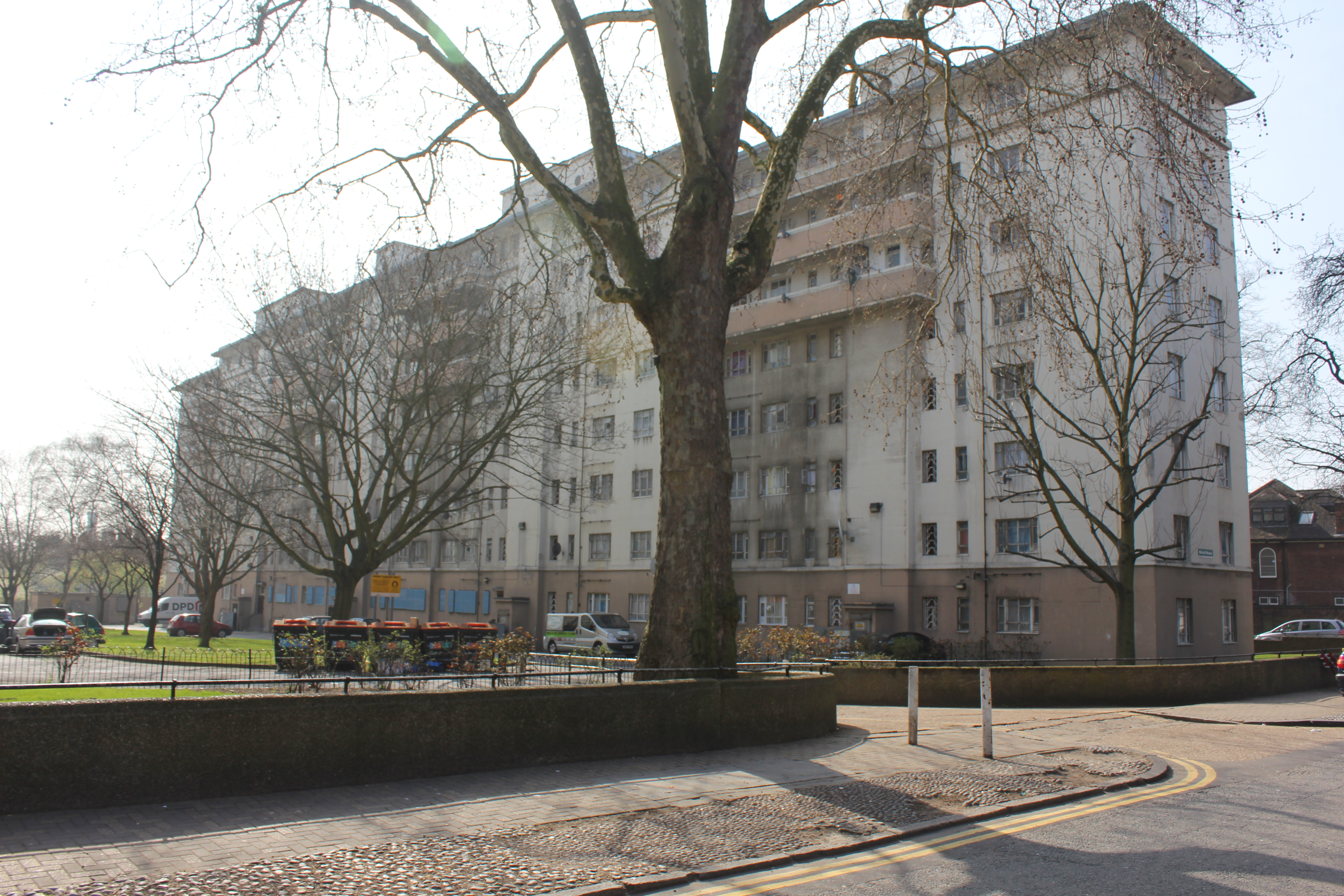
Nicholl House (now demolished) was part of the Woodberry Down Estate. It has been falsely reported that the building featured in the film Schindler's List.

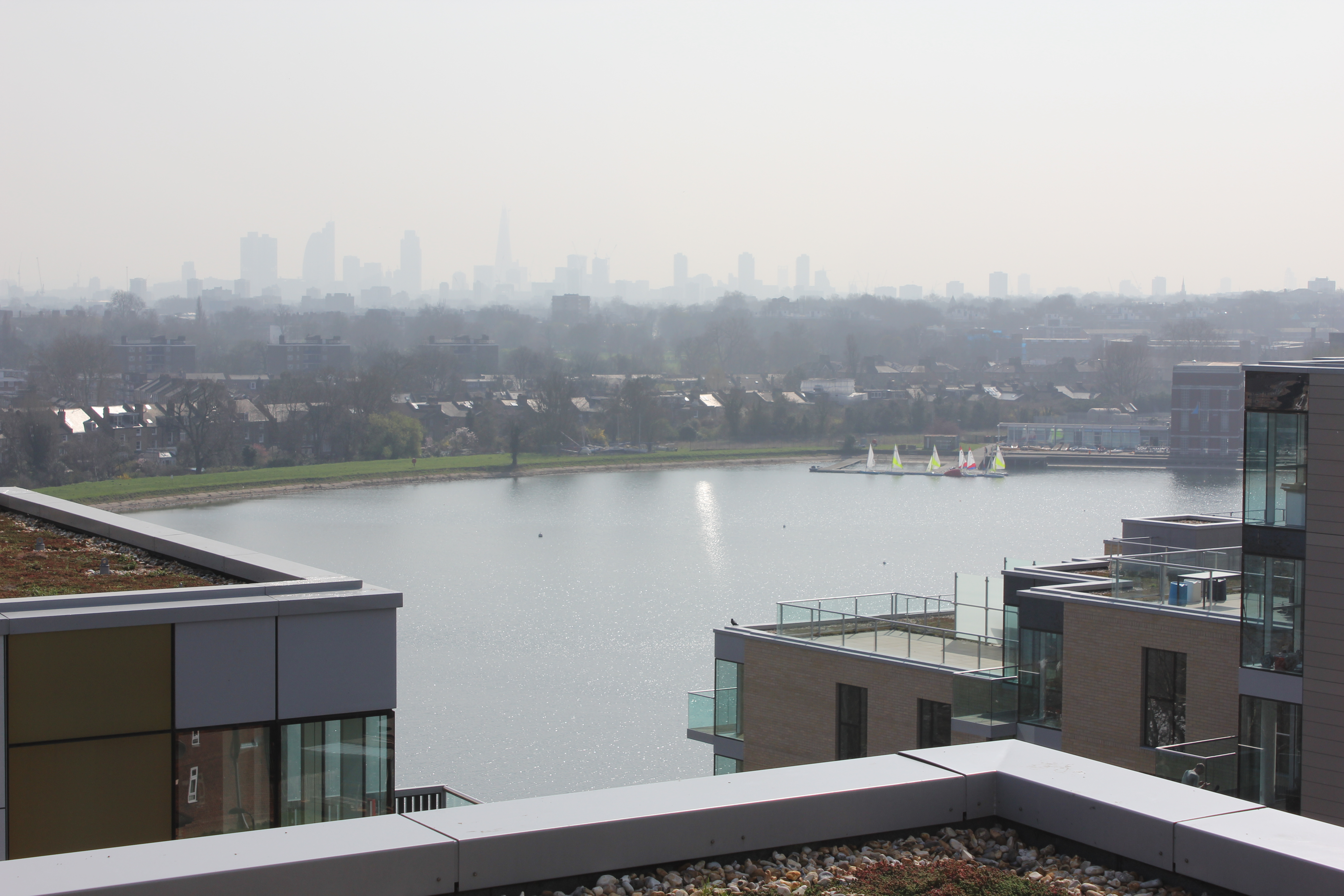
View from a flat in the new development at Woodberry Down, March 2012

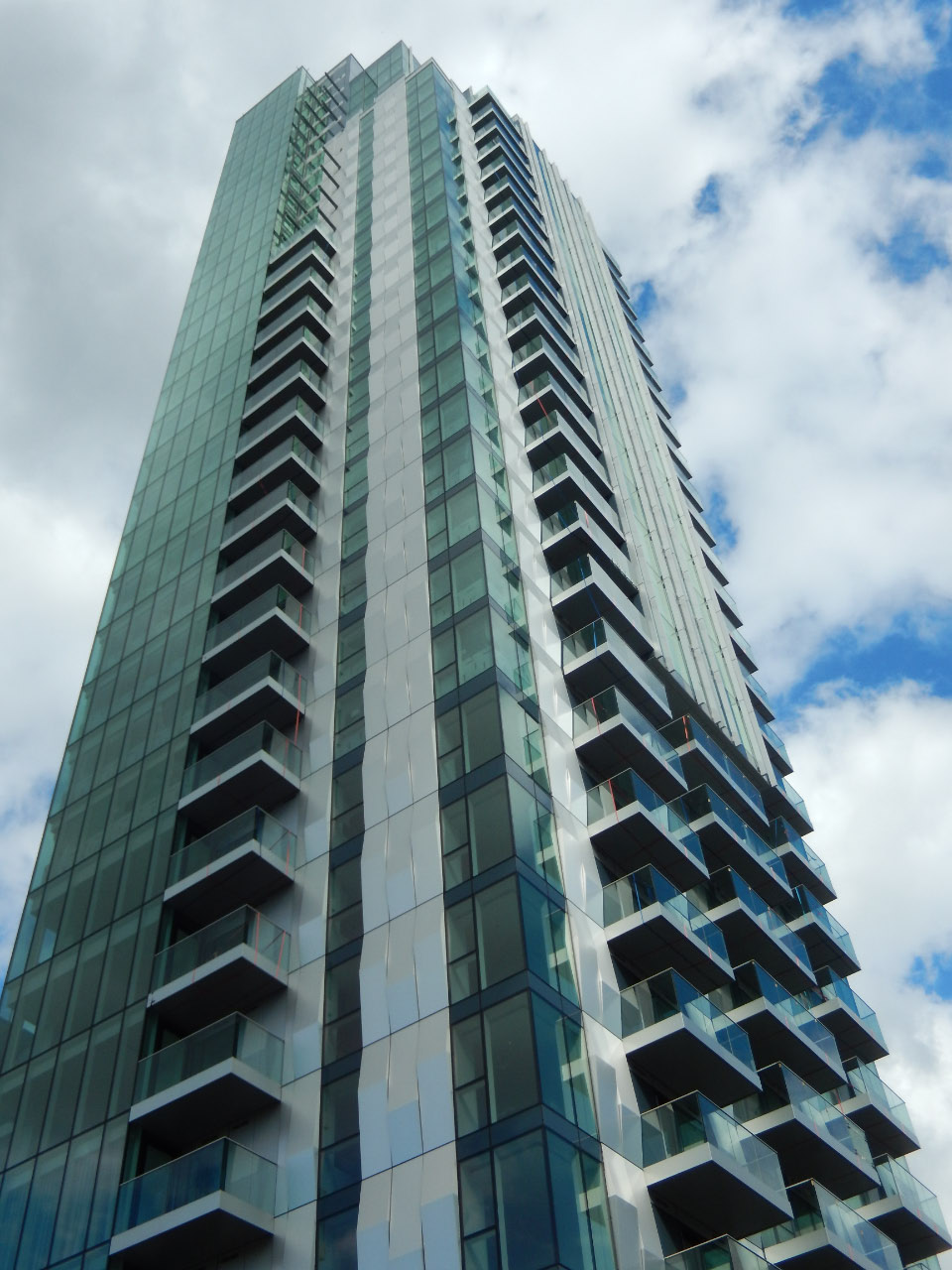
Skyline tower at Woodberry Down

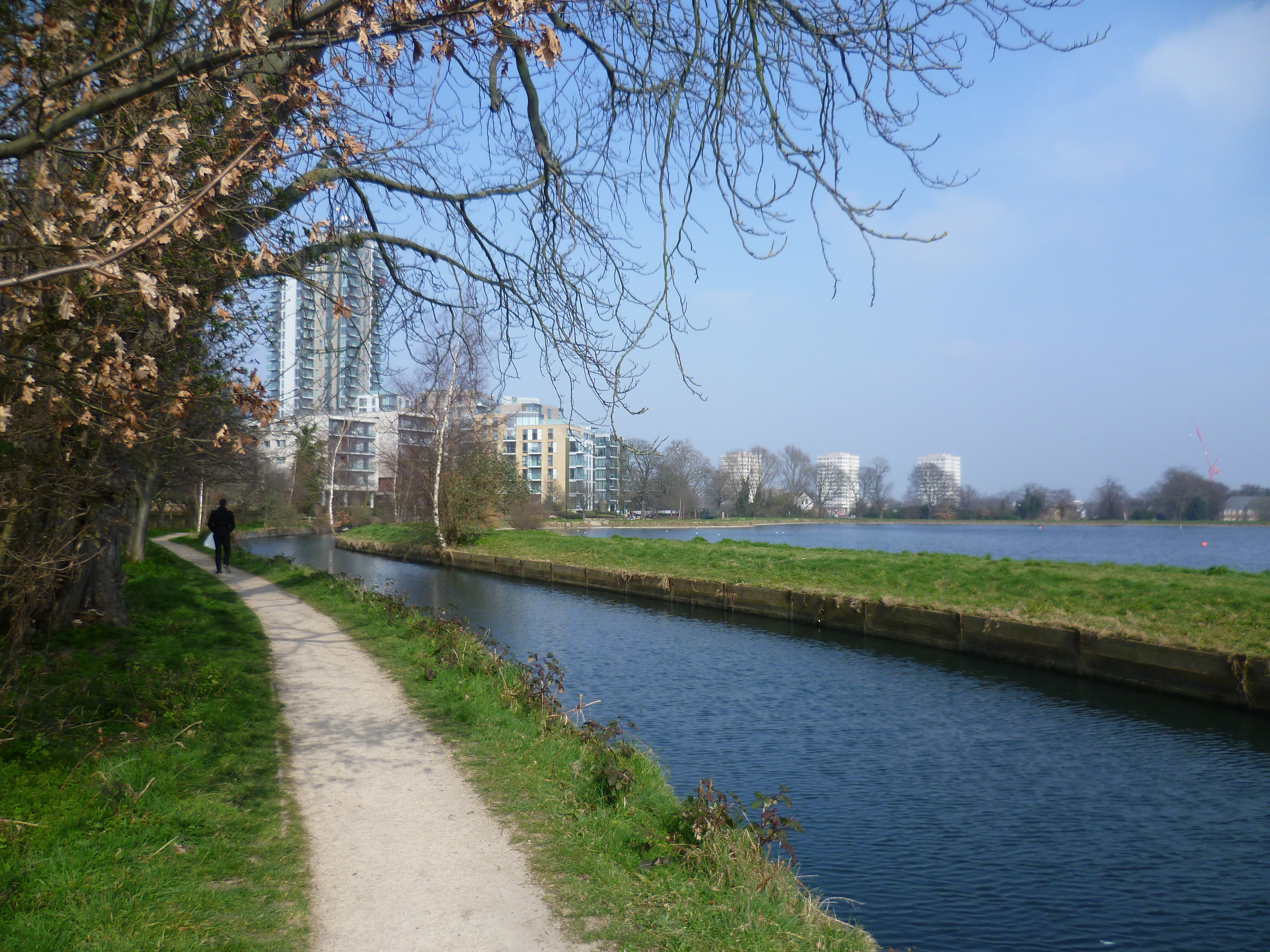
The New River through Woodberry Down

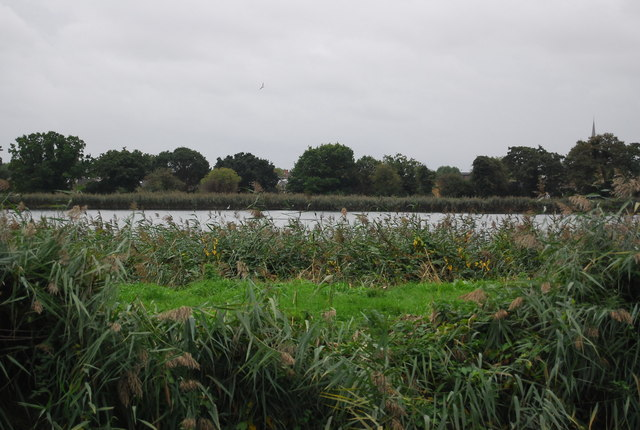
Woodberry Wetlands East Reservoir

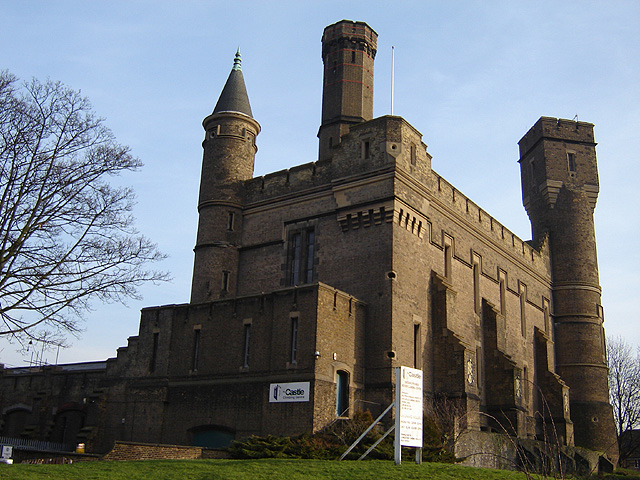
The Castle Climbing Centre next to the West Reservoir, once the main Water Board pumping station

== Education ==
The area has 3 schools and 1 public library:

- Woodberry Down Community Primary School (State-funded primary school)
- Skinners' Academy (State-funded secondary school)
- Beis Chinuch Lebonos Girls School (Independent school)
- Woodberry Down Library (Public library)

== Transport and locale ==
=== Nearby places ===
- Harringay
- Finsbury Park
- Seven Sisters
- Stamford Hill
- Stoke Newington

=== Nearest railway stations ===
- Manor House tube station
- Harringay Green Lanes railway station
- Finsbury Park station
- Seven Sisters station
- Stamford Hill railway station

=== Bus routes ===
The following bus routes serve Manor House: 29, 141, 253, 254, 259, 341 (24 hour) and Night Bus routes N29, N253 and N279.
