= Shelter Cymru =

Charity in Wales

Shelter Cymru is a housing and homelessness charity in Wales (Welsh: Cymru). Its vision is that a decent, secure home is a fundamental right and essential to the health and well-being of communities.

== Background ==
Shelter Cymru provides independent, specialist advice, advocacy and legal support for anyone with housing problems. In 2012 the charity's advisers helped nearly 17,000 people from across Wales, helping to prevent homelessness in 90 per cent of cases where it was threatened.

Through research, policy and campaigning activities, Shelter Cymru works to improve housing and homelessness legislation and services. Its education service aims to prevent homelessness by working with young people and providing detailed teaching and learning resources for schools and youth workers.

While Shelter Cymru works closely with its sister charity, Shelter, in England and Scotland, it is a completely independent charity focused entirely on the needs of people in Wales.

The President of Shelter Cymru is Welsh baritone Bryn Terfel and Vice-Presidents include Cerys Matthews and Rebecca Evans. The Director of Shelter Cymru is John Puzey.

In May 2012 a report by Shelter Cymru commissioned by the Welsh government found that homeless people in Wales were often treated with a lack of respect. This led Housing minister Huw Lewis to announce that more needed to be done to prevent the social exclusion of homeless people and pledged £7 million to help homeless people in Wales.

In January 2013, Shelter Cymru announced that it expected homelessness in Wales to rise. As a result, the Welsh government announced that it would work with Shelter Cymru amongst others to combat homelessness in Wales.

Registered charity number: 515902

== See also ==
- Homelessness in the United Kingdom
