= Dead Grandma =

Comedy Web series

- Genre: comedy, black comedy, surreal humor, parody
- Created by: Will Kindrick
- Written by: Will Kindrick; Courtney Branning; Matt Heder
- Directed by: Will Kindrick; Courtney Branning
- Starring: Jon Heder; Matt Heder; Beverly Welsh; Shannon Mary Dixon; Nicholas Zaharias; Umberto Riva; Chase Bingham; Will Kindrick; Michael Coady; Don Lucas; Tony Hello; Courtney Branning
- Opening theme: "Dead Grandma Theme Song" by Will Kindrick performed & arranged by Soundstage
- Composers: Garrick Hargrove, Amos Watene, Ben Lazarus, Ryan Augustine, Aaron Watene
- Country of origin: United States
- No. of seasons: 1
- No. of episodes: 10 (list of episodes)

Production
- Executive producers: Chad Perkins; Will Kindrick
- Producers: Tom Morrill; Matt Heder; Tanya Brum da Silveira
- Cinematography: Chris Saul
- Editor: Nate Fackrell
- Running time: 4-10 minutes
- Production company: Mummy Space Island Productions

Original release
- Release: September 22, 2011 – present

Dead Grandma is a 10-episode comedy Web series created by Will Kindrick. It is written by Kindrick, Courtney Branning, Matt Heder and is produced by Mummy Space Island Productions. The series follows the life of a hapless young college student Andy (Matt Heder), whose grandma (Beverly Welsh) comes back from the dead to help him find love. The series is hosted by Jon Heder who begins each episode with a campy intro reminiscent of the openings of nostalgic shows such as Masterpiece Theater and The Wonderful World of Disney.

Each episode follows a two-act structure split up by the opening title sequence and theme song. The series is often abruptly interrupted by parody commercial breaks. A PSA starring a Dead Grandma cast member is also featured after the end credits of every episode.

== Production ==
Dead Grandma combines live action with an animated sky and cloud background. The production took place over the course of two weekends in March & April 2010. Filming locations included Art Center College of Design, Pasadena City College, Cafe 50's, Big Mama's Rib Shack and various locations in Pasadena and Studio City. The series was mentored by television and film director Jeremiah Chechick.

== Inspiration ==
The writers often referred to the protagonist Andy as a self-deprecating Charlie Brown-type character from Peanuts since he is consistently bullied and fails and nearly everything he attempts. The tone of the series was heavily influenced by 1990s sitcoms such as Family Matters, Full House, Saved by the Bell, The Wonder Years, and The Simpsons.

== Setting ==
Dead Grandma takes place in the fictional city of Notpasadena where Andy and his classmates attend the shady Notpasadena Community College.

== Characters ==
Main Characters

- Series Host (Jon Heder)
- Andy (Matt Heder)
- Dead Grandma (Beverly Welsh)
- Judy (Shannon Mary Dixon)
- Meathead (Nicholas Zaharias)
- Wiseguy #1 (Chase Bingham)
- Wiseguy #2 (Will Kindrick)
- Fabrizio (Umberto Riva)

Reoccurring Characters

- Professor Hoskins (Michael Coady)
- Mr Flugelmen (Don Lucas)
- Stoner (Tony Hello)
- Gus Gus (Connor Dean)
- Mean Nerd (Erin Pearce)
- The Fabrizihoes

== Episodes ==
Episode #	Title	Running Time	Original Air Date
1	Library	5:34	September 20, 2011
2	Ice Cream	4:00	September 27, 2011
3	The Jacket	4:41	October 4, 2011
4	Wrong Crowd	4:26	October 11, 2011
5	Dirty Burlesque Tramp	4:21	October 18, 2011
6	Foreign Exchange Student	5:47	October 25, 2011
7	Job Interview	6:31	November 1, 2011
8	Drive In Movie	7:56	November 8, 2011
9	Pool Party	5:43	November 15, 2011
10	Finale	10:32	March 1, 2012

== Reception ==
Reviews

The Knife Fight praised the show as being "one of the more polished creations on the web today, boasting high production value as well as a hilariously original concept." The trailer currently has a 92% rating on Funny or Die.

Awards & nominations

Award	Category	Nominee	Result
2012 HollyWebs	Best Editing	Nate Fackrell, Will Kindrick	Won
2012 ITN Festival	Best Webisode	Will Kindrick, Matt Heder, Courtney Branning, Tom Morrill, Chad Perkins	Won
2012 IFQ Festival	Best Actor in a Webseries	Jon Heder	Won
2012 IFQ Festival	Best Director of a Webisode	Will Kindrick	Won
2012 HollyShorts	Best Webseries	Will Kindrick, Matt Heder, Courtney Branning, Tom Morrill, Chad Perkins	Nominated
2012 LA Comedy Fest	Best Web Series	Will Kindrick, Matt Heder, Courtney Branning, Tom Morrill, Chad Perkins	Nominated
2012 LA Webfest	Outstanding Comedy Series	Will Kindrick, Matt Heder, Courtney Branning, Tom Morrill, Chad Perkins	Won
2012 LA Webfest	Outstanding Original Score	Garrick Hargrove, Amos Watene, Ben Lazarus, Ryan Augustine	Won
2012 LA Webfest	Outstanding Original Theme song	Sound Stage	Won
2012 LA Webfest	Outstanding Lead Actress in a Comedy	Beverly Welsh	Won

== Soundtrack ==
=== Original Score ===
The score was written and performed by Garrick Hargrove and heavily features ukulele, chimes and shakers. The theme song melody is often revisited and reprised throughout the score. Several other original songs were written for specific episodes including "Delicious Creamy Sweets" written & performed by Ben Lazarus and "Super Exciting Pirate Adventure Explosion the Move 2" written & performed by Amos Watene, Aaron Watene, Matt Heder, Will Kindrick and Ryan Augustine.

=== Theme Song ===
The theme song pays homage to classic campy 1950's-60's television series. The song was written by Will Kindrick and performed, arranged and recorded by the Brea California based a cappella group, "Soundstage".

== Benefit Show ==
A benefit fundraiser concert was held July 30, 2010 on the roof top of the Fox Theater in Pomona CA to raise proceeds for the series. The show featured musical acts GOGO13, Digital Unicorn and Eyes Lips Eyes.
