= Kendrick =

Kendrick may refer to:

- Kendrick (name), including a list of people with the surname or given name

== Places ==
=== United States ===
- Kendrick, Florida
- Kendrick, Idaho
- Kendrick, Oklahoma

== Schools ==
- Kendrick School, in Reading, Berkshire, England, United Kingdom
- Reading School (Kendrick Boys School), in Reading, Berkshire, England, United Kingdom

== See also ==
- Kenrick, a surname
- Kindrick (disambiguation)
