= Franco-British Council =

- Formation: May 1, 1971; 55 years ago
- Purpose: to promote better understanding between Britain and France and to contribute to the development of joint action through meetings of leading representatives of the worlds of culture, science, education, politics and business in the context of a developing Europe and of an increasingly globalised community.
- Location: 10-11 Dacre Street, London, SW1H OD, United Kingdom
- Website: www.francobritishcouncil.org.uk

The Franco-British Council is an organisation created on the joint initiative of President Georges Pompidou and Prime Minister Edward Heath in order to promote better understanding between United Kingdom and France and to contribute to the development of joint action through meetings of leading representatives of the worlds of culture, science, education, politics and business in the context of a developing Europe and of an increasingly globalised community.

== History ==
In Paris in May 1971 the British Prime Minister, Edward Heath, met the French President, Georges Pompidou, for the discussions to pave the way for Britain's entry into the European Community. At this meeting, they reflected on the way in which contact between the two countries could be widened beyond the existing official mechanism for the exchange of ideas and information between the two governments. They concluded that there was a need for a non-governmental body which could sponsor seminars and colloques between people of like interests in the two countries. These meetings should not be confined just to cultural or educational matters, but aim to cover all fields where the two countries shared common problems, or could benefit from a better understanding of the others position.

On 16 May 1972, during the Queen's visit to Paris, an official communiqué was issued announcing the establishment of a Comite d'lnitiative Franco-britannique.

=== 40th Anniversary and beyond ===
In 2013, the Franco-British Council celebrated its 40th anniversary with an event at the Foreign and Commonwealth Office called 'Making the case for Europe'. The event featured a speech by the Rt Hon David Lidington MP, the Minister for Europe, as well as his French counterpart, Thierry Renpentin. Mr Lidington praised the FBC for being an organisation "which has been working tirelessly for the past four decades forging links across the Channel."

At the same event, Thierry Renpentin described the FBC " 'as a “bridge.' A bridge between our political classes, a bridge between our economic players and, above all, a bridge between our two civil societies.”

In 2015, Edward Leigh member of the Franco-British Council urged for closer co-operation between France and Britain in immigration policy. In June, Dominic Grieve told the council David Cameron's plan to alter human right legislation would make the European Convention on Human Rights "inoperable".

== Activities ==
The Council organises a programme of specialised meetings on a variety of subjects under the broad headings of:

- environment, energy and sustainable development
- economic reform in the context of European developments and globalisation
- social cohesion and immigration
- culture including the arts, heritage and new media

The seminars bring together leading professionals who are encouraged to develop bilateral networks. The council also publishes reports of the meetings, for the benefit both of the participants themselves and of policy makers in the two countries. Competitions exist to promote France and French to a younger age group.

=== Defence ===
Each year, the Franco-British defence conference brings together government people, senior military, industrialists, think tankers, academics and journalists on a set of issues affecting both nations and how they can work together to be better.

In 2012, Minister for Defence Equipment, Support and Technology Peter Luff gave a speech saying "Defence is central to the values the UK and France share."

In 2014, HE Sir Peter Ricketts, British Ambassador to France, described the conference as having "showed the value of an organisation like the Franco-British Council, who can convene people from a wider sphere perhaps than two governments would to contribute to the debate that we’re having."

== Funding ==
Basic funding is provided by the two governments, but the Council aims to supplement this for specific projects, with contributions from other sources. In its management of funds, the council is guided by its Trustees, by its Memorandum of Understanding and by its charitable status, and is independent of government.

== Organisation ==
=== Secretary-General ===
The council is run by Secretary-General Ann Kenrick CBE. Following fifteen years in the private sector selling Hydro Electric Plants to West Africa and managing top Information Technology Accounts at IBM, Ann has been running the British Section of the FBC for 20 years. In 2015 she received the Honour of the Chevalier de L'ordre national du Merite for her outstanding work in bringing France and Britain together over the past two decades.

In addition to her interest in Franco-British relations she has also developed a strong portfolio in the Environmental Transport arena as Chair of the London Cycling Campaign and founder/chair of a South London Safe Routes to School group.

She has chaired and spoken at many travel conferences and has published Let Me Out!; How to enjoy the school run, a book to encourage parents to let their children walk and bike to school.

=== Chair ===
The Chair is formally appointed by the Foreign Secretary and serves a maximum four years. Rt Hon Baroness Quin of Gateshead, Former Minister for Europe, stepped down in March 2013 after a highly successful four years as chair. The new Chair is Rt Hon Baroness Blackstone, former Opposition Spokeswoman on Foreign Affairs in the House of Lords.

=== Trustees ===
A board of trustees oversee the work of the council. Trustees are selected from the membership and serve a maximum of six years. A full board of trustees is available on the official website.

== See also ==
- Entente Cordiale
- Franco-British Union
- The Lancaster House Treaties (2010)
