= Woodberry Wetlands =

Nature reserve in the London Borough of Hackney

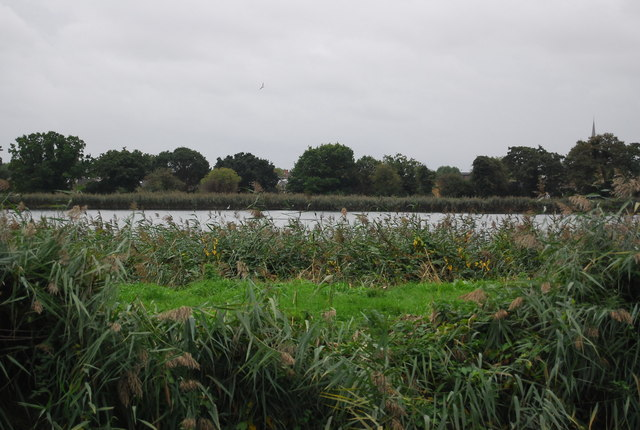
- Woodberry Wetlands East Reservoir
- Interactive map of Woodberry Wetlands
- Location: Manor House, England
- Nearest city: London
- Coordinates: 51°34′12″N 0°05′17″W
- Established: 2014: Opened in spring 2016
- Governing body: London Wildlife Trust
- Website: wildlondon.org.uk/nature-reserves/woodberry-wetlands

Woodberry Wetlands is a nature reserve and designated Site of Metropolitan Importance on the site of the East Reservoir in the Manor House area in the London Borough of Hackney. The site opened to the public for the first time in 200 years on 1 May 2016. Covering 4.5 ha (11 acres) and situated close to the Lee Valley, Woodberry Wetlands was acquired as a nature reserve in 2014. The site is owned by Thames Water and run by London Wildlife Trust.

After a major redevelopment the East Reservoir now offers free public access. The reserve was developed by London Wildlife Trust in collaboration with Thames Water, Berkeley Homes and London Borough of Hackney, with funding from Heritage Lottery Fund. The site contains a boardwalk, a visitors' centre with café, toilet facilities and a classroom. The New River Path runs alongside the northern edge of the reservoir. This forms part of a cycle route connecting to Walthamstow Wetlands, badged as the 'Wetlands to Wetlands Greenway'.

== History ==
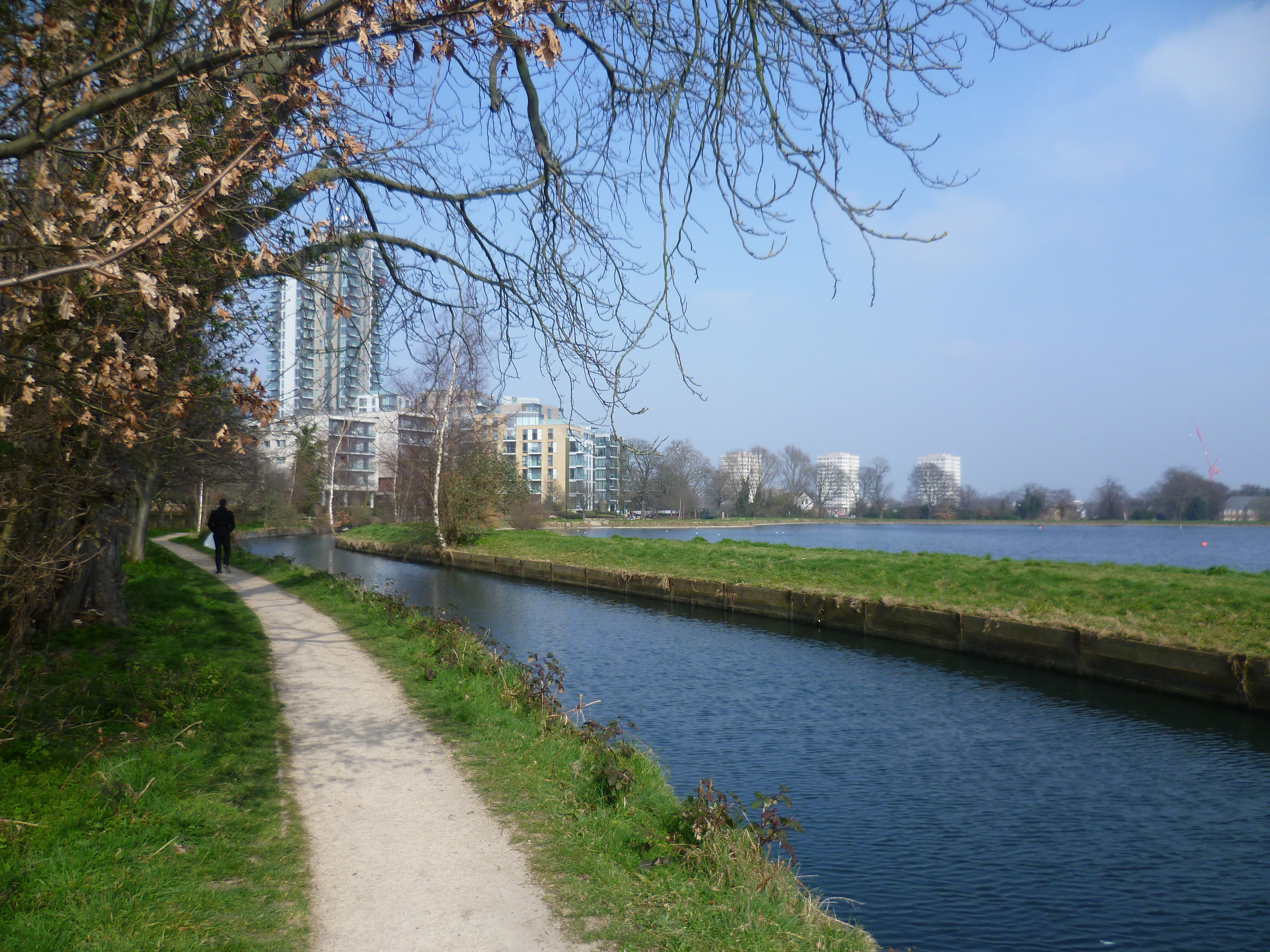
The New River by Woodberry Down

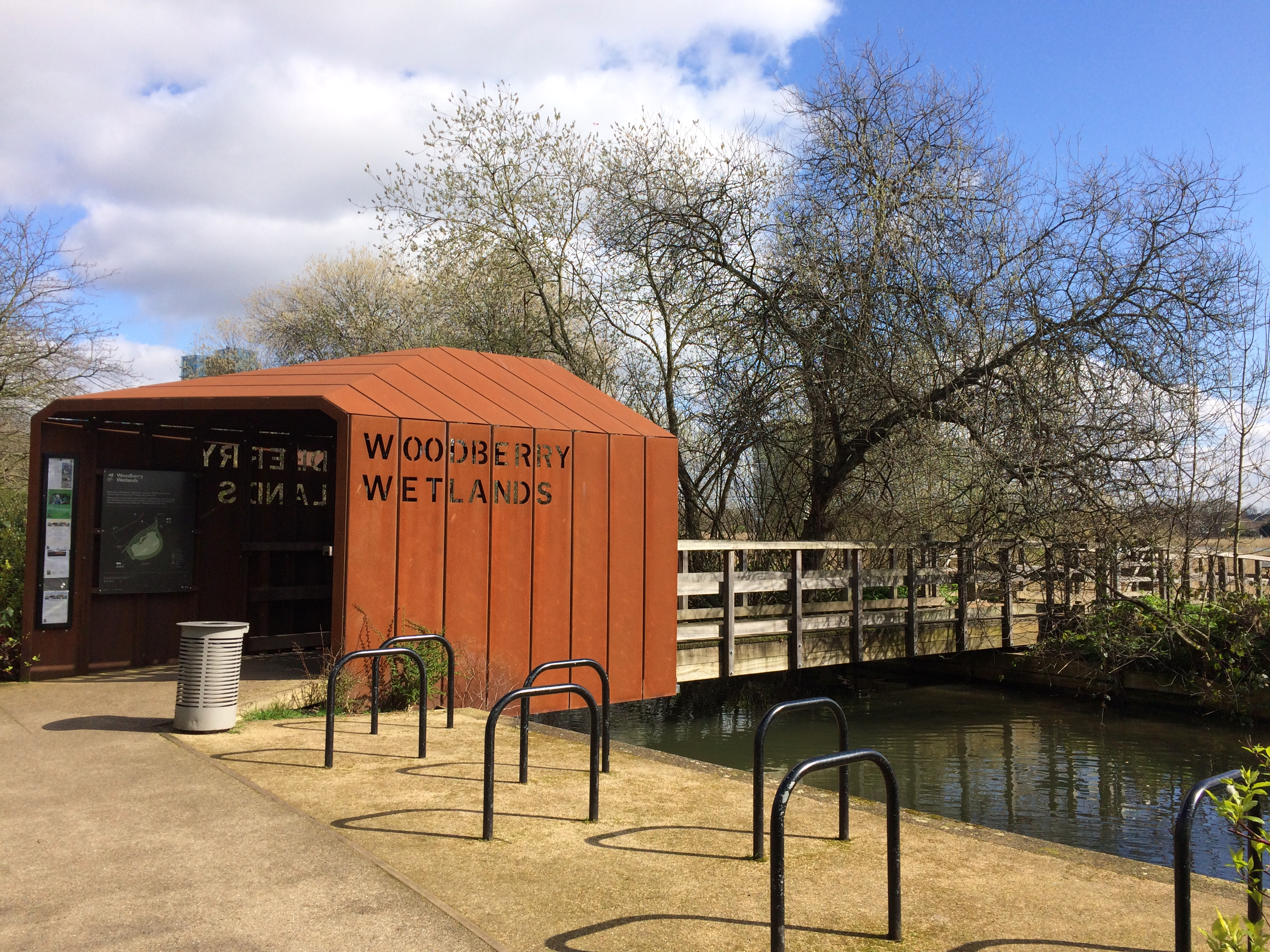
Woodberry Wetlands entrance

Before the 1600s London's water supply was mostly reliant on the River Thames, local streams, wells and springs. King James I authorised the construction of the New River in 1604 to bring clean water from springs in Hertfordshire and Middlesex to London.

Created in 1833, the reservoirs stored water from The New River. The banks of the reservoirs were lined at higher levels with stones taken from London Bridge, then in the course of demolition.

Presently, water is temporarily held at the East Reservoir before processing at Walthamstow Reservoirs. The west reservoir has been converted into a water sports centre.

== Ecology ==
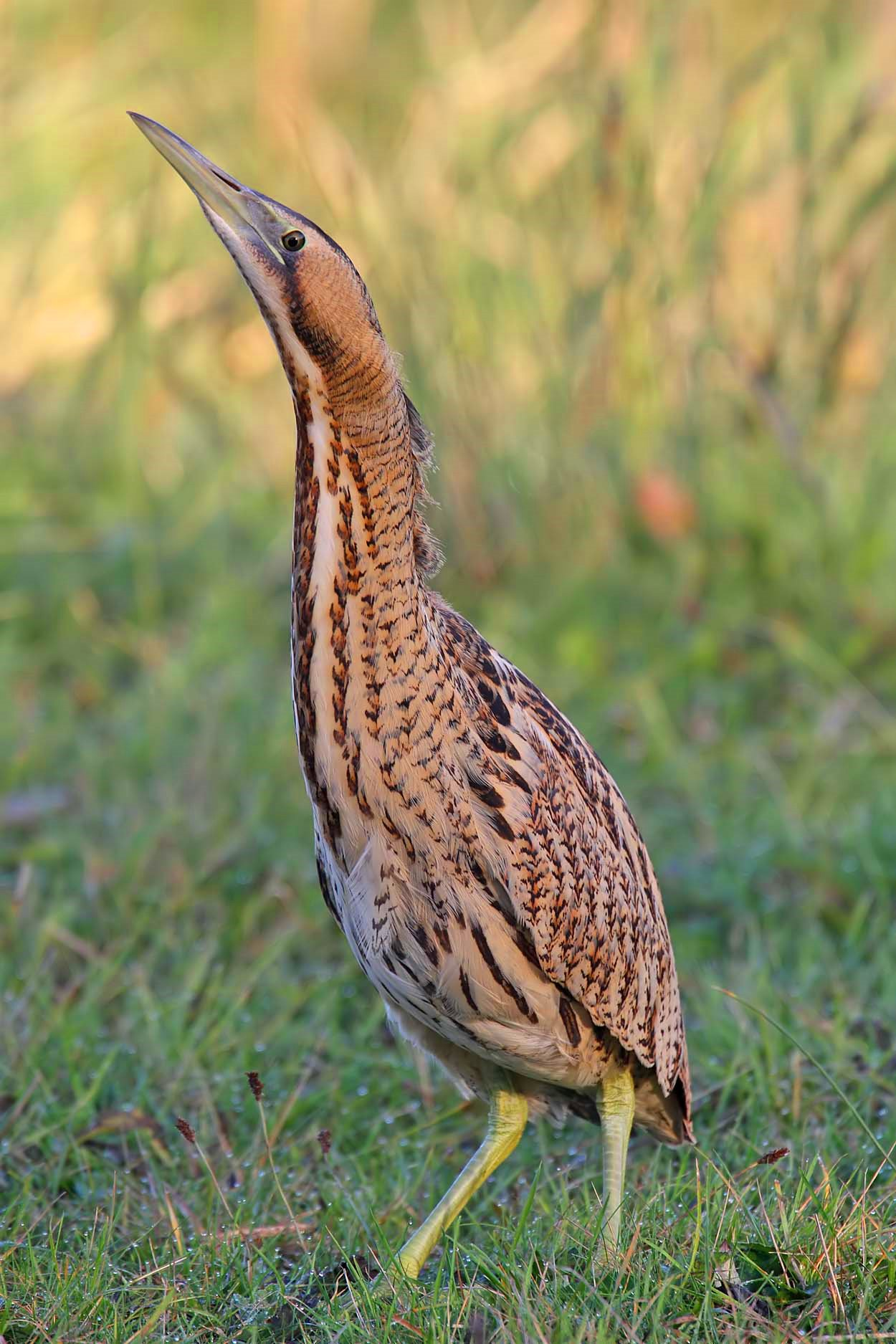
Bittern, a wading bird found in reedbed habitat

Woodberry Wetlands is located close to the Lee Valley and is a resting place for migratory birds that move to and from the Lee Valley Special Protection Area, with waterfowl such as pochard, shoveler and gadwall visiting the site. Grey heron, tufted duck, reed bunting and other wetland birds are also present, along with kingfisher and other species such as damselflies, dragonflies, amphibians and bats.

A significant expansion of the reed beds, organised by London Wildlife Trust, provides increased wildlife habitat with the aim of encouraging more reed bunting and reed warbler to breed at the site, as well as provide additional habitat for overwintering bittern.
