= Bruce Kenrick =

Christian minister and social activist (1920–2007)

Bruce Kenrick in the 1960s.

Rev Bruce Kenrick (18 January 1920 – 15 January 2007) was an English social activist and Minister in the United Reformed Church and the Church of Scotland. He is best known for writing "Come out the Wilderness" and as the founder of British housing organisation Shelter.

== Early life ==
Bruce Kenrick was born in Liverpool and initially trained as an accountant. World War II broke out before he turned 20, and he saw service as a medic in the Gold Coast Defence Force and with paratroopers in Italy. After the war he decided to pursue a career as a doctor. He attended the University of Edinburgh where he switched to divinity, having engaged in missionary work.

== Ministry ==
Kenrick went to work in the East Harlem Protestant parish project, which was attached to Union Theological Seminary in the City of New York. On his return to the UK he was ordained and went to work in Notting Hill, London - then an area marked by racial tension and bad landlords like Peter Rachman.

== Activism ==
In response to the poor housing conditions, Kenrick set up the Notting Hill Housing Trust, which maintained the fabric of the area.The early days were not easy, but the organisation went from strength to strength under Kenrick's leadership. The head office of Notting Hill Genesis, formed as part of a merger of Notting Hill Housing Trust and Genesis Housing Association, still carries the name Bruce Kenrick House. It was out of the desire to put national pressure on local government to improve housing that Shelter was born at St Martin in the Fields in 1966.

After a dispute over the leadership of the organisation with Des Wilson, Kenrick left Shelter. He remained a significant figure on the broad left in the church, and his membership of the Iona Community and work on the example set by the revolution in Cuba helped set the direction of radical Christianity in the UK.

On 30 April 2026, Kenrick was inducted into the Charity Hall of Fame as part of the Class of 2026, described as the "housing reformer who brought the fight against homelessness into the national spotlight."

== Personal life ==
He met his wife Isabel Witte, an historian, while at Edinburgh. Their children included Ann Kenrick, charity leader.

== Bibliography ==
- "The New Humanity", Collins, 1956
- "Come Out the Wilderness", Harper & Brothers, 1962 (US); Fontana, 1965
- "A Man from the Interior - Cuba's Quest", Epworth, 1980
