= Will Kindrick =

American filmmaker

Will Kindrick is an American filmmaker, commercial, music video director who has written and directed works for Ice Cube, Brian Wilson, She & Him, Mates of State, Postino among others. He is also known for his work on the Nick Jr. series Yo Gabba Gabba!.

Kindrick is a graduate of Art Center College of Design in Pasadena, California. While attending Art Center Will created the award-winning 10 episode comedy web series Dead Grandma starring Matt Heder, Beverly Welsh, Shannon Mary Dixon and Jon Heder.
