= Jane Kenrick =

- Born: 20 November 1946; Camberwell, London, England, UK
- Died: 11 August 1988 (aged 41); Cambridge, Cambridgeshire, England, UK

Academic work
- Discipline: Feminism, socialism, ideology of family life

Jane Elizabeth Kenrick (20 November 1946 – 11 August 1988) was an Oxford-educated British academic who specialised in subjects relating to women.

== Career ==
Kenrick was a committed socialist, devoted to many causes, including active support to cleaners at Addenbrooke's Hospital during their strike in opposition to privatisation, in 1984.

== Recognition ==
Kenrick was one of the woman featured in John Berger's TV series, Ways of Seeing (1972) along with Anya Bostock, Eva Figes, Barbara Niven and Carola Moon.

An archive of Kenrick's papers can be found in Lucy Cavendish College, Cambridge.

== See also ==
- Feminism in the United Kingdom
- History of the socialist movement in the United Kingdom

== Bibliography ==
- "Politics and the construction of women as second-class workers", in The dynamics of labor market segmentation (1981), edited by Frank Wilkinson. London: Academic Press.
- As editor: Friendship & The Greek City by Gabriel Herman
