= Daniel Kenrick =

English physician and poet

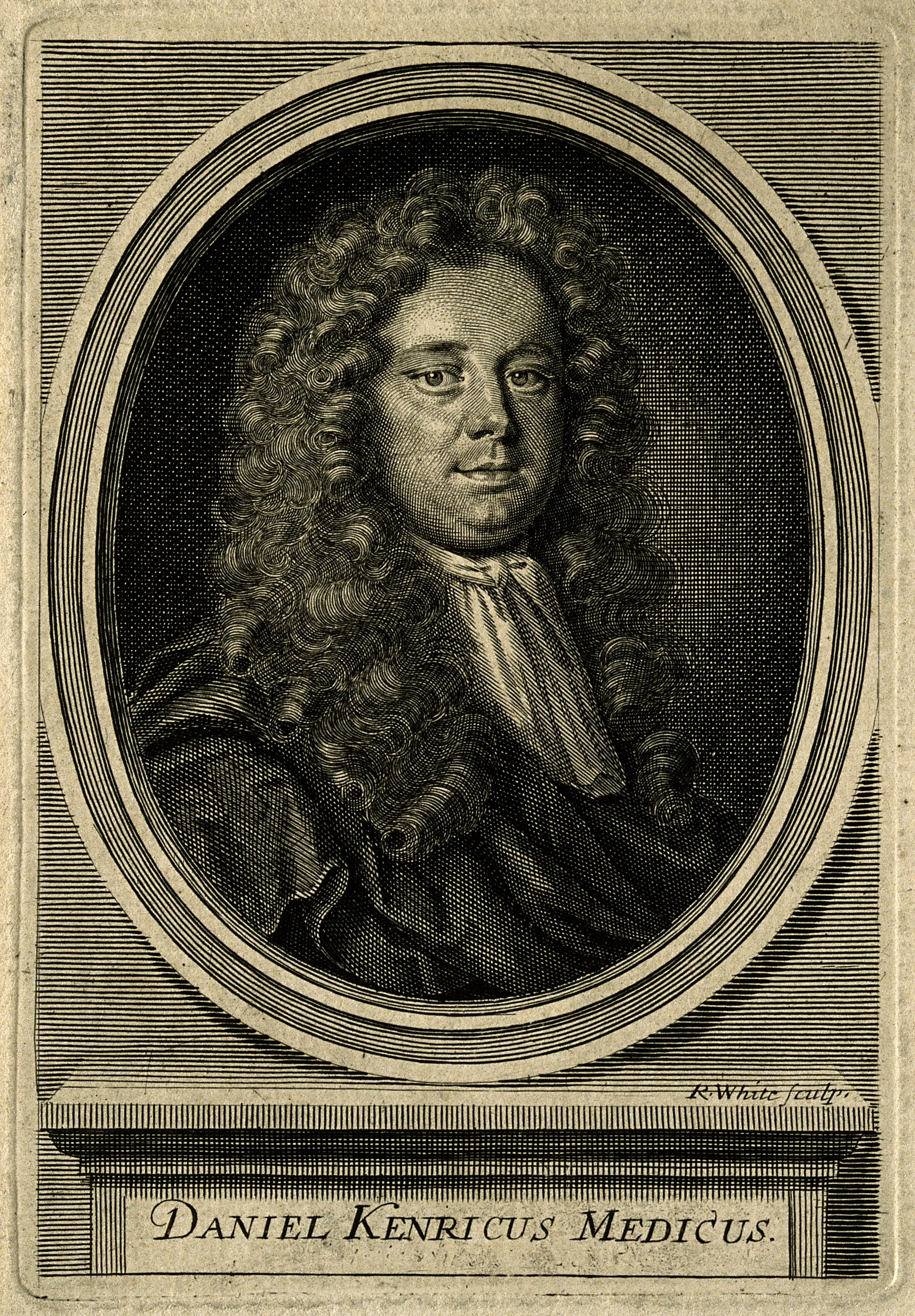
- Occupations: Physician and poet

Daniel Kenrick (fl. 1685), also called Daniel Kendrick, was an English physician and poet.

== Biography ==
Kenrick was the son of Samuel Kenrick of Leigh, Gloucestershire. He was born about 1652, and entered as a servitor at Christ Church, Oxford, on 31 March 1666, whence he proceeded B.A. 1669, and M.A. 1674. At the age of thirty-two, when his portrait was engraved by Robert White, Kenrick was practising as a doctor at his native town of Worcester, and was much esteemed there as ‘a man of wit and a jolly companion.’ Several poems by ‘Dr. Kenrick’ appear in ‘The Grove, or a Collection of Original Poems, by W. Walsh, Dr. J. Donne, Mr. Dryden, Mr. Butler, Sir John Suckling, and other eminent hands,’ London, 1721. Kenrick's ‘talents,’ it is declared in the preface, ‘seem equal in panegyrick, satire, and lyric. There is a fire and sprightliness of thinking which runs through all his copies, and to this perhaps he owed that haste in his writing which made him sometimes negligent of Harmony both in Rimes and Numbers.’ We gather from the same source that Kenrick was on terms of intimacy with Mrs. Behn and Purcell the musician, and that he died before the publication of ‘The Grove’ in 1721. There are some verses signed by Kenrick in the fifth vol. of Dryden's ‘Miscellany Poems,’ entitled ‘Upon a Giant Angling.’ These, however, are said by Granger, ‘on the information of Dr. John Wall,’ to have been freely borrowed from a work called ‘The Mock Romans,’ London, 1653, while in Pratt's ‘Cabinet of Poetry’ (1808) these same lines are assigned to Dr. William King. The preface to ‘The Grove’ declares that Kenrick took degrees in divinity as well as physic. He may therefore be identical with Daniel Kenrick, D.D., who preached the assize sermon at Worcester in 1688.
