= Notting Hill Genesis =

Large English housing association

- Founded: 2018; 8 years ago
- Purpose: Social housing
- Location: London, UK
- Key people: Helen Evans (Interim CEO)
- Website: www.nhg.org.uk

Notting Hill Genesis (NHG) is a housing association formed in April 2018 by the merger of Notting Hill Housing and Genesis Housing Association. Notting Hill Genesis' primary purpose is to work in the community to provide decent and affordable homes for lower-income households.

It is one of the largest housing associations in south east England. It owns around 55,000 properties in London and a further 9,000 in the home counties and East Anglia, housing about 170,000 people.

== History ==
=== Notting Hill Housing Trust ===
Notting Hill Housing (NHH) was a social enterprise and registered charity providing affordable housing for Londoners. In 1963, Bruce Kenrick moved to Notting Hill and was shocked at the poor quality of housing that people were forced to live in. He began a fundraising drive, with the aim to raise enough money to buy one home to house several homeless families. As Michael White has written: "Its first fundraiser was a stall on the Portobello Road market which raised £24. But Kenrick, a man of charismatic energy, which alternated with bouts of sometimes severe depression, learned quickly. Backed by clerical allies such Donald Mason, Geoffrey Ainger and Ken Bartlett, and concerned local people such as Sidney Miller and Pansy Jeffrey, the Trust's first advert – placed in The Guardian – raised £20,000. It was unprecedented." Notting Hill Housing Trust was born, and in its first year it bought five houses and housed 57 people. Within five years, it became a large presence in west London, housing nearly 1,000 people.

John Coward, who joined the Trust in 1965, was the first employee and then the first Chief Executive. When he started, it had five properties; when he retired 21 years later, it was managing almost 8,000. The Trust raised funds from the public to buy dilapidated properties at auction. By renovating these houses to provide decent, affordable rented housing, it meant that some poor residents were not pushed out of the area. It inspired other housing associations, including Circle 33 (today part of Clarion Housing Group), co-founded in 1968 by architects David Levitt and David Bernstein.

Over the years, Notting Hill Housing took over various smaller housing associations, including three in 2009: Presentation, Croydon Peoples and Pathway, which took its housing stock to 25,000.

Housing associations finance acquisitions and major repairs by borrowing, secured on their housing properties. In 2012 NHH borrowed £250 million by a bond issue at a record low interest rate for the sector of 3.78 per cent.

In 2013 NHH commemorated its 50th anniversary with a series of events and activities which involved former and current staff, residents, supporters and sector colleagues.

On 28 April 2014 an agreement was signed with Southwark Council confirming NHH as the development partner for the regeneration of the Aylesbury Estate. The agreement committed the partnership to delivering a master plan for 3,500 new homes; 50% of these would be affordable homes, of which 75% would be for social rent and 25% for shared ownership or equity. A minimum of 30% across all tenures would have three bedrooms or more. Construction of the new homes was due to start in 2016, with the entire regeneration project expected to be finished in 2032.

On 20 July 2017 it was announced that Notting Hill Housing had agreed a merger in principle with Genesis Housing Association The merger was completed on 4 April 2018 to form Notting Hill Genesis.

=== Genesis Housing Association ===
Genesis Housing logo

Genesis Housing Association, known until May 2011 as Genesis Housing Group Ltd, was one of the largest developer housing associations in London. It was formed through the amalgamation of Paddington Churches Housing Association, Pathmeads and Springboard housing associations. In 2017 they announced they would be merging with Notting Hill Housing to form Notting Hill Genesis. The merger was completed in April 2018.

Genesis Housing Association managed around 33,000 homes across London and the south east, providing services to tens of thousands of people. It was formed by a merger in May 2011 of PCHA, Pathmeads and Springboard housing associations. They had for some years been managed as a corporate group, Genesis Housing Group. The group also includes Genesis Community, a charitable foundation, and Genesishomes which provides shared ownership properties.

PCHA was founded over 40 years earlier as Paddington Churches Housing Association, and managed more than 11,500 homes.

Pathmeads was formed in 2001 as a rescue vehicle for West Hampstead Housing Association, which had overextended its temporary housing operation. In 2011 it had over 21,000 managed homes.

Springboard provided management services to around 6,000 homes and another rescued association, St Matthew Housing. Eastwards Trust was also a subsidiary of Springboard.

==== Management ====
Neil Hadden was appointed as Chief Executive in 2009. He succeeded Anu Vedi, who had led the group for ten years, through its growth from 10,000 to over 38,000 homes.

The current Chairman of the Board of Trustees is Dipesh Shah, who has had a diverse executive career in the energy sector. He replaced Charles Gurassa in 2017.

==== Properties managed ====
As of 2016, stock owned and managed totals 32,139. The highest proportions of stock were based in the London boroughs of Barnet, Brent, Camden and the City of Westminster.

==== Finances ====
From 2005 to 2007, Genesis spent £200 million on its land bank for new developments. From 2008 to 2010, during the Great Recession, Genesis wrote off around £6 million from asset values in its balance sheet each year, but in 2011 this entry in its accounts increased to £20 million – a third of the total impairment booked by all housing associations in the year.

Genesis strengthened its financial position by raising its first own-name bond issue for £200 million in 2010. It rationalised its asset holdings, selling its 40% interest in a portfolio of 1,650 properties in central London to Grainger plc for £15m in 2011.

In August 2015, Genesis controversially announced that it would no longer be building homes for social rent and would bring the rents of its existing stock into line with affordable and market rental rates as they become vacant.

==== Awards ====
Genesis won the top prize for social housing at the Daily Telegraph British Homes Awards 2011 for the first phase of new homes at Woodberry Down.

== Developments ==
Genesis owned a 3.4 hectares (8.4 acres) site in Chelmsford, Essex, formerly the Central Campus of Anglia Ruskin University. The group purchased it from Countryside Properties in 2007. The developer had obtained planning permission for 700 homes in 2003. Genesis prepared a revised plan in 2011 for about 600 homes, along with new shops and offices. Some of the old buildings were retained including the 1823 listed former Quaker meeting house Anne Knight House, and the Frederic Chancellor Building, which was built in 1904–05 as a museum and art school.

Genesis worked with Hackney Borough Council on the redevelopment of Woodberry Down, one of the largest urban regeneration projects in the UK.

Genesis was the lead housing association developer on Grahame Park, a large-scale regeneration project in Colindale, north west London, in partnership with Barnet London Borough Council and Countryside Properties. The scheme is one of the largest self-funded projects in Europe and will see the construction of around 3000 new homes, as well as shops, gardens, community and health facilities, new parks, and a civic hub.

In December 2016, it was confirmed that Genesis would be a partner on the Oaklands development, the first major scheme to be delivered as part of the regeneration of Old Oak Common in London. They aimed to deliver a £175m mixed-use residential development of over 600 homes, working with Queens Park Rangers football club.
