= History of Harringay (prehistory–1750) =

Harringay, the modern-day northern district of London, emerged from the mist of prehistory as a thickly forested area of southern England. By 1750, most of the forest had been cleared for agriculture, although settlement was still sparse.

== Prehistory to Domesday ==
About 60 million years ago, the area lay on a seabed of clay 180 metres deep underwater. Once Britain's landmass emerged from beneath the water, the area was part of the hinterland of the swamps and marshes of the Thames. Plenty of fossil evidence has been discovered that shows mammoths, hippos, hyenas, and rhinoceroses once roamed thereabouts. In the Ice Age, Harringay was at the edge of a huge glacial mass that reached as far south as Muswell Hill. There is evidence of both Stone Age and Bronze Age activity in the immediate vicinity; Stone Age implements, estimated as 200,000 years old, were unearthed in the Finsbury Park Area and near Stoke Newington. A 4,000-year-old bronze dagger, now in the possession of the British Museum, was found in Hornsey.

Before the Romans' arrival, Harringay was part of a large area covering Essex and Middlesex , which was home to a Celtic tribe called Trinobantes. Led by Imanuentius at the time of the Roman invasion, they fought with the Iceni tribe under Boudica against the Romans in AD61. The two tribes lost, sustaining casualties in excess of 80,000. Whatever their record in battle, they were a well-organised society. On his arrival, Julius Caesar found an 'elaborate and well-organised tribal civilisation. Its population was exceedingly large, and the ground thickly studded with homesteads.

The Roman invasion of Britain started in the middle of the 1st century BC and drew Harringay into the wider world. With the Romans' main settlement just 5 miles to the south, there is good evidence that Green Lanes was established a major road to the north in Roman times. Of direct archaeological evidence of settlement in the vicinity at the time there is little. The only significant find was a hoard of 3rd and 4th century gold coins found between Hornsey and Muswell Hill in 1928.

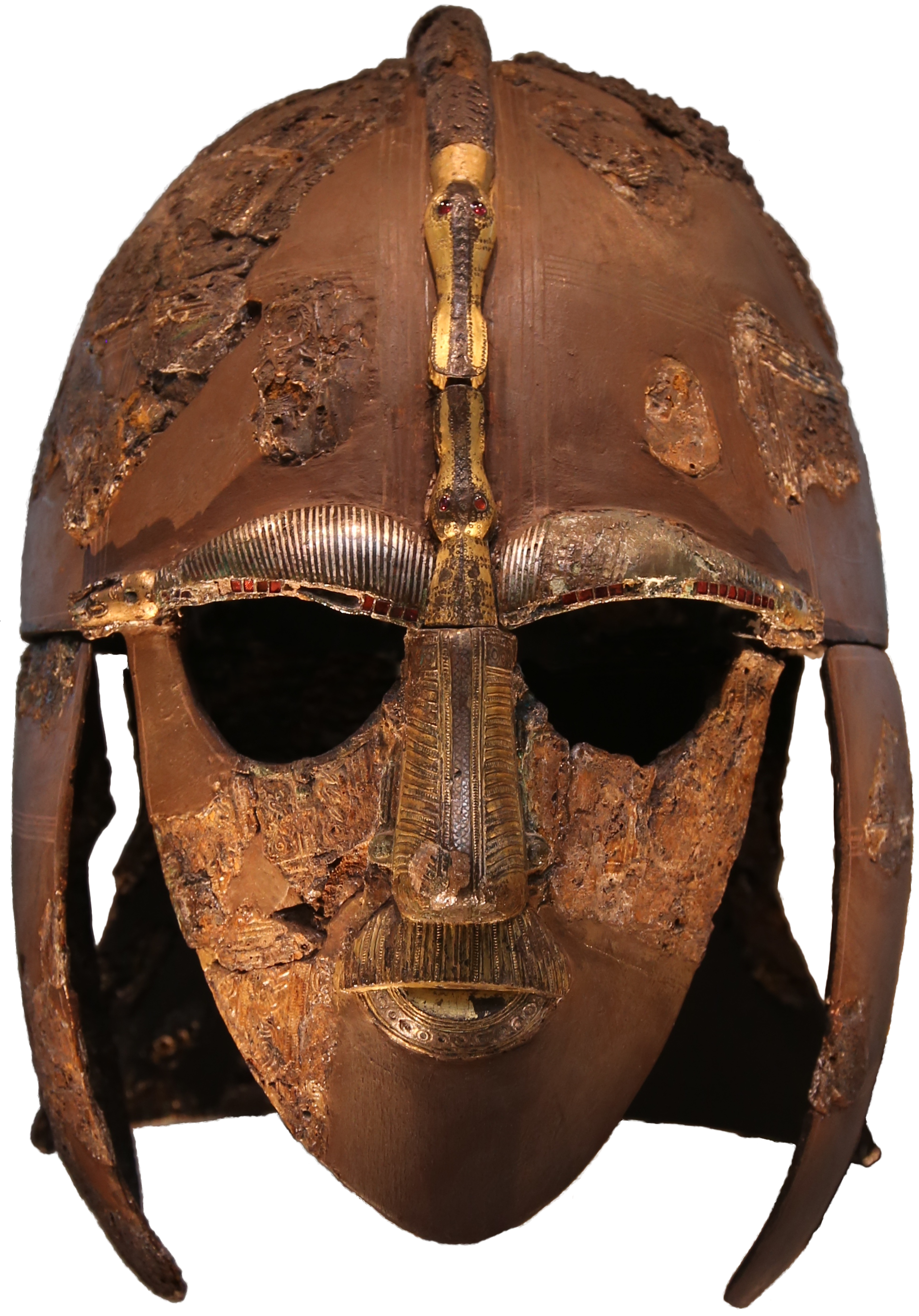
Anglo Saxon helmet probably belonging to King Raedwald of East Anglia

The 5th and 6th centuries saw the Saxon invasions and, it is likely, the arrival of Haering, the chieftain whose name still lives on today in local placenames. Haering's settlement at Harringay can be visualised as “a clearing which he made, protected by a hedge in a wild and wooded undulating district, part of the forest in the province of Middlesex”. In 604, when the Diocese of London was refounded, the area came under the Kingdom of Essex. One hundred years later, when the 'province of Middlesex' is first recorded, it came under the Kingdom of Mercia, the dominant kingdom of Britain for many years. For a short period, from 874–886, it was taken during the Viking raids and was subject to Danish rule until it was reconquered by King Alfred.

It was at this time that the western part of modern Harringay became part of the Hundred of Ossulstone and that its parochial and manorial history was established. The area to the east became part of the neighbouring Hundred of Edmonton.

At the time of Domesday, the western area was within the Manor of Harengheie and part of the Bishop of London's principal Manor of Stepney. The eastern part was within the Manor of Tottenham held by Waltheof II, Earl of Northumbria, the last of the great Anglo-Saxon Earls.

== Domesday to 1750 ==
Note: To enable distinction between two separate entities in this section. Hornsey is used when referring to the lands of Harringay Manor (a.k.a. Hornsey Manor). Harringay is used in reference to the area covered by present-day Harringay Town.

=== Characteristics of the landscape and land use ===
At the dawn of the post-Conquest period, Harringay was very probably still mostly thickly wooded, part of a huge forest that still covered most of Middlesex. The land to the west of Harringay bordered on the Bishop of London's hunting grounds of Great Hornsey Park and retained their natural state well into the middle of this period. Amongst those who hunted in the park was the keen hunter Henry VIII.

To the east of the Great Park the forests were gradually pushed back through the Middle Ages and the land was being put to agricultural use. In 1390 forest covered half of the total area of Hornsey. By the middle of the seventeenth century, farmland covered two-thirds. By the fifteenth century the landscape of Harringay was dominated by pasture, but there were some fields given over to cereal crops and a little woodland remained. An inspection of Hornsey Manor by the King's reeve in 1283 notes wages for herdsmen and ploughmen and recorded activities including ploughing, sowing winnowing chaff and spreading clay. The value of oats and wheat were noted and animals such as pigs, plough-oxen, horses, cattle listed. Some five hundred years later Rocque's map of 1745 noted the particular agricultural uses to which the land had been set. These may well have been established hundreds of years before. His maps show that most of the lands in the west of modern-day Harringay were given over to pasture; those in the east, with the exception of a strip along Green Lanes, were in arable use. Milne's land use map of Middlesex, drawn up in 1800 shows half this arable land had become pasture over the preceding fifty years.

At the turn of the 17th century then, it is possible with some accuracy to picture Harringay. The slopes of 'Harringay Park' were pastureland cross-hatched with hedgerows, dotted with trees and copses and most likely scattered with livestock. Bordering these lands and running for a good part of the length along the western side of Harringay's Green Lanes was open common land known as 'Beans Green'. North of that was the open common land of 'Ducketts Common', which survives today. Across the muddy roadway in the northern portion of East Harringay lay more pasture. The southern portion was fringed with yet more pasture, but beyond on most of the land of East Harringay that lay cultivated fields, probably sown with oats. Meandering down the hill roughly beneath present-day Effingham and Fairfax Roads ran Stonebridge Brook; reaching Green Lanes, it followed the road south for a way, then continued east running just to the north of St Ann's Road. Further south, where the Sainsbury's development is today, rose a second brook, Hermitage Brook, snaking northeast towards the River Lea. Beyond, on a knoll to the southwest, in the southern part of today's Finsbury Park, stood one of the last remnants of the forests, Hornsey Wood which survived throughout the period.

=== Settlement ===
The predominance of pasture rather than arable farming in this area of Middlesex kept it thinly populated, with settlement mainly confined to a few villages and hamlets. Records show little settlement in Harringay during this period. By the end of the eighteenth century, the villages of Hornsey, Crouch End and Muswell Hill had been established. To the north and northwest lay the hamlets of Wood Green and West Green; to the South, Stoke Newington. But, only three buildings were recorded in all of Harringay up till nearly the end of the eighteenth century. On the site where Harringay House was to be built in 1792 (at the top of the hill between present-day Hewitt and Allison Roads) a fine Tudor mansion reputedly stood The last owner of the land, Ida Cozens, sold it in 1789 to Edward Gray, a linen draper of Cornhill. The only known occupants of the house and the last people to live in it were the Cozens family. The house itself was apparently pulled down in 1750. Further to the east, behind where Warwick Road is today, opposite the end of Kimberley Gardens, was 'Hangers Barne'. The first record of the building is on Dorset's 1619 map. However, it may have been constructed many years earlier. Although it is not clear whether it was a house or purely an agricultural building, the fact that it is marked and named on the 1619 map suggests the former. It was most likely associated with the great oat fields all around it. Tottenham Manor records also describe a hermitage in the vicinity. Although the precise location is uncertain, the records locate it between (present-day) St. Ann's Road and the manor boundary (where Hermitage Road is today). Evidence suggests that it stood just to the South of the site of today's Sainsbury's; the name of Hermitage Road echoes its past purpose.

On the southern edge of Brown's Wood (subsequently Hornsey Wood), within the present-day boundaries of Finsbury Park, there was a house called Copt Hall, which had been the manor house for the Manor of Brownswood. It contained a hall, parlour, kitchen, cellar, and two chambers, besides outbuildings. First mentioned in records in 1649, the building was unoccupied by 1664. 18th-century records suggest that it subsequently became a small roadside public house.

=== Other development ===
Whilst there was little building associated with settlement, one major engineering project in the early 17th century did impact the area. Between 1609 and 1613, Sir Hugh Myddleton constructed the New River. This ambitious project was designed to bring fresh water from Hertfordshire into London. Many landowners along its 38-mile length objected to its construction, fearing amongst other things, a drop in land value. In its early form, some of the stretch which snaked through Harringay was constructed in wooden aqueducts lined with lead and supported by strong timbers and brick piers. Improvements in canal making in the 18th century led to these sections being replaced with clay-banked canals.

=== Land ownership ===
The ownership of the land in Harringay through this period followed typical, but different patterns in the eastern and western portions. At the beginning of the period, the land on both sides of Green Lanes was owned by a Lord of the manor under the system of Manorialism. Whilst land ownership remained in relatively few hands across the period, its tenure changed many times through royal seizure and various forms of Land tenure , including subinfeudation, freehold and copyhold.

Since the Church was the largest landholder in the country, it is not surprising that it figured large in the ownership of Harringay's lands. Most of the western part of Harringay was part of the Bishop of London's Manor of Hornsey. Through subinfeudation, 'Fernfields' or 'Fernefelde' Manor was created from part of the southwestern part of that manor. Though its precise boundaries are unknown, records show that it included much of northern part of western Harringay. Soon after the conquest Fernefelde was granted to the Knights Templar to support their crusades in the Holy Lands. Thereafter it passed through other holy orders until by the mid-sixteenth century it was granted to one Thomas Fisher. By the end of the 18th century, some of the manor formed part of Edward Gray's Harringay Park Estate.

The Harringay lands directly to the south of Fernfields, roughly from the line of Duckett Road today and south beyond present-day Seven Sisters Road were part of the Manor of Brownswood. This was another subinfeudated manor of Hornsey. Initially owned by a prebend in St Paul's Cathedral, by 1569 the manor had been passed to John Harrington. Thereafter, it changed hands a number of times – much of it eventually to become in modern times Finsbury Park or part of western Harringay.

To the east of Green Lanes, the lands were originally part of Tottenham Manor. Seized from Waltheof II by William the Conqueror, the Manor was held for about for 150 years to the end of the 13th century by the Kings of Scotland. Death and feuding within that great family led to subdivision of the manor into three smaller manors in 1254. Harringay lands were within a manor called Pembrokes. The lands of this manor stretched from the southern boundary of Tottenham Manor, near Hermitage Road today, north to West Green and east to Tottenham High Road. The three parts of Tottenham were reunited by John Gedney in the early 15th century but were still often referred to by the names they took on during the period of manorial division. As with western Harringay, the Church was a holder of large areas of land in Tottenham. This included a very large plot of land which ran from St Ann's Road in the north to Hermitage Road in the south and was roughly bounded by Green Lanes and Hermitage Road from east to west. This land was granted to the Hospitaliers of St John's of Jerusalem shortly after the Norman Conquest. The income from the land would have initially supported their hospital in the Holy Land, tending for the casualties of the crusades and pilgrims to the Holy Land. With Henry VIII's dissolution of the monasteries in the mid-sixteenth century, the land passed to the Crown. In the Dorset map of 1619, the land consisted of eleven fields. These fields are probably the area referred to in contemporary documents as the 'Great Hanger' Sold by the Crown as farm land, it is known that at least some of this land became part of St John's Farm. Of the southern part of this land, it is known that some was retained in public ownership until it was developed in relatively recent times - rating records show some of the southern area as common land owned by the Parish and Manor of Tottenham up to the late nineteenth century.

The land along Green Lanes to the north of St. Ann's Road, was agricultural and, in 1619, was in the ownership of a certain J. Bolton. The triangle of land between the current St. Ann's and Salisbury Roads was known as 'Hales Field'. (Salisbury Road was not laid out till the late 19th century, however).

=== Communications ===
Green Lanes had been established long before Domesday. In 1710 an Act of Parliament authorised the introduction of a turnpike on the road at Hornsey, although tolls were not levied until 1739. The Stamford Hill and Green Lanes Turnpike Trust finally erected a toll gate on Green Lanes by Duckett's Common, near Turnpike Lane in 1765. For the next 27 years this was the only tollgate on Green Lanes, at which time the Manor House toll gate was set up, along with others outside of the Harringay area. The other main road through Harringay was along the route of present-day St Ann's Road. Known for most of this period as Chisley Lane, it joined Green Lanes, Harringay to another of the great northbound roads out of London – Ermine Street or Tottenham High Road. Chisley Lane was a favoured haunt of the famous highwayman Dick Turpin. One further route developed prior to 1750 and is marked on Rocque's map of 1754. This shows a trackway leading from Hornsey to Hornseywood House. Some of this track follows the course of today's Wightman Road.

=== Historical highlights ===
Whilst no major historical events can be traced with any certainty to Harringay lands, several events were recorded in Harringay Park. This could be a reference to Harringay lands or, perhaps more likely, to the Great Hornsey Park around Highgate.

- 1386 – The Duke of Gloucester, the Earls of Warwick, Arundel, and other nobles, gathered in Harringay Park to oppose King Richard.
- 1388 – During the reign of King Henry V the Lollards gathered in Harringay Park to rebel against the King. However, they were slaughtered by Henry's forces before they launched their attack.
- 1483 – When short-lived Edward V was brought to London, after his father's death, the Lord Mayor of London and 500 citizens met him in Harringay Park, and accompanied him into London.
- 1485 – Henry VII was met in Harringay Park on his return from victory and conducted into London in celebration.

== See also ==
- Parish of Hornsey for the local government unit of which Harringay was part from the 17th century to 1867.
- British Agricultural Revolution for additional information on land use through this period and the Agricultural Revolution
