= The Devil Tavern =

Fleet Street hostelry

Coordinates: 51.5137°N 0.1117°W

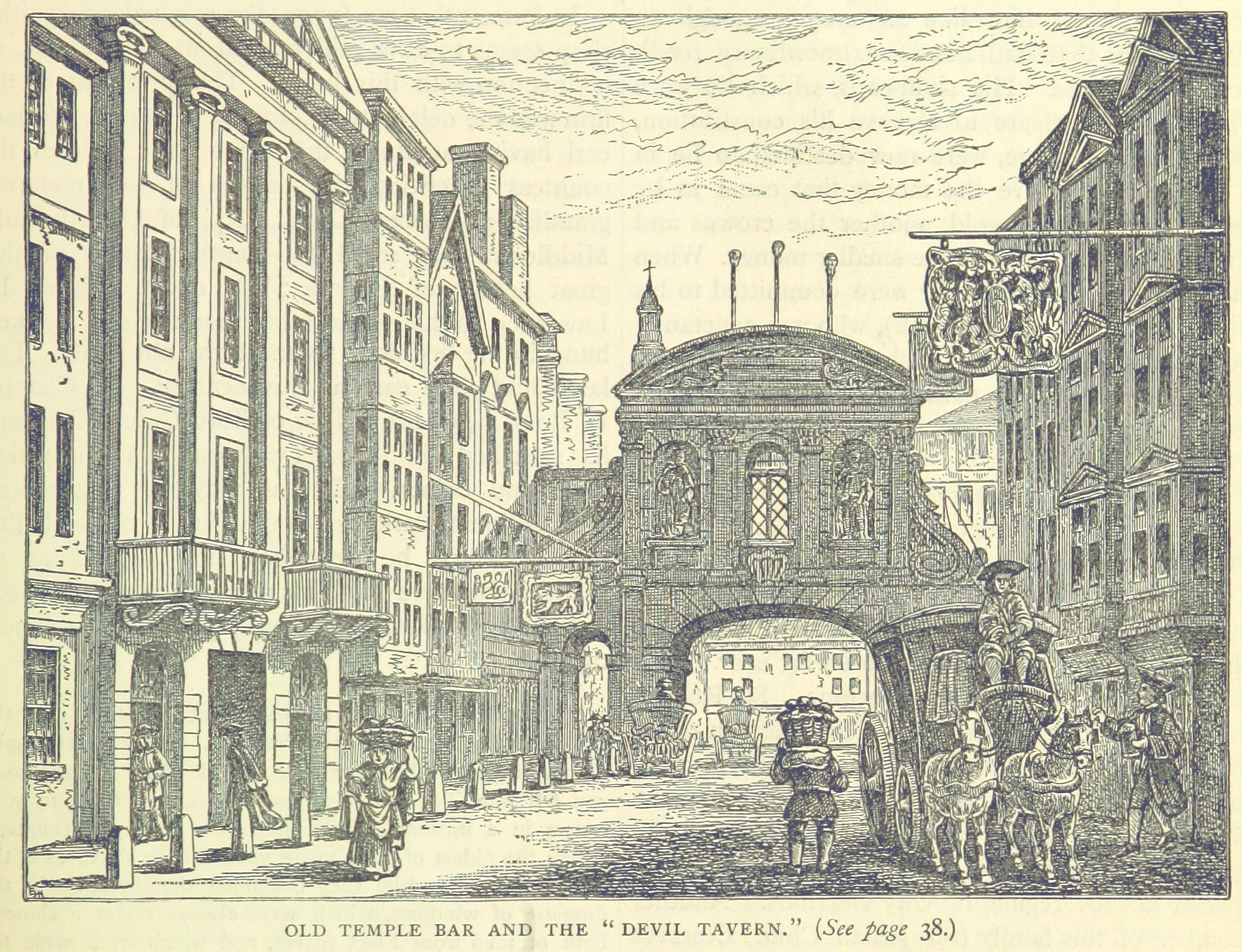
1873 drawing of "Old Temple Bar and the Devil Tavern"

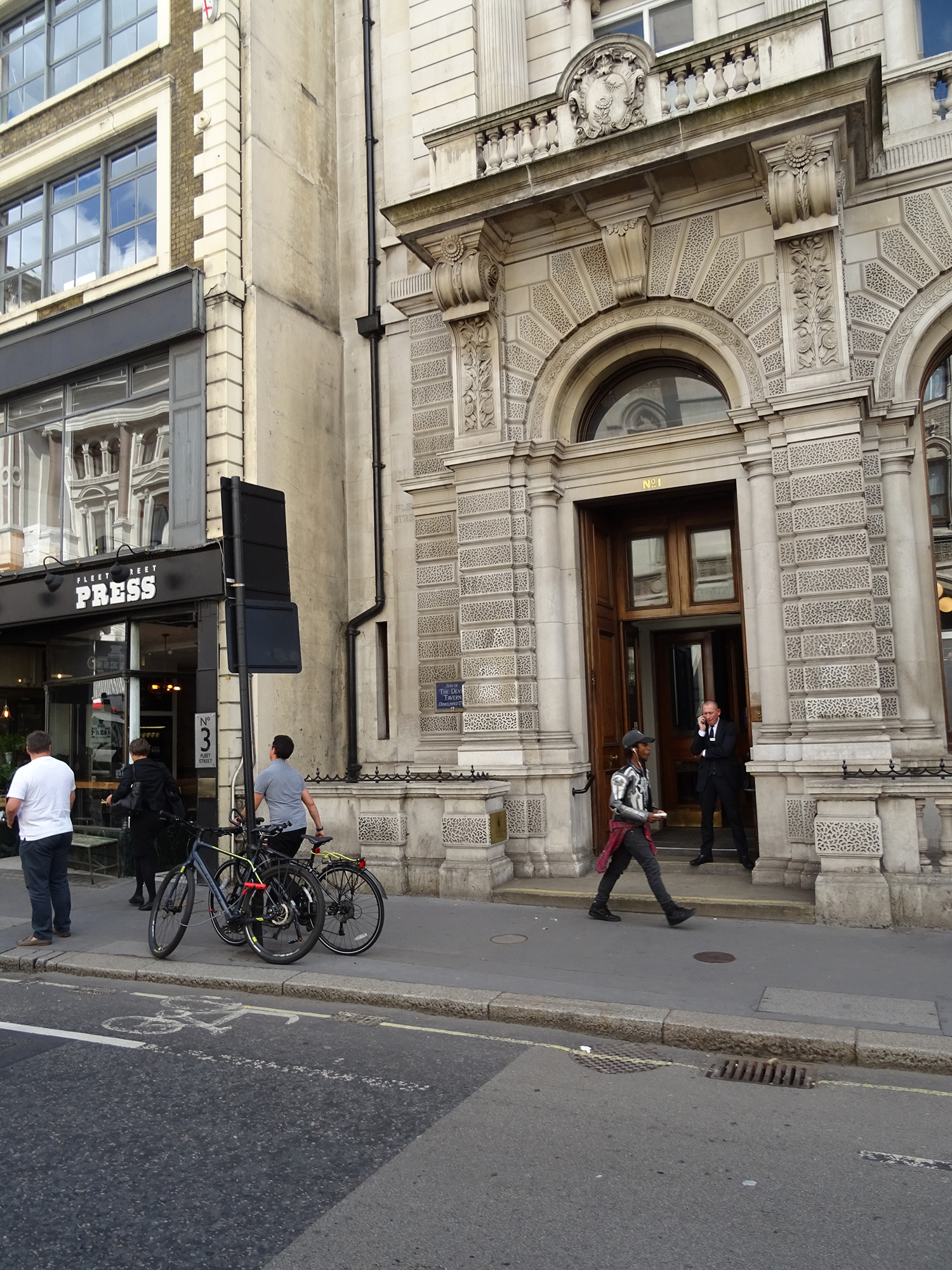
The site of the Devil Tavern is marked with a blue plaque (visible in the centre of this image) on the wall of 1 Fleet Street

The Devil Tavern, whose full sign was The Devil and Saint Dunstan, was a tavern at number 2, Fleet Street in London, near the Temple Bar. It existed from the reign of James I (1603–25) until it was demolished in 1787 by Child & Co. to expand their banking premises. The site is commemorated by a City of London blue plaque reading "Site of the Devil Tavern demolished 1787".

The tavern was opposite the church of Saint Dunstan, and its sign depicted the Devil tweaking Saint Dunstan's nose.
