= Frederick George Hilton Price =

English antiquarian and banker

Frederick George Hilton Price (20 August 1842 – 14 March 1909) was an English banker, antiquarian, archaeologist and geologist. He accumulated a large and diverse collection of antiquities, and he was an active member of many learned societies.

== Life ==
Hilton Price was born in Dalston, London in 1842, the eldest of seven children of Frederick William Price (died 1888) and his wife Louisa Tinson; his father was from 1867 a partner and in 1874 senior acting partner in the banking firm Child & Co.

He received the name "Hilton" in honour of an uncle; although it was not officially a surname, he was known as Mr Hilton Price. He was educated at Crawford College, Maidenhead, and entered Child's Bank in 1860, where he became in 1887 a partner and from 1901 senior acting partner, retaining the position until his death. Much of his early leisure was devoted to the history of Child's Bank, and in 1875 he published Temple Bar, or some Account of Ye Marygold, No. 1 Fleet Street (2nd edition 1902), where Child's Bank had been established in the seventeenth century. In 1877 he brought out A Handbook of London Bankers (enlarged edition 1890–1). He was a member of the Council of the Bankers' Institute and of the Central Bankers' Association.

He married in 1867 Christina, daughter of William Bailey of Oaken, Staffordshire; they had one son and one daughter.

=== Archaeology ===
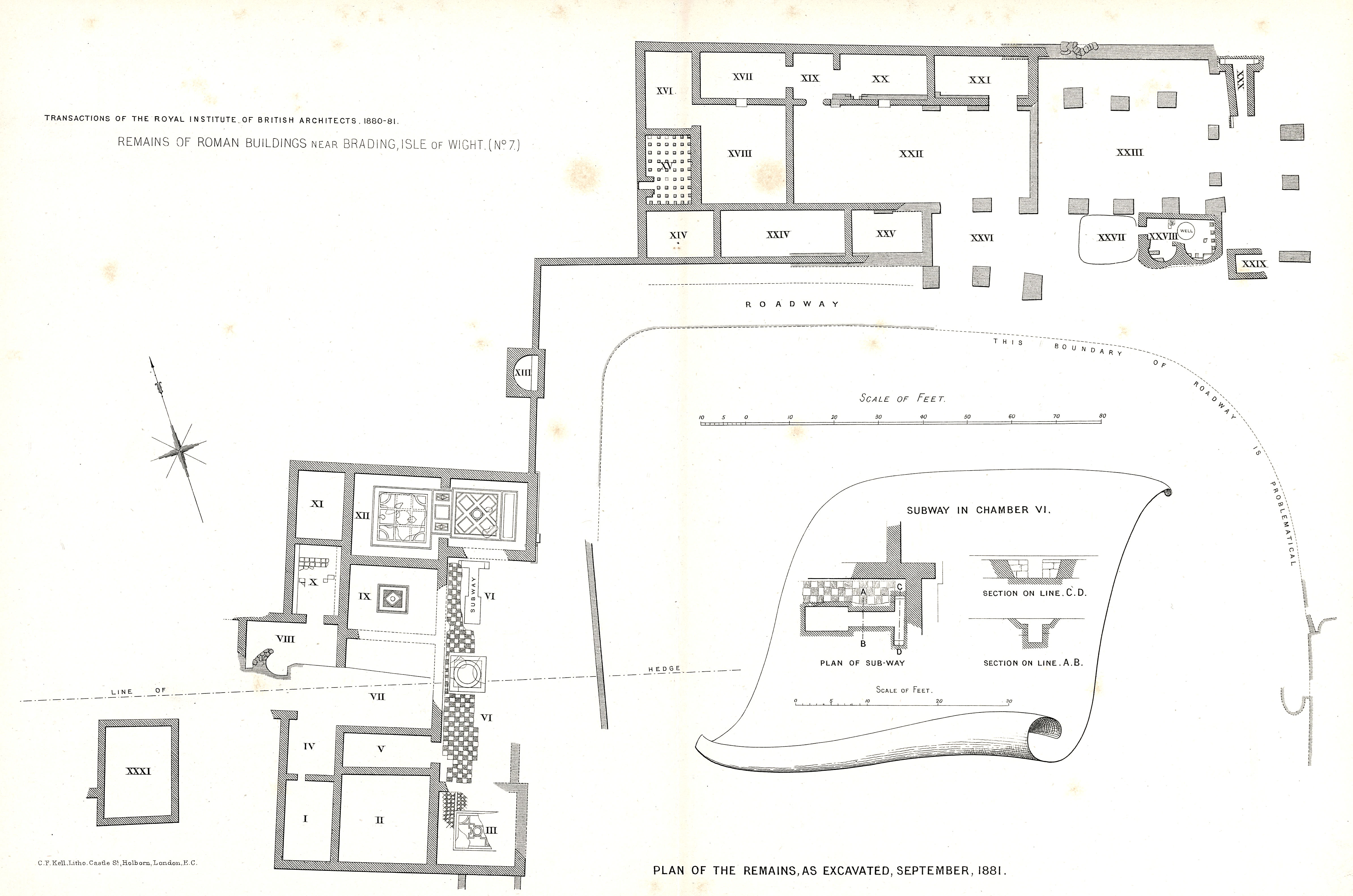
Plan of the Roman villa at Brading, as excavated in 1881. Illustration in A description of the remains of Roman buildings at Morton, near Brading, Isle of Wight by John E. Price F.S.A. and F. G. Hilton Price.

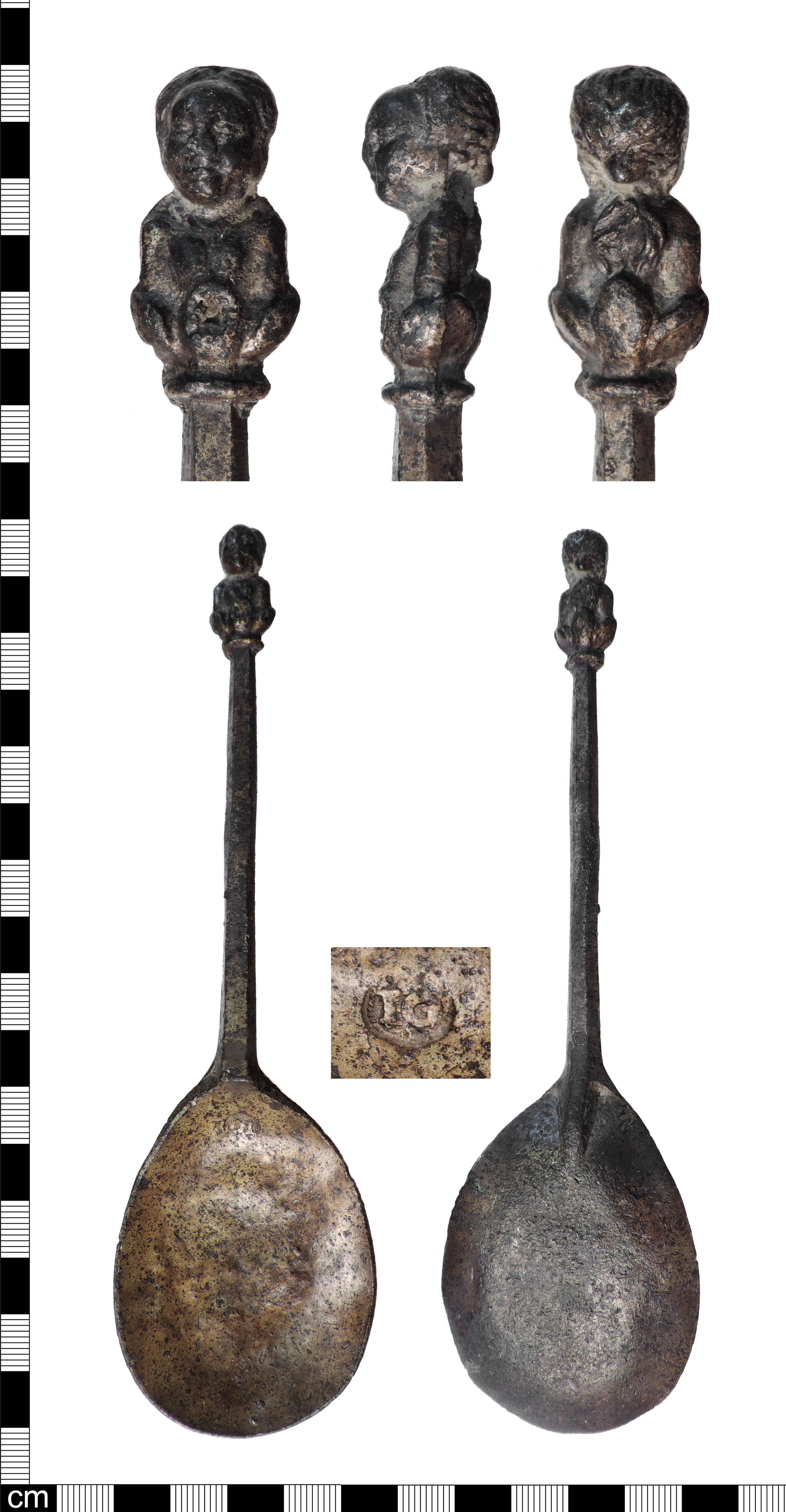
A post-medieval lead alloy "maidenhead" spoon dating to the 16th century. Illustration in Old Base Metal Spoons (1908)

Price's life was mainly devoted to archaeology. Always keenly interested in the prehistoric as well as historic annals of London, he formed a collection of antiquities of the stone and Bronze Ages, of the Roman period, of Samian ware vessels imported during the first and second centuries from the south of France, English pottery ranging from the Norman times down to the last century, tiles, pewter vessels and plates, medieval ink-horns, coins, tokens (many from the burial pits on the site of Christ's Hospital), and so forth; the whole of his collection was secured to form in 1911 the nucleus of the London Museum at Kensington Palace (reported in The Times, 25 March 1911).

Excavations at home and abroad had a great fascination for Price. He took a leading part in the excavation of the Roman villa at Brading in the Isle of Wight, the remains of which were by his exertions kept open to the public for some time, and on which, in conjunction with John E. Price, he read a paper before the Royal Institute of British Architects in December 1880 (printed in the Transactions of that society, 1880–1, pp. 125 seq.). On the excavations at Silchester or Calleva Atrebatum (of the research fund of which he was treasurer) he read a paper at the Society of Antiquaries on 11 February 1886 (printed in Archæologia, 1. 263–280).

At the same time he actively engaged in studying and collecting Egyptian antiquities. In 1886 he described a portion of his collection in the Proceedings of the Society of Biblical Archaeology; a large selection from his collection was exhibited at the Burlington Fine Arts Club in 1895, and two years later he published an elaborate Catalogue of his Egyptian antiquities, which was followed in 1908 by a supplement.

=== Writings and learned societies ===
He collected fossils, particularly of the Gault formation at Folkestone, about which he wrote a number of articles; he was elected fellow of the Geological Society in 1872. He was a voluminous contributor to the Transactions and Proceedings of most of the societies and institutions to which he belonged. A valuable series of illustrated papers on Signs of Old London appeared in the succeeding issues of the London Topographical Record (ii.-v.).

He edited Sketches of Life and Sport in S.E. Africa (1870), and wrote The Signs of Old Lombard Street (1887; revised edition 1902) and Old Base Metal Spoons (1908).

Price was deeply interested in the Society of Antiquaries, of which he became a member in 1882. He was elected director in 1894, retaining the post until his death. In 1905 he was elected president of the Egypt Exploration Fund, which he joined in 1885. He was also a fellow of the Royal Geographical Society; vice president and treasurer of the Anthropological Institute; president of the London Topographical Society; treasurer of the Geologists' Association; fellow and vice president of the Zoological Society of London; fellow and vice president of the Royal Numismatic Society; and council member and vice president of the Society of Biblical Archaeology.

== His estate ==
He died in Cannes on 14 March 1909, after an operation, and was buried at Finchley, in the next grave to his father; his wife survived him. He bequeathed £100 to the Society of Antiquaries for the Research Fund. His books, coins, old spoons, and miscellaneous objects of art and virtu fetched at auction (1909–1911) the sum of £2606 10s. 6d. His Egyptian collection realised £12,040 8s. 6d. at Sotheby's on 12–21 July 1911 (see The Times, 6 June 1911). The same firm sold his coins on 17–19 May 1909 and 7–8 April 1910, 575 lots realising £2309 9s.
