= History of Harringay =

History of the London district of Harringay

The history of Harringay tells the story of the development of the district of London five miles from its centre, affected by, but not always part of, the great city's history.

== Toponymy ==
It is very probable that the name Harringay has its origin in the Saxon period, most likely derived from the name of a Saxon person, probably a local chieftain, called Hering – Heringes-hege in Old English means the enclosure of "Hering". The earliest written form was Harenhg in about 1195. It gave rise to the names Harringay (the district of London), the London Borough of Haringey, and Hornsey (a nearby district of London). Its development into these three forms was complex and included at least 156 variations. Since the history of Hornsey is mostly common with that of present-day Harringay and the etymology is shared, both are covered in this section. The name of the London Borough of Haringey is included to explain spelling differences.

In 1243, the name was recorded as Haringesheye, an intermediate form between the Saxon Heringes-hege and its three present-day forms. With the second ‘g’ pronounced as ‘y’ in Old English, it can be seen how close the two versions were. In 1371 Haryngeay was recorded. The earliest date for Haringey was 1387, or possibly as early as 1294. In either case, it the oldest of the three present-day forms. The variant that became Hornsey developed the addition of an 's' in the middle with the use of Harnsey, recorded in 1392, and Hornsey appeared in 1525. Haryngay appeared in 1393 and Harringay in 1569.

Until the close of the eighteenth century all variants referred to the same area, around present-day Harringay and Hornsey, but from the late Tudor period Hornsey took precedence in common usage: Harringay survived more as a legal entity and in the records of the Manor of Harringay.

The building of the large mansion of Harringay House in 1792 at the top of the hill between present-day Hewitt and Allison Roads saw the divergence of meaning of the names. Hornsey referred to the present-day district and subsequently the parish and Middlesex borough; Harringay to the house, its surrounding park and finally the present-day district, and continued as the common name in manorial records.

Whilst the early residents of Harringay continued to use that name, in official documents from the early twentieth century the Borough of Hornsey referred to it as Haringey, which became the name of the London Borough of Haringey, created in 1964 when the Boroughs of Hornsey, Wood Green and Tottenham merged. A letter from a council officer in 1983 said, "When Tottenham and Hornsey were joined to form the new borough in 1964, the choice of name rested with a special panel which, after public consultation, opted for one of the spellings of the modern Borough of Hornsey. We are not aware of the reasons for that choice". Pupils in local schools at the time were taught that the new borough's name should be pronounced with the same ending as Finchley, Hackney and Hornsey.

== Prehistory to 1750 ==
In the Ice Age, Harringay was at the edge of a huge glacial mass that reached as far south as Muswell Hill. There is evidence of both Stone Age and Bronze Age activity in the immediate vicinity. In the 5th and 6th centuries the Saxon invasions brought Haering, the chieftain whose name still lives on today in local placenames. At the time of Domesday, the western part of modern Harringay was within the Manor of Harengheie and part of the Bishop of London's principal Manor of Stepney. The eastern part was within the Manor of Tottenham held by Waltheof II, Earl of Northumbria, the last of the great Anglo-Saxon Earls.

From Domesday to the middle of the eighteenth century, Harringay was transformed from a mainly forested area to a pastoral one. It remained sparsely inhabited. Beyond the clearance of the forests, few incursions were made into Harringay lands save for the New River, the building of which presaged the more drastic developments to come.

== 1750 to 1880 ==
In 1750 the area that was to become Harringay was almost all agricultural land with only a few buildings. Over the 130 years to 1880, significant parts were brought into a more modern use, either as comfortable houses or as parkland. Most notably, Harringay House was built at the top of the hill between the present-day Hewitt and Allison Roads. At the southern end of Green Lanes, a large tile kiln and pottery was developed. But by 1880, fewer than two dozen buildings existed. Finsbury Park and nearby Alexandra Park were laid out during this period. And, perhaps most significantly, two railways were built, which, more than anything, presaged the next chapter in Harringay's history.

== 1880 – present day ==
The last 20 years of the nineteenth century saw the disappearance of Harringay House with the surrounding parkland and farmland under the advance of late Victorian urbanisation.

From 1900, Harringay was spread across the borders of the urban districts, later municipal boroughs, of Hornsey and Tottenham in Middlesex.

Following the Second World War, Harringay began to change as immigration altered the character of the district.

In 1965 it was unified under one local authority with the creation of the London Borough of Haringey.

== Harringay and entertainment ==
From 1750 until the second half of the twentieth century Harringay gained fame as an entertainment centre. In the second half of the eighteenth century Hornsey Wood House was developed as a private leisure park and became one of the most popular places for Londoners to escape from the city at the weekends. Finsbury Park, the development of which swept the old tavern away, was the first major metropolitan park in England and was hugely popular in its heyday. In the early twentieth century Harringay Stadium and Harringay Arena drew crowds to the area.

== Economic history ==
Relying on agriculture for most of its recorded history, Harringay had a busy tile kiln, pottery and brickfields from the late eighteenth to the early twentieth century.

== Transport & communications history ==
The history of transport and communications through Harringay had a significant effect on shaping it today.

=== Early roadways ===
In Roman times, a great road to the north was established. This endured as a great line of communication and brought much activity through the heart of the area. It also acted as the rough dividing line for land ownership, identifying Harringay's position on the edge of manorial and subsequently borough boundaries.

=== Rail ===
In the mid-nineteenth century, the arrival of the Great Northern Railway (GNR) cleaved Harringay from the rest of its ancient borough. The subsequent arrival of the Tottenham and Hampstead Junction Railway (THJR) almost defined its present-day southern boundary. Harringay's development in the late nineteenth century was of a markedly different nature from what occurred to the west of the GNR and to the south of the THJR.

=== The Tube ===
On two occasions in the early twentieth century, a Tube station was almost built in Harringay.
