= Newsam =

Newsam is a surname. Notable people with the surname include:

- Albert Newsam (1809–1864), American artist
- Bartholomew Newsam (died 1593), clockmaker to Queen Elizabeth I, probably born in York
- Frank Newsam, GCB, KBE, CVO, MC (1893–1964), British civil servant, Permanent Under-Secretary of State at the Home Office from 1948 to 1957
- John M. Newsam, British materials scientist, business innovator and entrepreneur, adjunct professor at UC San Diego
- Peter Newsam (born 1928), English educationist and a member of the Oxford Education Society

== See also ==
- Fowler Newsam Hall, Grade II listed group of Victorian school buildings
- Temple Newsam, Tudor-Jacobean house in Leeds, West Yorkshire, England, with grounds landscaped by Capability Brown
- Temple Newsam (ward), electoral ward of Leeds City Council, West Yorkshire
- Temple Newsam Preceptory, Templar farmstead, just east of Leeds, in West Yorkshire, England
