= St Ann's Church, Tottenham =

Coordinates: 51°34′52.5″N 0°5′4″W

St Ann's Church, South Tottenham
- Parish Church of St Ann
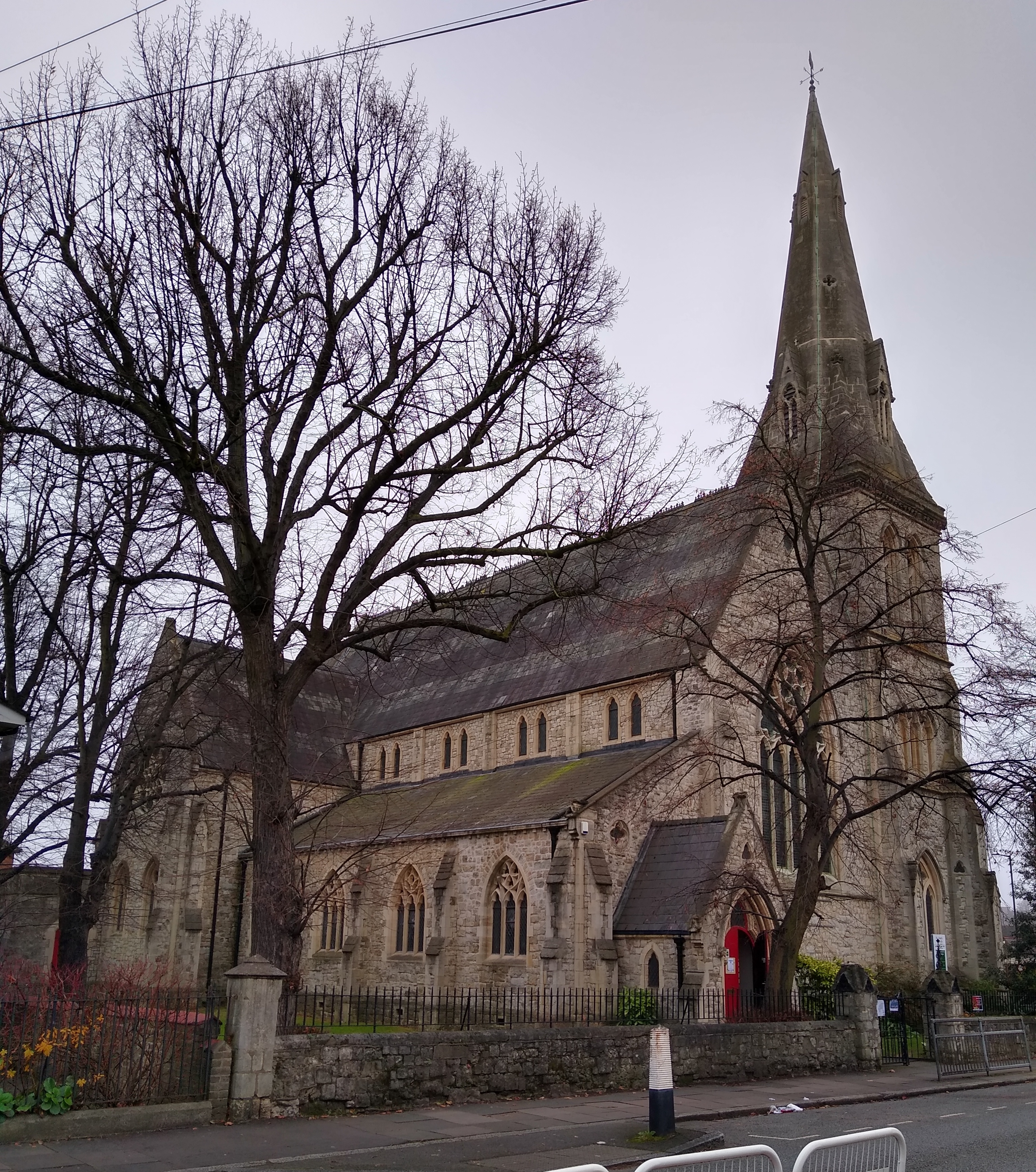
- St Ann's Church, South Tottenham
- Location: Avenue Road, Harringay, London, N15
- Country: England
- Denomination: Church of England
- Tradition: Evangelical

History
- Founded: 1860

Architecture
- Architect: Fowler Newsam
- Years built: 1861

Administration
- Province: Canterbury
- Diocese: London
- Archdeaconry: Hampstead
- Parish: St. Ann, Hanger Lane (South Tottenham)

Clergy
- Bishop: Robert Wickham
- Vicar: The Revd. Jessica Swift

St Ann's Church, South Tottenham, is an Evangelical Anglican church in the St Ann's neighbourhood in South Tottenham, London, UK, a part of the Church of England. The church currently holds one Sunday service at 10.30 am.

== History ==
The church was founded in 1860 and dedicated in 1861. The architect of the building was Thomas Talbot Bury. Its construction was funded by Fowler Newsam, a businessman who lived nearby. Fowler Newsam Hall, opposite the church on Avenue Road, is named after him.

=== The organ ===
The organ of 1842 was bought from Crosby Hall, London and installed here in 1862.
