= Birchmeadow Playing Fields =

Recreational area in Broseley, Shropshire, England

Coordinates: 52.6156°N 2.4816°W

Birchmeadow Playing Field Site is a 5.3-hectare (13-acre) recreational area in Broseley, England, consisting of a mixture of woodland, play area, and a football pitch. It was also one of the first places where a wooden railway was built. The site is protected by Fields in Trust through a legal "Deed of Dedication" safeguarding the future of the space as public recreation land for future generations to enjoy.

== History ==
An ironworks was located on the site which is now called Birchmeadow playing fields. It was served by one of the first railways in England, built in Broseley in 1605 by Richard Wilcox and William Wells. After several weeks, employees of the nearby coalmaster, lord of the manor James Clifford, vandalised and damaged the railway, possibly due to a rival rift between two coalmasters.

== Community spaces project ==
In November 2009 the Birchmeadow Park Management Committee was awarded £115,000 from various grant bodies to improve the park. The grant was spent on a new woodland path, an archway, the resurfacing of the car park, and a new play facility on the site. The park is continuing to be developed and future projects include increasing woodland management, improving the football pitches, improving the changing rooms, and enhancing the landscaping of the park.
