= Chestnuts Park =

Park in London, England

Coordinates: 51°34′57″N 0°05′24″W

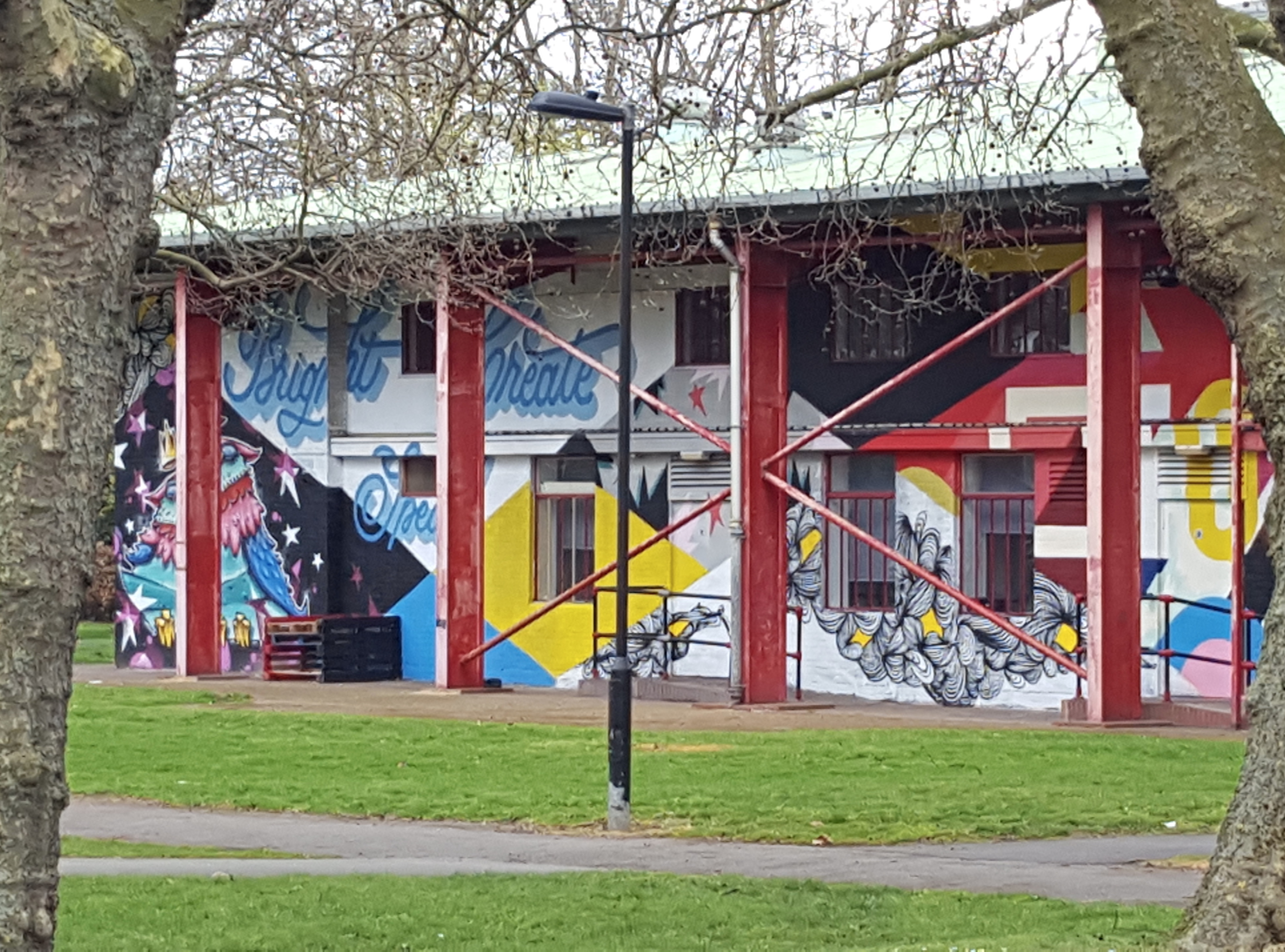
Exterior of community centre located in the park

Chestnuts Park is a park between the West Green, St. Ann's and Harringay neighbourhoods in the London Borough of Haringey.

It is 5 hectares (12 acres) in size and is located on St. Ann's Road and Black Boy Lane (now La Rose Lane), close to St. Ann's Hospital. It contains a café, community centre and tennis courts.

The park is protected in perpetuity as a site for public recreation with Fields in Trust, as part of the Queen Elizabeth II Fields Challenge scheme, and it received the Green Flag Award in May 2008.
