= Duckett's Green =

Coordinates: 51.589084°N 0.097842°W

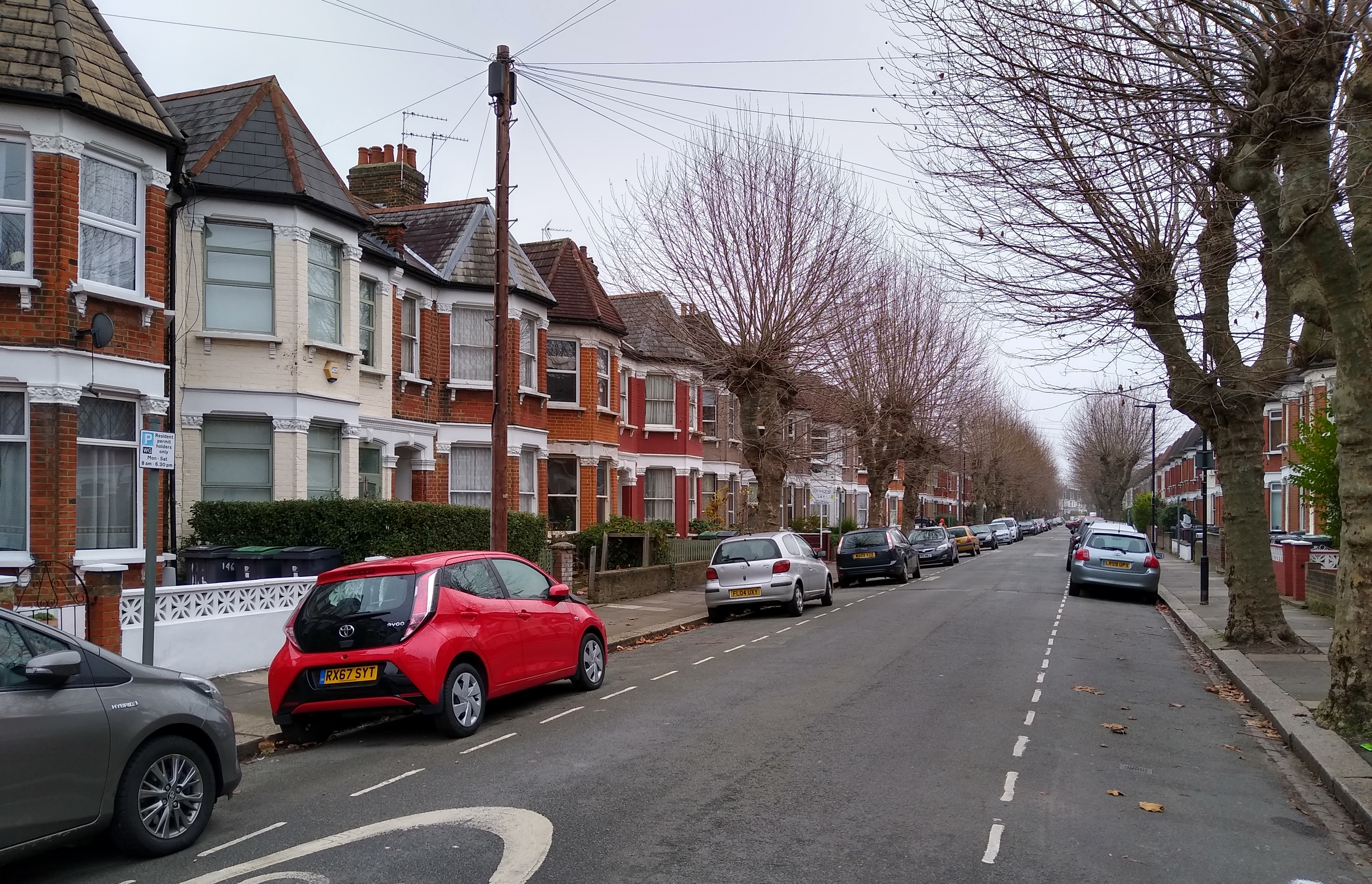

- Location within Greater London
- OS grid reference: TQ319895
- London borough: Haringey
- Ceremonial county: Greater London
- Region: London
- Country: England
- Sovereign state: United Kingdom
- Post town: LONDON
- Postcode district: N15
- Dialling code: 020
- Police: Metropolitan
- Fire: London
- Ambulance: London
- UK Parliament: Tottenham
- London Assembly: Enfield and Haringey

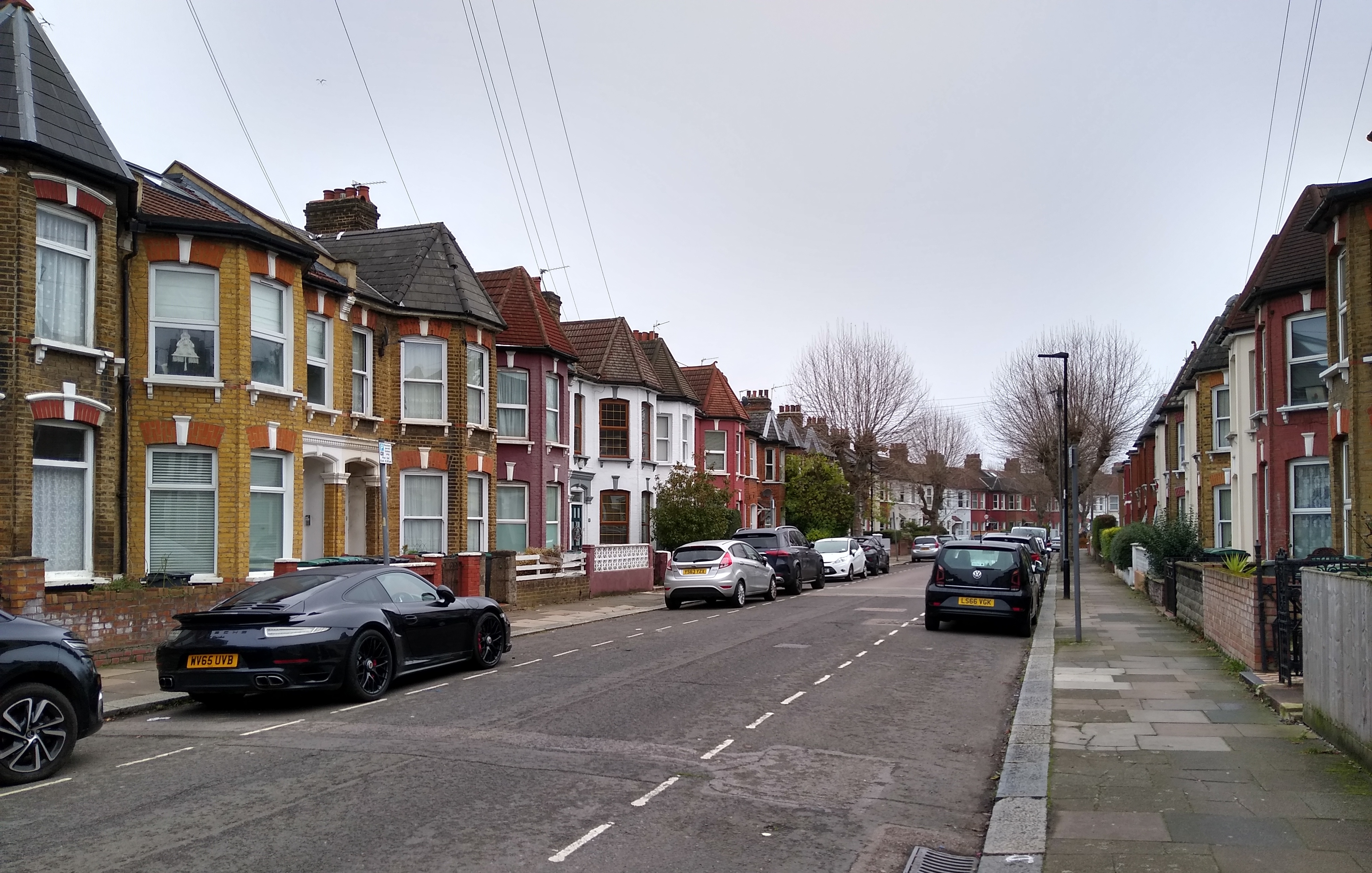
Duckett's Green

Duckett's Green is an area of north London, England in the United Kingdom and part of the London Borough of Haringey. It is an inner-suburban area located 5.8 miles (9.4 km) north of Charing Cross.

The area is mainly residential and borders Duckett's Common. Its area is roughly defined by West Green Road to the south-west, Belmont Road to the south-east, Ivatt Way and Langham Road to the north-east, Westbury Avenue to the north and Turnpike Lane Bus Station to the north-west.

== History ==
The area takes its name from one of the manors of Tottenham, Dovecotes, or Duckett's. The manor house itself was situated further north in the centre of what is today Wood Green. Settlement is first recorded at Duckett's Green in 1293. With agriculture being the main activity in this small area, population remained sparse until the middle of the nineteenth century. By 1860 a few houses had been built along West Green Road just to the east of the junction with Green Lanes and stretching northward, facing Duckett's Common, as far as Duckett's farm-house, then called Dovecote House. Development had also begun along Milton Road.

== Transport and locale ==
=== Nearest places ===
- Harringay
- West Green
- Wood Green

=== Nearest tube station ===
- Turnpike Lane tube station

=== Nearest railway stations ===
- Hornsey railway station

=== Bus routes ===
Routes 41, 29 serve the area.

== Links ==
- Duckett's Green shown on 'A New Topographical Map of the Country in the Vicinity of London, Describing all the New Improvements, Metropolitan Boroughs and Parish Boundaries c 1872' on the Mapco website
- Photo of the mid-nineteenth Century house in Duckett's Green along Green Lanes
- Duckett's Green on Google Maps
