= Park View School, West Green =

Park View School
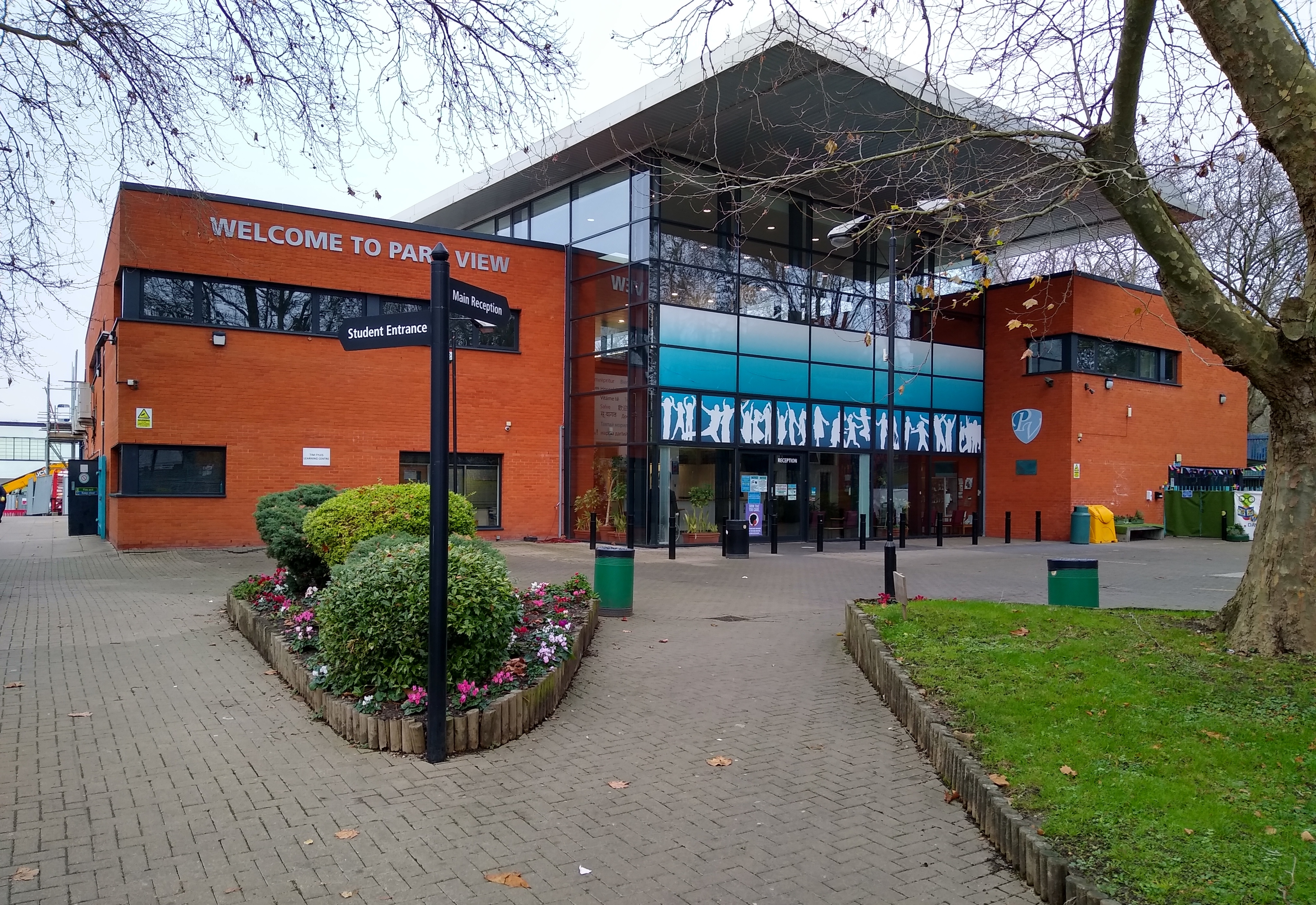

Location
- West Green Road; West Green, London, N15 3QR; England
- Coordinates: 51.58729°N 0.09032°W

Information
- Type: Community school
- Motto: Aspire, Achieve, Succeed,
- Local authority: Haringey
- Department for Education URN: 131757 Tables
- Ofsted: Reports
- Headteacher: Andrew Webster
- Gender: Mixed
- Age: 11 to 16
- Enrolment: 1,126
- Houses: Maple, Cedar, Elm and Oak
- Website: www.parkview.haringey.sch.uk

Park View School is a mixed secondary school located in the West Green area in the London Borough of Haringey, England.

It is a community school administered by Haringey London Borough Council. The catchment area of Park View encompasses one of the most ethnically, culturally and socially diverse areas in the UK and over 74% of pupils at the school speak English as an additional language. Park View emphasises its "broad and balanced" curriculum, placing equal importance on the arts and sport alongside academic rigour, to support pupils' success.

Andrew Webster has led Park View as headteacher since 2014, and Park View has been consistently rated as good by Ofsted since 2013. This was reaffirmed by a full Section 5 inspection in 2023. Park View is a national leader in supporting child mental health and well-being. It has operated as a 'trauma-informed' school since 2017 and prides itself on actively fostering positive relationships across the community. In 2015, Park View was awarded a prestigious HSJ award for its work in this area. Park View believes that all children must experience enriching educational opportunities to allow children to thrive.
