= Seven Sisters, London =

District of north London, England

Coordinates: 51.582214°N 0.073708°W

Seven Sisters
- Location within Greater London
- Population: 15,968 (2011 Census Ward)
- OS grid reference: TQ334888
- London borough: Haringey
- Ceremonial county: Greater London
- Region: London
- Country: England
- Sovereign state: United Kingdom
- Post town: LONDON
- Postcode district: N15
- Dialling code: 020
- Police: Metropolitan
- Fire: London
- Ambulance: London
- UK Parliament: Tottenham
- London Assembly: Enfield and Haringey

Seven Sisters is a district of Tottenham, north London, England, at the eastern end of Seven Sisters Road, which runs from Tottenham High Road to join the A1 in Holloway.

== Etymology ==
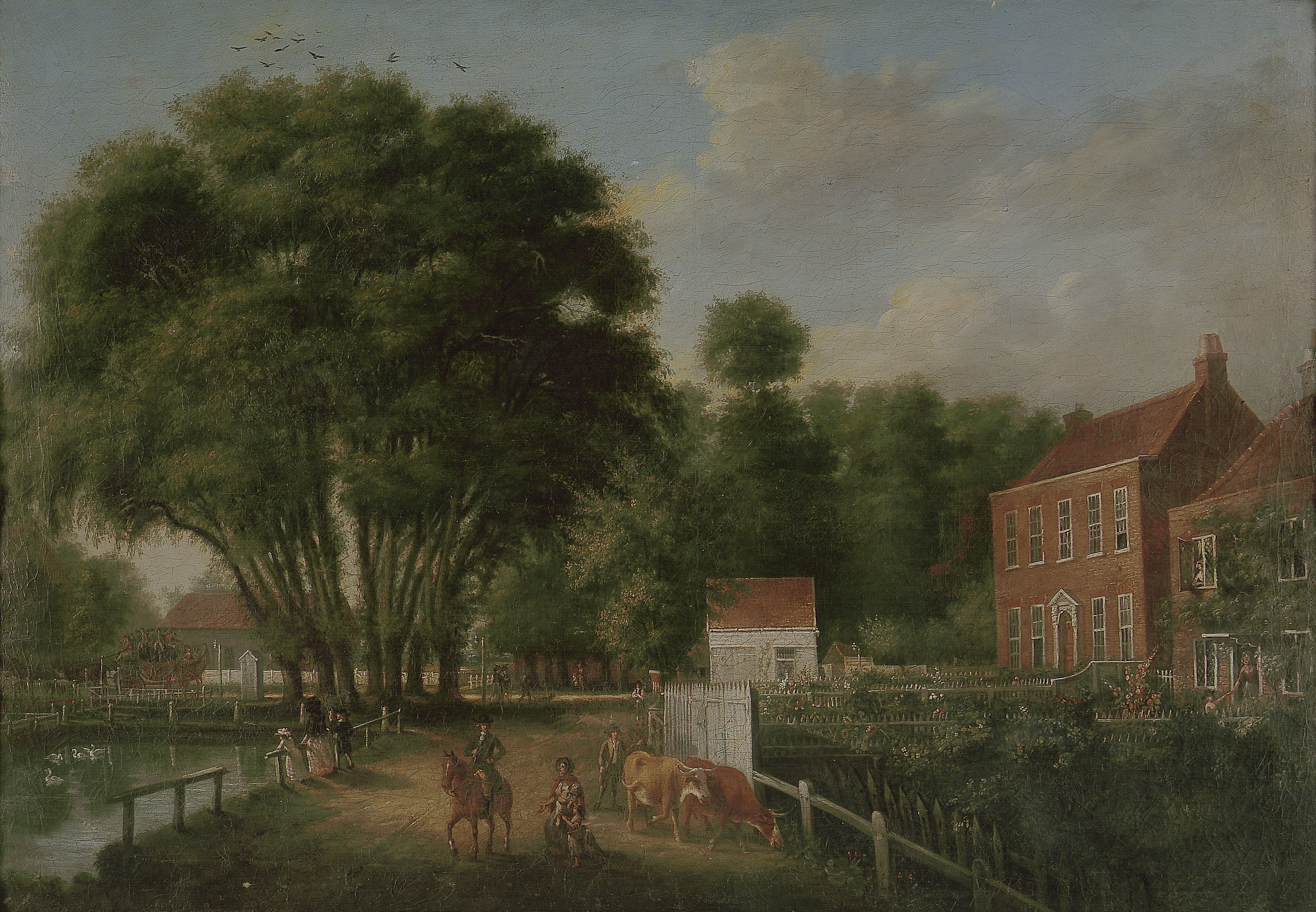
1790 painting of the Seven Sisters by John Greenwood

The Dorset map of 1619 shows the area known today as Seven Sisters named as Page Greene. However, by 1805 the first series Ordnance Survey map was showing the area as Seven Sisters.

The name is derived from seven elms which were planted in a circle with a walnut tree at their centre on an area of common land known as Page Green. The clump was known as the Seven Sisters by 1732.

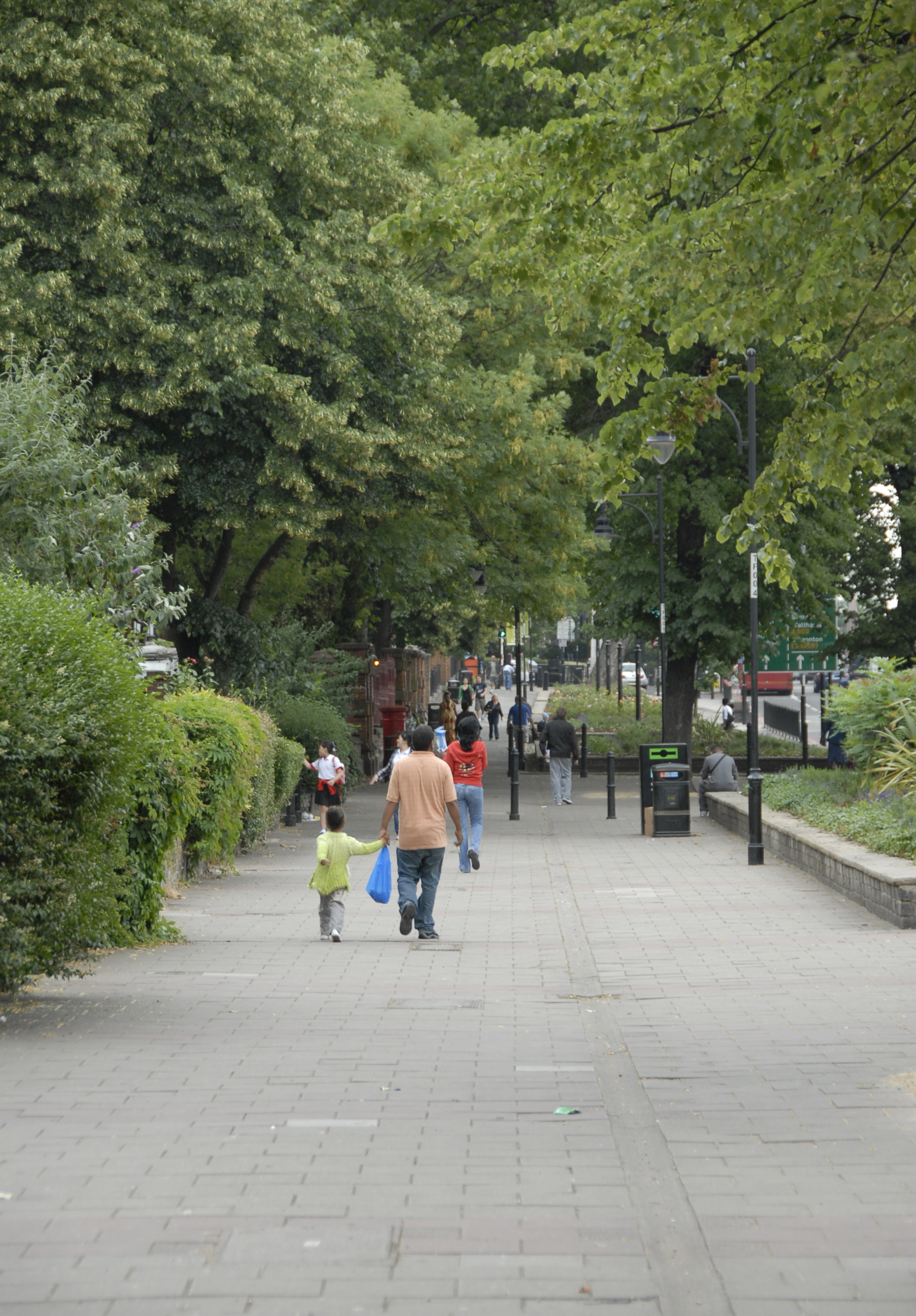
High Road, Seven Sisters

In his early-seventeenth-century work, The Briefe Description of the Towne of Tottenham Highcrosse, local vicar and historian William Bedwell singled out the walnut tree for particular mention. He wrote of it as a local 'arboreal wonder' which 'flourished without growing bigger'. He described it as popularly associated with the burning of an unknown Protestant. There is also speculation that the tree was ancient, possibly going back as far as Roman times, perhaps standing in a sacred grove or pagan place of worship.

The location of the seven trees can be tracked through a series of maps from 1619 on. From 1619 they are shown in a position which today corresponds with the western tip of Page Green at the junction of Broad Lane and the High Road. With urbanisation radically changing the area, the 'Seven Sisters' had been replanted by 1876, still on Page Green, but further to the east. Contemporary maps show them remaining in this new location until 1955.

The current ring of hornbeam trees on Page Green Common was planted in 1997 in a ceremony led by five families of seven sisters.

== History ==
Seven Sisters is on the route of Ermine Street, the Roman road connecting London to York. At the time of Domesday, the area was within the Manor of Tottenham held by Waltheof II, Earl of Northumbria, the last of the great Anglo-Saxon Earls.

In the medieval period a settlement grew up at Page Green and the woodland was increasingly cleared for agriculture. In the early decades of the nineteenth century, the Seven Sisters Road was constructed and the area saw the construction of a number of large houses, including Suffield Lodge, Seven Sisters House and Grove Place. These fine buildings soon fell victim to the spread of Victorian London and by the third quarter of the century the area had been almost completely built over.

== Seven Sisters today ==
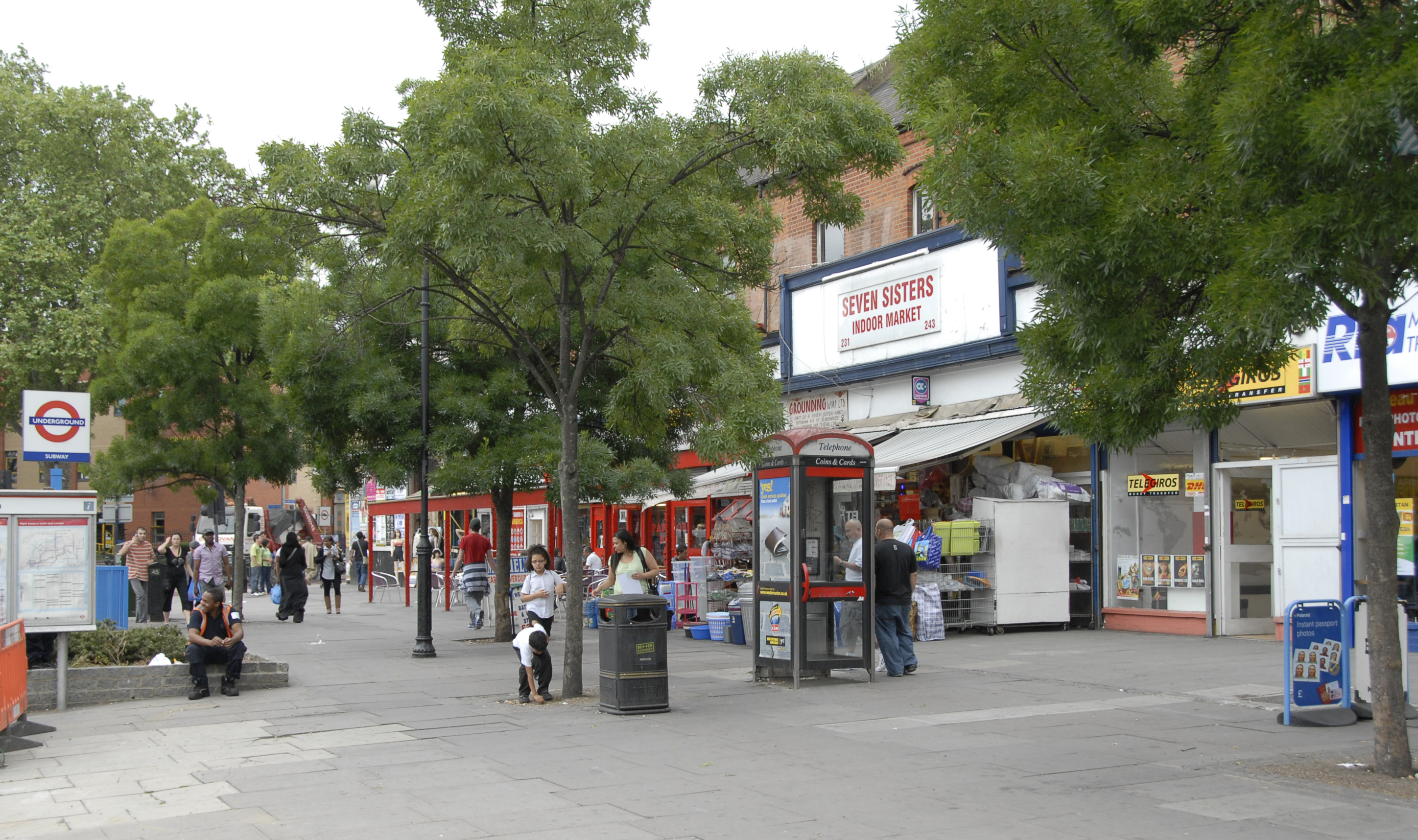
Seven Sisters Market

Today Seven Sisters is a multi-cultural area strongly influenced by its location on key road and underground rail routes. Immediately above the tube station is an early-Edwardian department store building, formerly occupied by Wards Furnishing Stores, which traded until 1972. Part of the building, known locally as Wards Corner became an indoor market with a strong Latin American flavour, known as "Latin Village" or "Pueblito Paisa". The site had been under threat of demolition since 2004 (see section Plans for development below); there were plans to redevelop it in 2018, but this action was resisted, and cancelled in August 2021.

The Clyde Circus Conservation Area stretches between the busy local shops of West Green Road and Philip Lane. Most of the residential streets between are in the Conservation Area, but not the more modern Lawrence Road and Elizabeth Place.

Residents of the Clyde Circus Conservation Area are brought together by the Clyde Area Residents Association (CARA), which holds an annual street party. Its sister group, the Fountain Area Residents Association (FARA), covers residents to the south of West Green Road, namely those in Kirkton Road, Roslyn Road, Seaford Road, Elmar Road, Turner Avenue, Brunel Walk, Avenue Road and Braemar Road. Recent successful projects organised by FARA members include the creation of a community garden at the site of a dated pedestrian ramp.

Another community project is the Avenue Orchard. The local community utilised wasteland behind a concrete wall on Avenue Road for planting apple trees, and held a workshop with local artists to source ideas for how to improve the look and feel of the wall and area around the Avenue Orchard.

== Plans for development ==
The old Wards Corner building above the tube station was earmarked for development in 2004, when Haringey Council published a development brief. In August 2007 Haringey Council entered into a Development Agreement with developer Grainger plc. Grainger's plan to demolish the existing buildings on the site and replace them with a new mixed-use development of retail and residential units was met with local opposition. The Wards Corner Coalition (WCC) campaigned for the existing buildings and Latin American market to be retained and improved. The WCC mounted a legal challenge against the plans and, in June 2010, the Court of Appeal quashed the planning permission.

In 2012, Grainger submitted revised plans for the site. Haringey Council granted planning permission for the revised plans on 12 July 2012. After protests, the plan was definitively cancelled in August 2021.

In addition to the Wards Corner plans, further projects for regeneration in Seven Sisters are planned. Haringey Council's 'Plan for Tottenham' sets out the council's long-term vision for the area. Plans to regenerate Lawrence Road were put out for consultation and are now partly implemented. Transport for London has completed a major project to improve the Tottenham Hale Gyratory – a busy one-way system that used to pass Seven Sisters station – converting it to a slower, pedestrian-friendly, two-way road.

== Politics ==
Seven Sisters is part of the Tottenham constituency for elections to the House of Commons of the United Kingdom.

Seven Sisters is part of the Seven Sisters ward for elections to Haringey London Borough Council.

== Nearest places ==
- Alexandra Park
- Bruce Grove
- Harringay
- Hornsey
- Manor House
- St Ann's
- Stamford Hill
- Stoke Newington
- Tottenham Hale
- Turnpike Lane
- West Green
- Wood Green

== Nearest railway stations ==
- Seven Sisters station
- South Tottenham railway station
- Tottenham Hale railway station
- Stamford Hill railway station
- Harringay Green Lanes railway station
