= South Tottenham =

Coordinates: 51.584°N 0.073°W

- Location within Greater London
- London borough: Haringey
- Ceremonial county: Greater London
- Region: London
- Country: England
- Sovereign state: United Kingdom
- Post town: LONDON
- Postcode district: N15
- Dialling code: 020
- Police: Metropolitan
- Fire: London
- Ambulance: London
- UK Parliament: Tottenham
- London Assembly: Enfield and Haringey

South Tottenham is an area of the London Borough of Haringey, north London.

== Location ==
South Tottenham occupies parts of the N15 and N17 postal districts. It is bordered in the south by Stamford Hill, the west by St Ann's and West Green, the north by Tottenham, and the east by the Lee Valley Reservoirs. The area has a diverse population. The Seven Sisters Ward has the largest proportion of Jewish residents among Haringey wards, at 18.1%.

== Transport ==
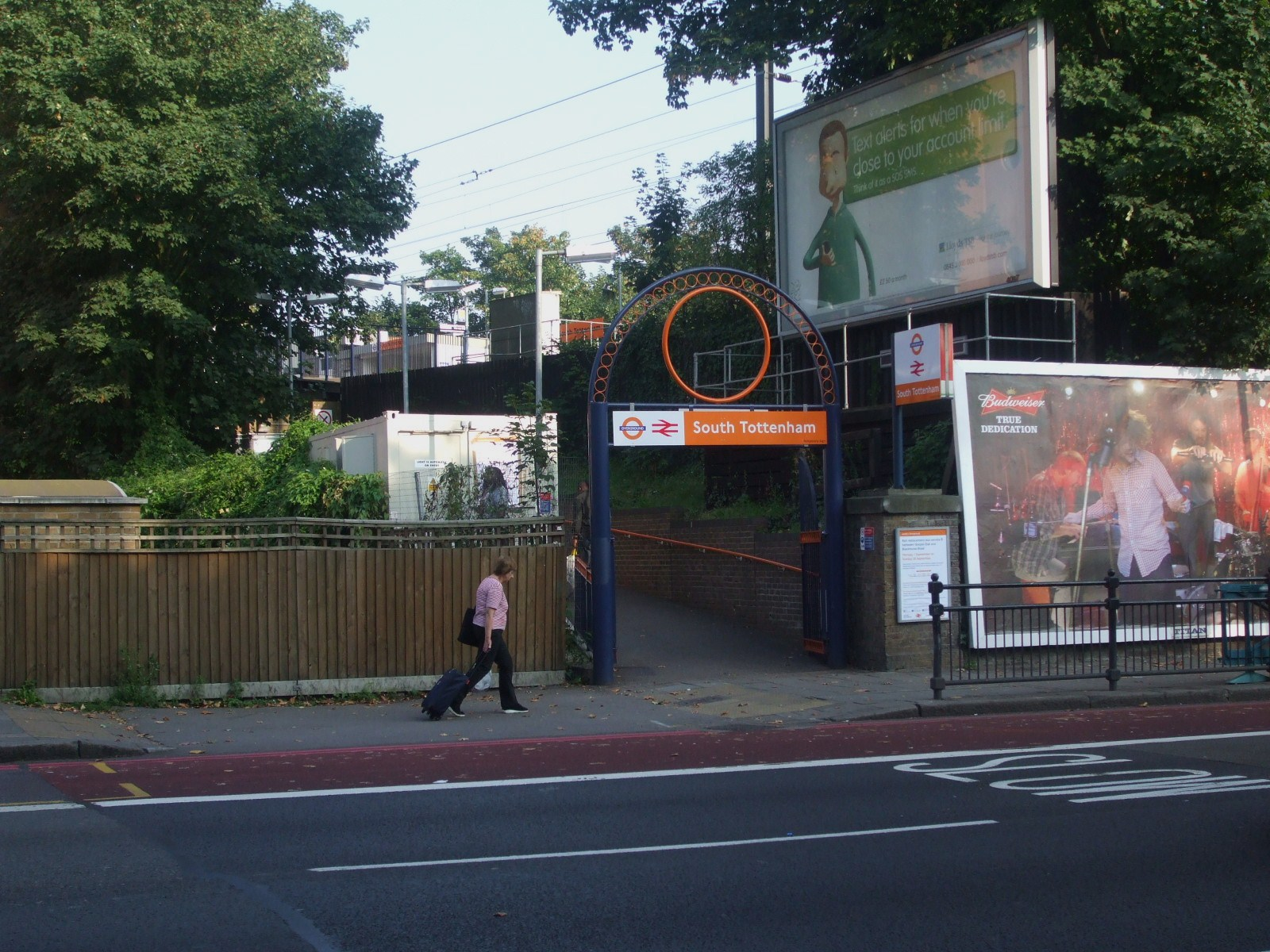
South Tottenham station entrance, in Overground colours.

It is served by South Tottenham railway station on the London Overground, and by Seven Sisters station, on the London Overground, London Underground (Victoria line) and National Rail.
