= West Green, London =

Sub-district of Tottenham, north London

Coordinates: 51.5864°N 0.0902°W

West Green
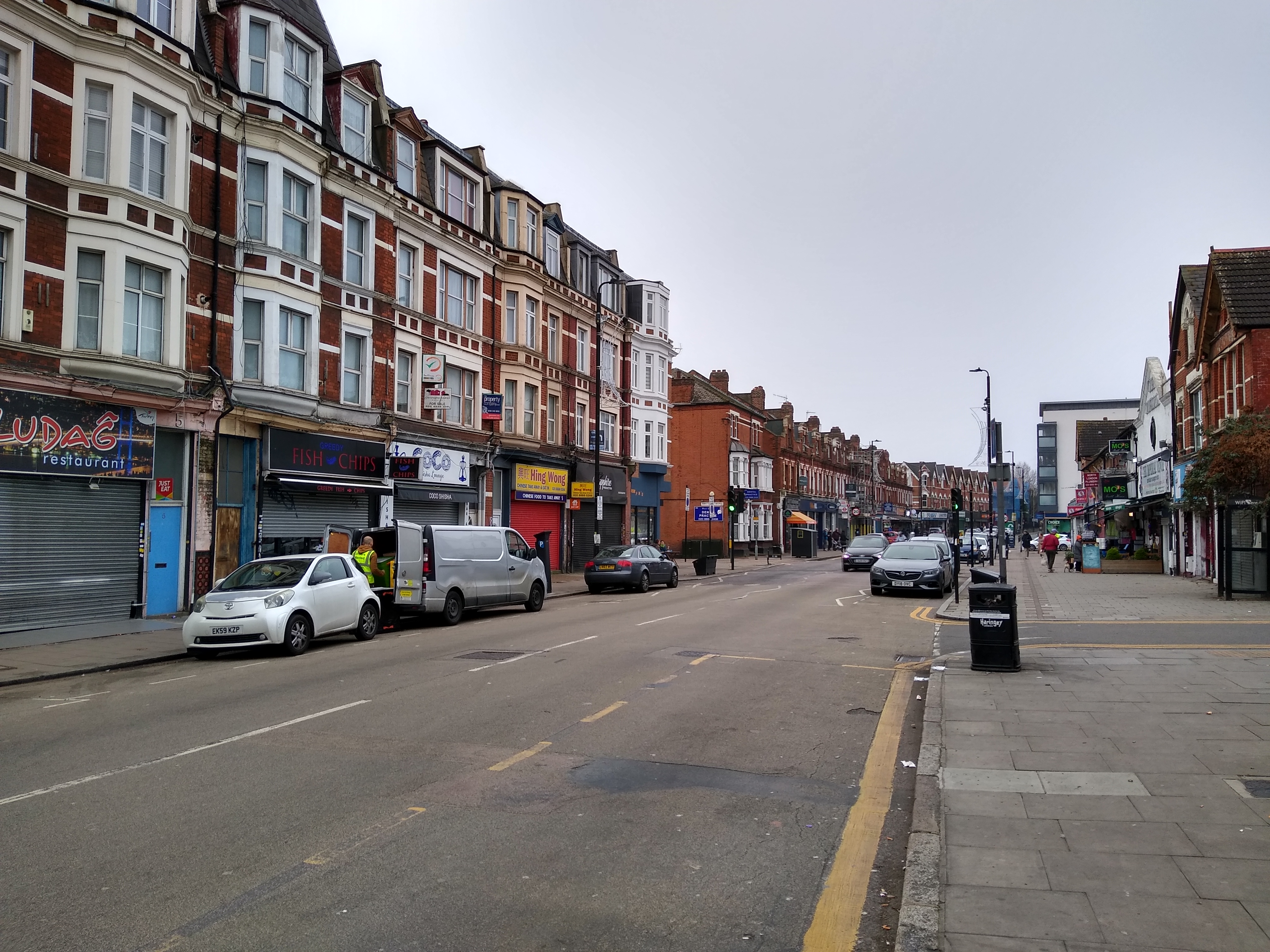

- Location within Greater London
- Population: 13,372 (2011 Census)
- OS grid reference: TQ324892
  - Charing Cross: 5.7 mi (9.2 km) S
- London borough: Haringey
- Ceremonial county: Greater London
- Region: London
- Country: England
- Sovereign state: United Kingdom
- Post town: LONDON
- Postcode district: N15, N17
- Dialling code: 020
- Police: Metropolitan
- Fire: London
- Ambulance: London
- UK Parliament: Tottenham
- London Assembly: Enfield and Haringey

West Green is a district in north London, England, in the United Kingdom, within the London Borough of Haringey. It is located 5.7 miles (9.22 km) north of Charing Cross.

The area is mainly residential and includes both Chestnuts and Downhills parks. Its boundaries are roughly marked by Downhills Park to the north and north-west, Higham Road and Clonmell Road to the north-east, Avenue Road to the south-east, St Ann's Road to the south, Belmont Road to the west, and a line stretching from Stanley Road to La Rose Lane on the south-west.

== History ==
West Green developed as a small village in the Middle Ages, with settlement first recorded in 1393. By the start of the seventeenth century, the eight buildings that then stood in West Green formed the only hamlet in the central area of the manor of Tottenham. Although it had not grown by 1800, by 1840 it contained 18 houses. This made it bigger than Wood Green at that time. Development took off during the period after the 1860s, particularly after the arrival of the Tottenham & Hampstead Junction Railway in 1878. Nineteenth-century local author Charlotte Riddell described the changes vividly in her 1874 book, Above Suspicion:

Sixteen years ago no more rural village could have been found within five miles of the General Post Office than West Green. It was as utterly in the country as though situated a hundred miles from London, and by a natural consequence it was country in its ways, habits, and manners. The various lanes leading to it from Stamford Hill, Tottenham, Hornsey, and Southgate were rural, which they certainly are not now…As for Hanger Lane, no one had yet dreamed of the evil days to come, when mushroom villas should be built upon the ground that not long before was regarded as an irreclaimable morass—when at first a tavern and then a church (the two invariable pioneers of that which, for some unknown reason, we call civilisation) appeared on the scene, and brought London following at their heels . . . when, in a word, Hanger Lane should be improved off the face of the earth and in the interest of speculative builders... called, as it is at present, St. Ann’s Road, it has only taken sixteen years to change West Green from an extremely pretty village to an eminently undesirable suburb.

By 1890, the urbanisation of the area was complete.

== Ward ==
As of May 2022, the electoral ward of West Green encompasses a significantly larger area than the district described here. The ward includes several neighbours such as Duckett's Green and extends north to Lordship Lane. The neighbouring wards are Noel Park, White Hart Lane, Bruce Castle, Tottenham Central, St Ann's, and Harringay.

== Education ==
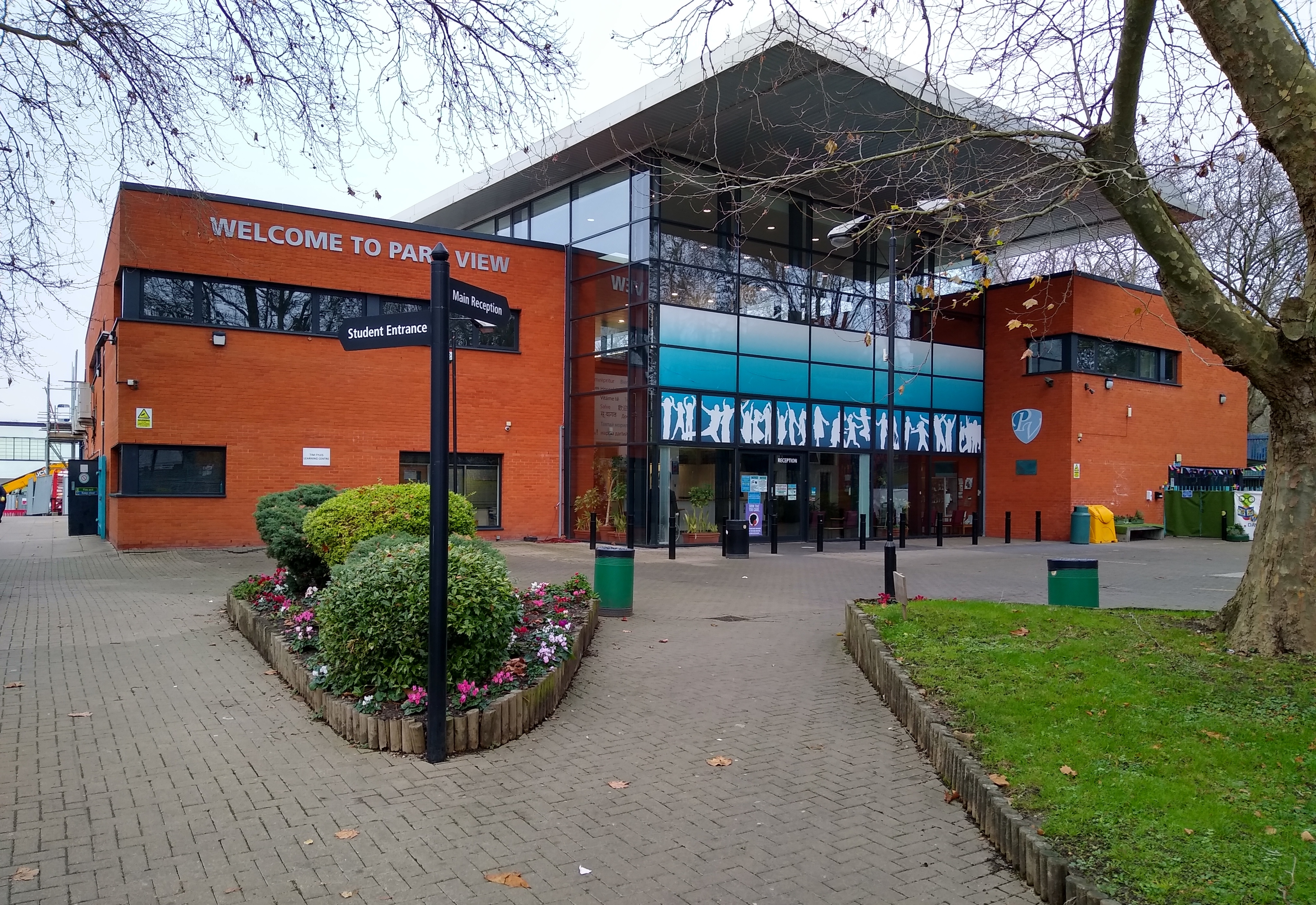
Park View School

Park View is a secondary school located in the area. The school is situated next to Downhills Park.

== Transport and locale ==
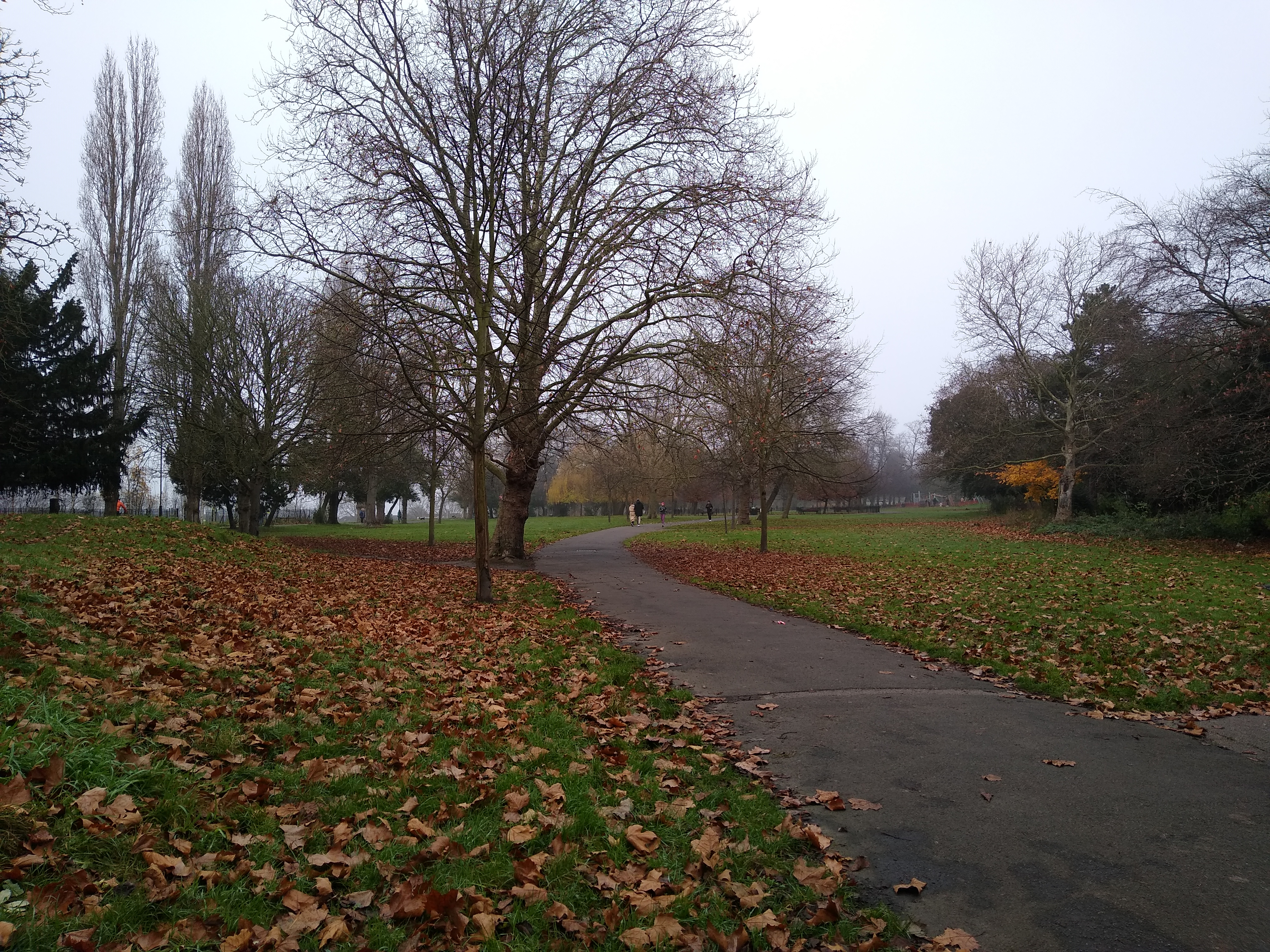
Downhills Park

=== Nearest places ===
- Duckett's Green (West)
- Harringay (SouthWest)
- St Ann's (SouthEast)
- Seven Sisters
- Tottenham
- Turnpike Lane
- Wood Green

=== Nearest tube station ===
- Turnpike Lane tube station
- Seven Sisters tube station

=== Nearest railway stations ===
- South Tottenham railway station
- Seven Sisters station
- Harringay Green Lanes station

=== Buses ===
London bus routes 41, 67, 230, 341, N41 and W4 serve West Green.

== Politics ==
West Green is part of the Tottenham constituency for elections to the House of Commons of the United Kingdom.

West Green is part of the West Green ward for elections to Haringey London Borough Council.

== See also ==
- West Green railway station
- Palace Gates Line
