= St Ann's, London =

Coordinates: 51.5813°N 0.0852°W

St Ann's
- Location within Greater London
- Population: 14,638 (2011 Census. Ward)
- OS grid reference: TQ314872
- London borough: Haringey
- Ceremonial county: Greater London
- Region: London
- Country: England
- Sovereign state: United Kingdom
- Post town: LONDON
- Postcode district: N15
- Dialling code: 020
- Police: Metropolitan
- Fire: London
- Ambulance: London
- UK Parliament: Tottenham
- London Assembly: Enfield and Haringey

St Ann's is a neighbourhood in Tottenham, north London, England, in the London Borough of Haringey. It is located to the east of Harringay and West Green and is split between the St Ann's ward and the Hermitage and Gardens ward.

== Location ==
St Ann's extends from Chestnuts Park in the west to Seven Sisters Road in the east. To the south, its boundary is defined by the London Overground railway line.

== History ==
St. Ann's Church was built in a rural setting in the middle of the nineteenth century and consecrated in 1861. A hamlet soon began to grow up around the church. However, it was quickly swallowed up by the northward march of London. By the mid-1890s, it could no longer be distinguished as a separate hamlet.

== Nearest places ==
- South Tottenham
- West Green
- Seven Sisters
- Stamford Hill
- Harringay

== Transport ==
=== Nearest tube and rail stations ===
- Seven Sisters tube and railway station
- South Tottenham railway station
- Stamford Hill railway station
- Harringay Green Lanes railway station
