= Fields in Trust =

British open space charity

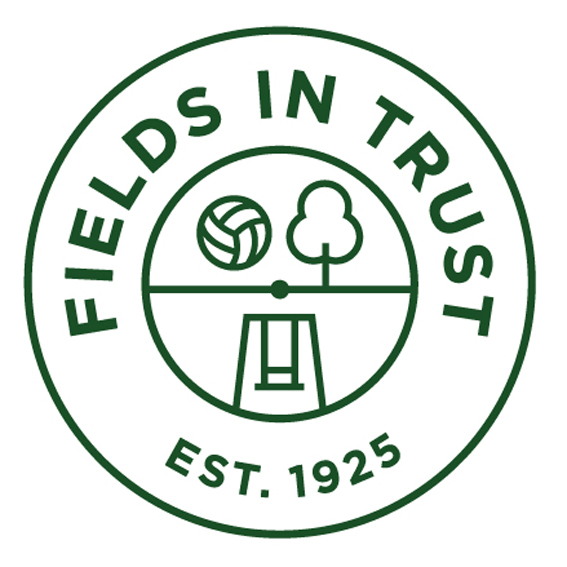
- Founded: 1925
- Founder: King George VI
- Type: Charity
- Registration no.: 306070 (England and Wales) SC040357 (Scotland)
- Purpose: protection of recreational green space
- Location: London
- Region served: UK
- Patron: The Prince of Wales
- Chair of Trustees: Jo Barnett
- Chief Executive: Helen Griffiths
- Employees: 15
- Website: www.fieldsintrust.org
- Formerly called: NPFA National Playing Fields Association

Fields in Trust is a British charity set up in 1925 as the National Playing Fields Association (NPFA), by Brigadier-General Reginald Kentish and the Duke of York, later King George VI, who was the first president, which protects parks and green spaces and promotes the cause of accessible spaces for play, sports and recreation in British cities and towns.

As well as campaigning to protect playing fields and open space, Fields in Trust legally protects the King George's Fields, 471 public recreation grounds set up as a memorial to King George V.

== History ==
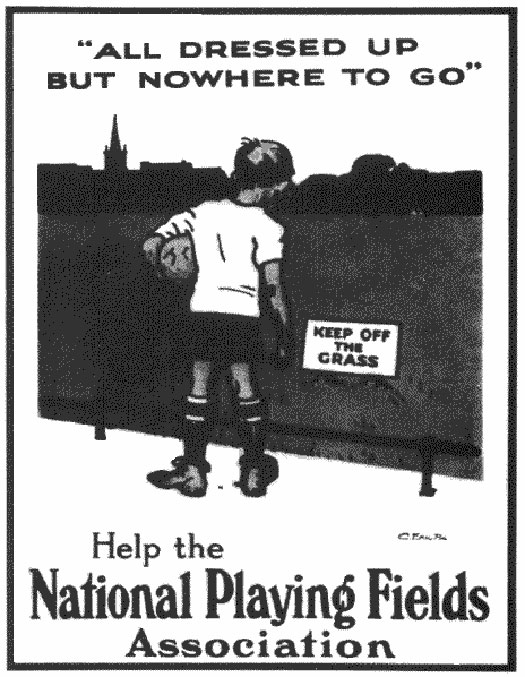
Marketing image created by the then National Playing Fields Association in the 1920s

The charity was set up in 1925 as the National Playing Fields Association (NPFA), by Brigadier-General Reginald Kentish and was founded by the Duke of York, later King George VI, who was the first president. This royal link continued with Queen Elizabeth II as Patron from 1952 until her death in 2022 and Prince Philip, Duke of Edinburgh, as President from 1947 until he stepped down in 2013 to be succeeded by his grandson William, Prince of Wales. Prince William became the charity's patron in 2024.

Fields in Trust is a charity incorporated by Royal charter in 1932. The organisation was awarded the Olympic Cup in 1931 by the International Olympic Committee in recognition of its work providing Playing Fields in Great Britain.

The Charity’s affairs are conducted through its Council, which meets quarterly to set the policy of the Association and to oversee its work. It is also linked to many other bodies, and the members of the organisation include local authorities, individuals, playing field associations, schools, and sports clubs. In 1972, Fields in Trust (then the NFPA) supported the Bishop of Stepney, Trevor Huddleston, in denouncing the lack of play provision which had led to the deaths by drowning of two boys who lived in his diocese. This gave the impetus to the Fair Play for Children campaign.

Fields in Trust set standards for playground provision in the UK through the Six Acre Standard, which is widely recognised as a planning tool for local authorities as a basis, when stipulating play area provision for new housing development, and in local play policies. Fields in Trust is one of the agencies represented on the UK Government School Playing Fields Advisory Panel convened by the Department for Education to scrutinise the disposal or change of use of playing fields and school land.

== Objectives ==
Recommendations on Outdoor Playing Space were first formulated in 1925, soon after the Association’s formation. This was with the intention of ensuring "every man, woman and child in Great Britain should have the opportunity of participating in outdoor recreational activity within a reasonable distance of home during leisure hours". The charity urged all local authorities to adopt a minimum standard of provision of 5 acres (2.0 ha) of public open space for every 1,000 people, of which at least 4 acres (1.6 ha) "should be set aside for team games, tennis, bowls and children’s playgrounds".

Since then, Fields in Trust have kept the recreational space standard under regular review. It now stands as the Six Acre Standard, recommending 6 acres (2.4 ha) per 1,000 head of population as a minimum necessity for space.

In 1992, the Association revised its recommendations on recreational space to include the Children’s Playing Space Standard aspect of the Six Acre Standard - part of the recommendation then was a general statement of the need for adequate children’s playing space.

== Protected Land ==
Fields in Trust supervises the property over which the Association acts as Guardian Trustee and ensures that it retains its charitable purpose. The Fields in Trust charity has a role in the protection of over 2,800 parks, playing fields and nature reserves across the United Kingdom. In total, the Fields in Trust's land portfolio represents an interest over 30,000 acres (12,000 ha). In the 1920s and 1930s many of the sites were funded by the Carnegie United Kingdom Trust on the basis that the land would be kept as public playing fields in perpetuity. In all of its work, Fields in Trust is assisted by affiliated national and county associations and other partners.

== King George's Field ==
Fields in Trust is the Trustee of the King George's Fields Foundation (KGFF). The Foundation was established as a Memorial to the Late King George V by Trust Deed on 3 November 1936. The objects of the Trust were "to promote and to assist in the establishment throughout the United Kingdom of Great Britain and Northern Ireland of Playing Fields for the use and enjoyment of the people every such Playing Field to be styled ‘King George’s Field’ and to be distinguished by heraldic panels or other appropriate tablet medallion or inscription commemorative of the King".

The Trust defined a playing field as "any open space used for the purpose of outdoor games, sports and pastimes".

These playing fields have their origins in an appeal launched shortly after the death of George V in March 1936. Rather than finance the entire cost of a few schemes, grants were given towards the cost of as many fields as possible, the balance being raised by the local authority or other organisation providing the field and accepting responsibility for its maintenance. In most cases, the responsible body entered into a Deed of Dedication declaring that the recreation ground shall "be preserved in perpetuity as a Memorial to His Late Majesty under the provisions of the KGFF and shall henceforth be known as a 'King George’s Field'." The NPFA would act, as administrator, to look at and consider proposals in order to allocate grants.

A Charity Commission Scheme was made on 1 December 1965 passing the trusteeship of the Foundation to the NPFA and, among other things, widening the objects of the Foundation to include the "preservation" of the King George’s Fields.

== Six Acre Standard ==
The Six Acre Standard aims to help land use planners ensure a sufficient level of open space to enable residents of all ages to participate in sports and games with an emphasis on access for children to playgrounds and other play space. The standard suggests that for each 1000 residents there should be a total of 6 acres (2.4 ha) of recreational land, of which 4 acres (1.6 ha) should be for outdoor sport and recreation space (including parks) and 2 acres (0.81 ha) for children's play, with some of this being equipped playgrounds.

In its publication The Six Acre Standard, the FiT outlines a more detailed breakdown including a hierarchy of child play space.

=== The New Six Acre Standard ===
Fields in Trust reissued The Six Acre Standard under the new name Guidance for Outdoor Sport and Play in 2015 as an online reference work for planners in the UK. It has been updated to include the modern planning regime and new topics such as sustainability and the local environment. These areas come under the heading "Open Space" which refers to all open space, and is deemed as a community asset, and value, and is protected by legislation in the Core Strategy (2006–2026). Versions of the Guidance for the devolved administrations of Scotland and Wales were launched in January 2017 as well as a Welsh Language edition.

Children's sports fields on educational land are not recorded as Open Space and are not protected by Open Space legislation. However, any change of use of educational land requires local or national government approval. The government decisions can be contested by the local community.

== Queen Elizabeth II Fields Challenge ==
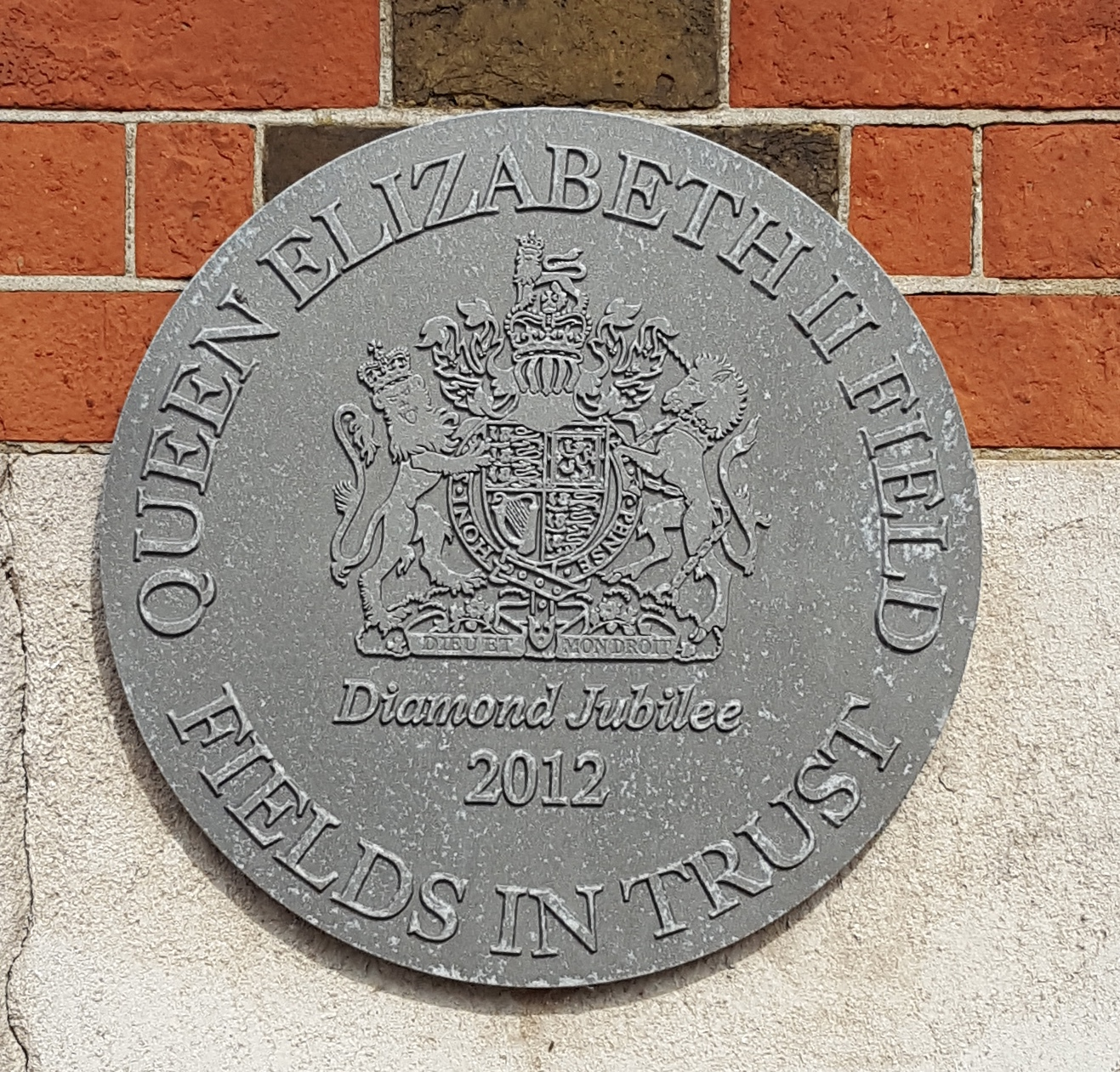
Plaque placed under the Fields Challenge scheme at the entrance to Chestnuts Park

Queen Elizabeth II Fields Challenge, (known as the "Queen Elizabeth Fields Challenge" in Scotland), was a programme run by Fields in Trust aiming to protect outdoor recreational spaces across the UK to create a "grassroots legacy" in celebration of the 2012 Diamond Jubilee.

== Presidents ==
The National Playing Fields Association has a close association with members of the Royal Family serving as patrons and president since their foundation in 1925.

Presidents:

- George VI 1925 – 1948
- Prince Philip, Duke of Edinburgh 1948 – 2013
- William, Prince of Wales 2013 – 2025
- Jill Scott 2025 – Present

== See also ==
- List of King George V Playing Fields
- Urban planning
- Gyro International, established 1912, sponsor of playgrounds in Canada and the United States
