= Fowler Newsam Hall =

Listed school building in London, England

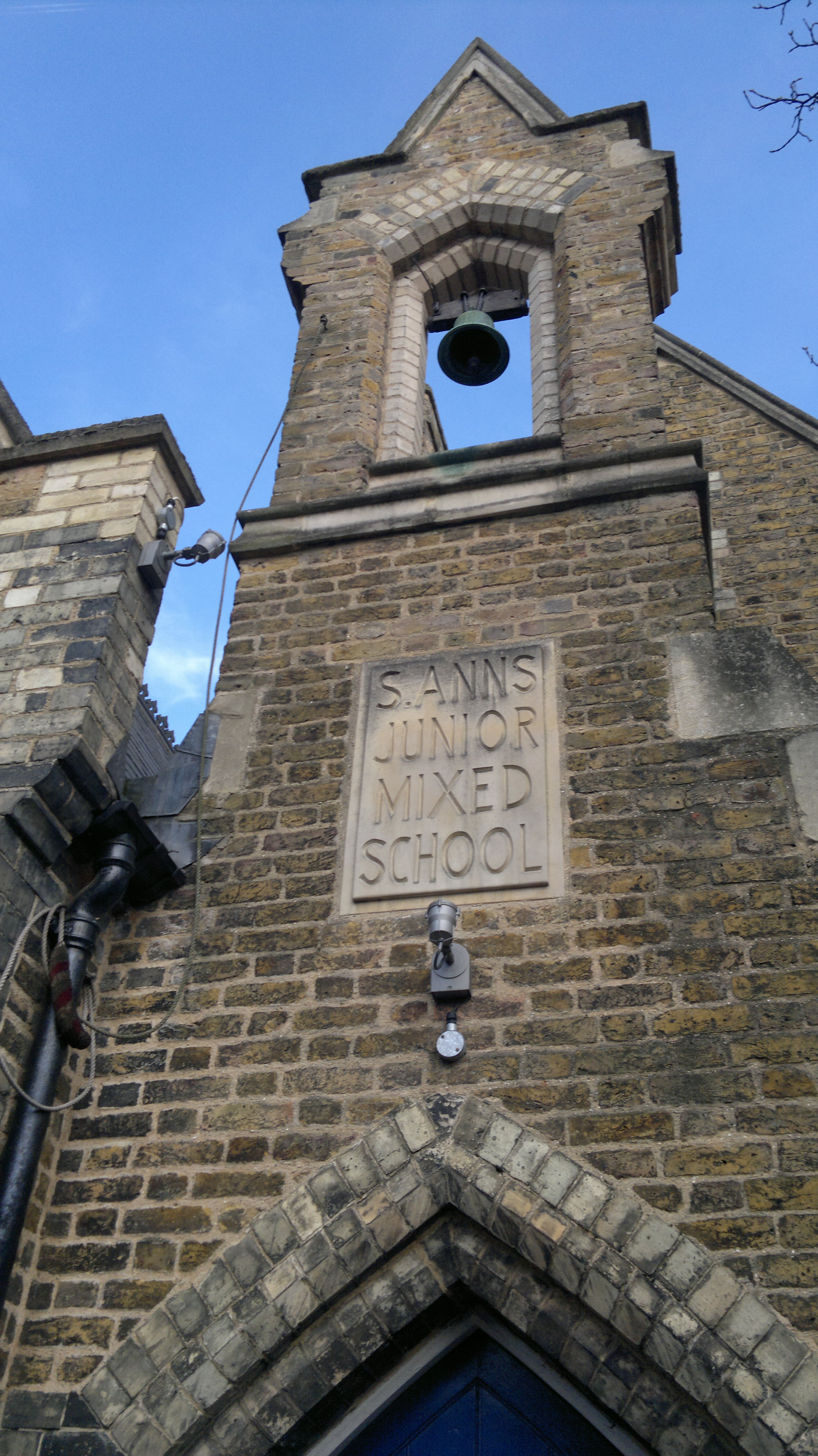
- The refurbished Bell Tower at Fowler Newsam Hall
- Former names: Hermitage school for boys, girls, and infants Hermitage school for boys, girls Saint Ann's Junior Mixed School

General information
- Status: Completed
- Type: Victorian School
- Architectural style: Victorian
- Location: 1a Avenue Road, London, N15
- Coordinates: 51.581327°N 0.085082°W
- Renovated: 1978/9
- Renovation cost: £528,000

Renovating team
- Renovating firm: Rackham Construction

Fowler Newsam Hall is a Grade II listed group of Victorian school buildings in London, England. Originally the Saint Ann's Junior Mixed School, they become dilapidated during the nineteen sixties. They were refurbished by Rackham Construction in 1978/9 and reopened on 1 July 1979. The charity set up in 1966 to raise funds for this purpose was closed in 2013.

Fowler Newsam, a wealthy business man who lived near the site, was the primary benefactor of both St Ann's Church opposite the hall on Avenue Road and the school itself.

== Architecture ==
"...a 19th brick building with three gables of varying width. A recessed entrance has a pointed arched doorway with a bell tower."

— Edith's Streets.

== History ==
The school opened in 1858 as the Hermitage school for boys, girls, and infants. Following the establishment of a new boys' school and then an infants' school this building became a girls' school in 1871.

== Current use ==
The hall is today used for a variety of community purposes including a school of dance and the Fowler Newsham Hall Counselling Project.
