= Junction Road railway station =

Former railway station in England

Junction Road
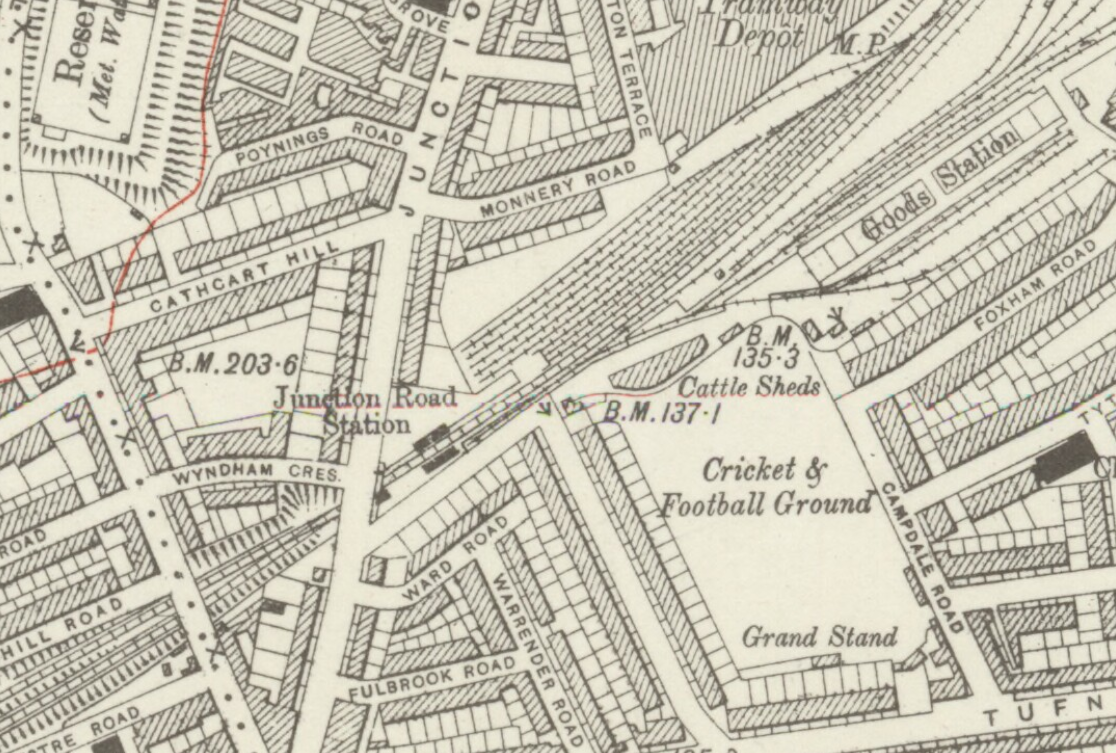
- Interactive map of Junction Road

General information
- Location: Tufnell Park
- Local authority: London Borough of Islington
- Owner: Tottenham and Hampstead Junction Railway
- Number of platforms: 2

Key dates
- 1 January 1872: Opened
- 3 May 1943: Closed

Other information
- Coordinates: 51.559°N 0.137°W

Junction Road railway station (originally Junction Road for Tufnell Park) was a railway station in London (1872–1943). The station was opened by the Tottenham and Hampstead Junction Railway.

It was at the corner of Junction Road and its purpose-built spur, Station Road, in N19 between the districts of Dartmouth Park and Tufnell Park then in the tapering north of the old parish of Islington.

It comprised two wooden platforms, accessed by means of a footbridge and stairs, and also served the nearby Tufnell Park goods depot.

Trains from the station generally ran between St Pancras or Kentish Town to Barking or Southend; however, over its history trains ran to a number of other locations including Cambridge, Chingford and Victoria.

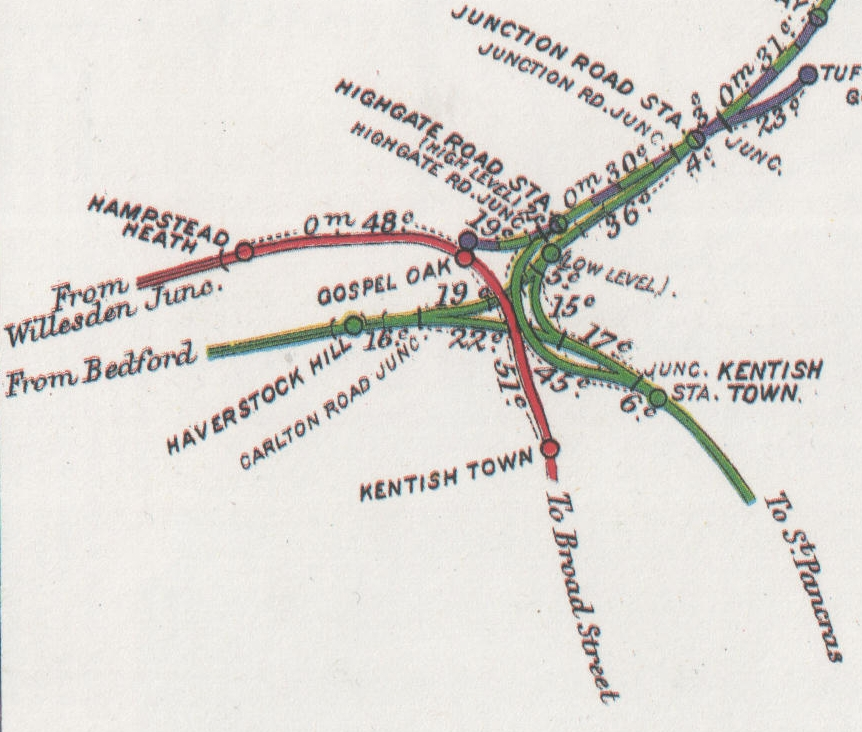
Railway lines around Junction Road station in 1914

It was initially very heavily used, mainly owing to the nearby Metropolitan Cattle Market; at its peak, it was used in 1902 by over 140,000 passengers. When the nearby Tufnell Park Underground station was opened on the Charing Cross, Euston and Hampstead Railway (now the Northern line), passenger levels dropped drastically; in a 1937 poem, John Betjeman set a dark poetic lament at "this lonely station". The station was closed on 3 May 1943 and demolished in the early 1950s; the only remaining evidence of the station are the name "Station Road" and the old Station Master's House on Junction Road.

The Gospel Oak to Barking line is the name for the current, longer line. Calls for this station to be rebuilt, offering an interchange with the Northern line were amassed and presented in 2013. The Mayor of London and Transport for London jointly replied in a standard response to unfunded proposals to non-needy areas in public transport. They had no plans to do so; they will keep the possibility under review.

Preceding station	Disused railways	Following station
Highgate Road (High Level) towards Gospel Oak or Kentish Town	Tottenham and Hampstead Junction Railway	Upper Holloway towards Barking
Highgate Road (Low Level) towards Haverstock Hill or Kentish Town	Tottenham and Hampstead Junction Railway	Upper Holloway towards Barking
