= Dartmouth Park =

Coordinates: 51.5638°N 0.14905°W

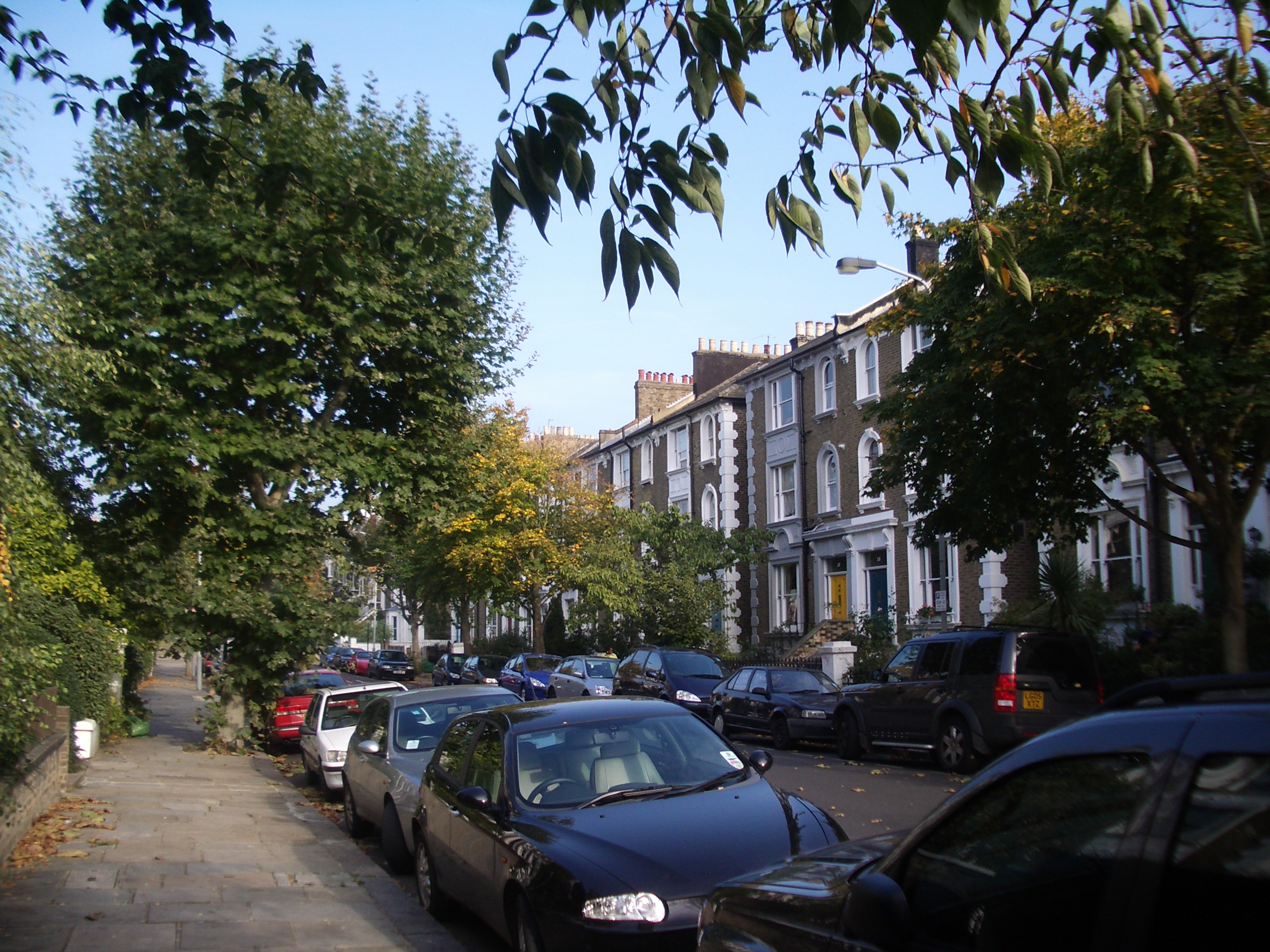
- Dartmouth Park Road

- Location within Greater London
- OS grid reference: TQ284867
- London borough: Camden
- Ceremonial county: Greater London
- Region: London
- Country: England
- Sovereign state: United Kingdom
- Post town: LONDON
- Postcode district: NW5
- Dialling code: 020
- Police: Metropolitan
- Fire: London
- Ambulance: London
- UK Parliament: Holborn and St Pancras
- London Assembly: Barnet and Camden

Dartmouth Park is a district of the London Borough of Camden, 6.0 km (3.7 mi) north of Charing Cross. The area adjoins Highgate and Highgate Cemetery (to the north), Kentish Town (to the south) and Hampstead Heath is to the west.

The nearest Underground stations are Tufnell Park and Archway, both on the Northern line. The nearest Overground station is Gospel Oak.

== History ==
Dartmouth Park is named after the Earl of Dartmouth who bought the land in St Pancras parish in the middle of the 18th century. The 5th Earl of Dartmouth allowed a wave of scrutinised house building in the late 19th century, with most later waves also subject to amenity-giving planning conditions and/or restrictive covenants, such as a limitation on density.

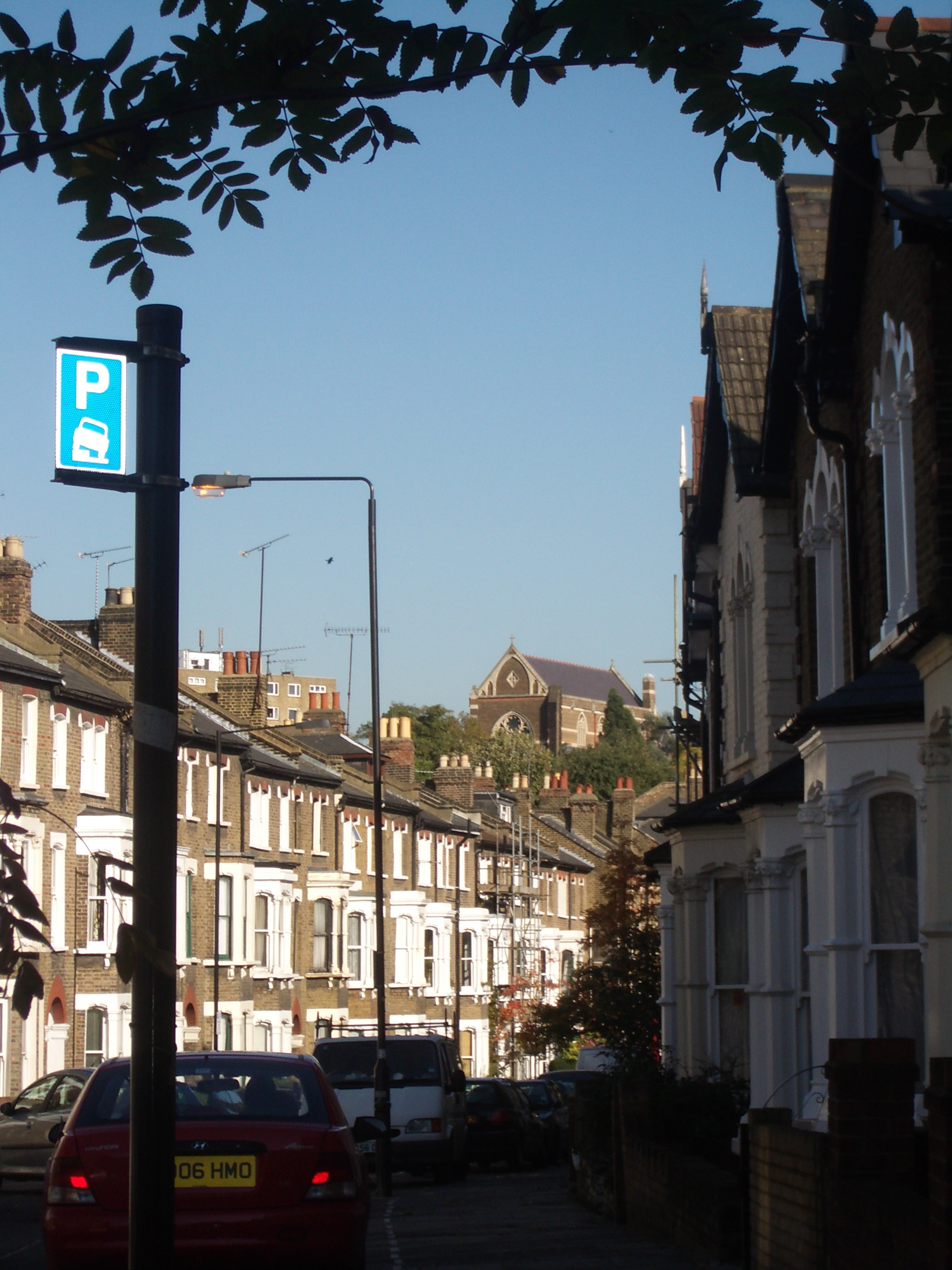
Chetwynd Road and St Mary Brookfield

By then the need to increase the supply of fresh water to serve London's growth meant that water companies were building new facilities. Two covered reservoirs were constructed on Maiden Lane (since renamed Dartmouth Park Hill) in 1855 by the New River Company and connected to its new waterworks and pumping station by Stoke Newington reservoirs, two boroughs to the east. Later owned by the Metropolitan Water Board, the reservoirs are now owned by Thames Water Utilities.

== Geography ==
=== Land use and housing ===
Dartmouth Park is a largely residential district, with most homes occupied by people on middle-to-higher incomes and, by Inner London standards, many retired people. Immediately north is the Holly Lodge Estate and then Highgate. Dartmouth Park is separated from Kentish Town to the south by the Gospel Oak to Barking (railway) line. Housing is predominantly detached, terraced and semi-detached houses, late Victorian and Edwardian mansion flats (notable examples include Brookfield Mansions and the blocks in Lissenden Gardens), and some post war housing such as Haddo House.

=== Parks ===
The former park demesne is reflected by Waterlow Park and Highgate Cemetery.

A small, landscaped park, Dartmouth Park, is immediately to the east in Islington, adjoining Dartmouth Park Hill. It was laid out on the edge of the reservoirs and opened to the public in 1972. Much of it is taken up by the reservoir tank. It has a children's playground. The top of the slope gives an open semi-panorama. The park has an enclosed seating area surrounded by a hedge, which local children helped to plant in 1991. The park hosted one of the beacons lit nationwide on 21 April 2016 to celebrate Queen Elizabeth II's 90th birthday.

=== Landmarks ===
The Anglican church is St Mary Brookfield, designed by William Butterfield and opened in 1875. It is red brick with contrasting yellow and blue brick patterns.

The street named York Rise, bisects the district, forming a gentle vale taken up by the Fleet stream then one of the successive Fleet combined sewers, each intercepted by Joseph Bazalgette's great interceptor sewers, before doing so crossing the railway tracks in a visible large iron pipe.

== Transport ==
London skyline from Dartmouth Park Hill. Image posted February 2015 with both 122 Leadenhall Street and 20 Fenchurch Street recently completed

=== Nearest places ===
- Archway
- Gospel Oak
- Hampstead Heath
- Highgate
- Kentish Town
- Tufnell Park

=== Nearest stations ===
- Gospel Oak
- Tufnell Park
- Archway
