= Tottenham and Hampstead Junction Railway =

Railway line in north London, England

Tottenham and Hampstead Junction Railway Act 1862
- Act of Parliament
- Parliament of the United Kingdom
- Long title: An Act for making a Railway to be called "The Tottenham and Hampstead Junction Railway," and for other Purposes.
- Citation: 25 & 26 Vict. c. cc

Dates
- Royal assent: 29 July 1862

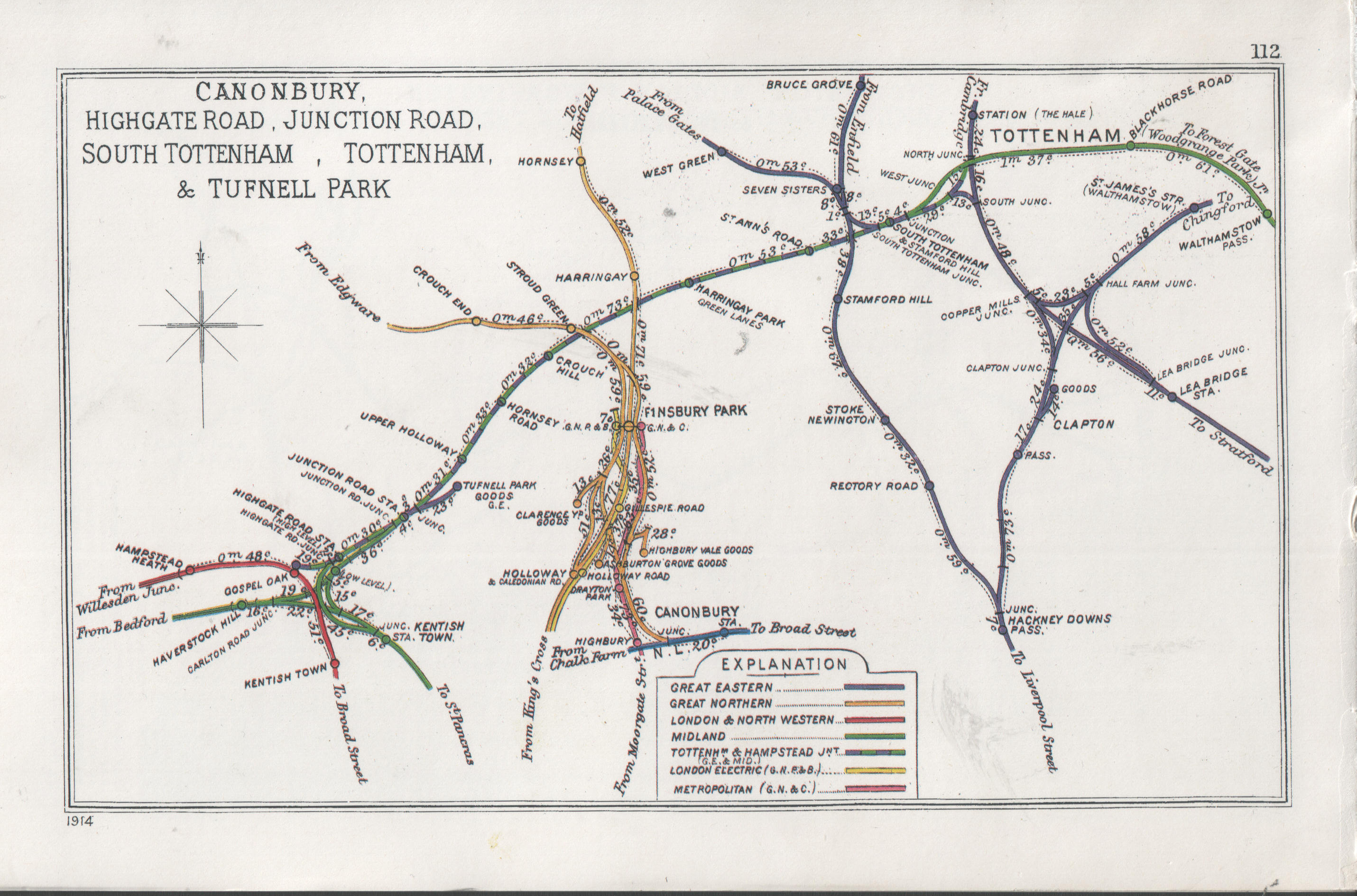
Map dated 1914, showing the line as "Tottenhm & Hampstead Jnt"

The Tottenham and Hampstead Junction Railway was a railway line in north London, formed by an act of Parliament, the Tottenham and Hampstead Junction Railway Act 1862 (25 & 26 Vict. c. cc) of 28 July 1862, which today is mostly part of the Gospel Oak to Barking line. It was effectively part of an attempt by the Great Eastern Railway to obtain a west end terminus to complement Bishopsgate railway station in east London.

The line opened on 21 July 1868 between Tottenham North Junction (on the Great Eastern Railway) and Highgate Road. An extension to Kentish Town opened in 1870. An extension to Gospel Oak opened on 4 June 1888.

== History ==
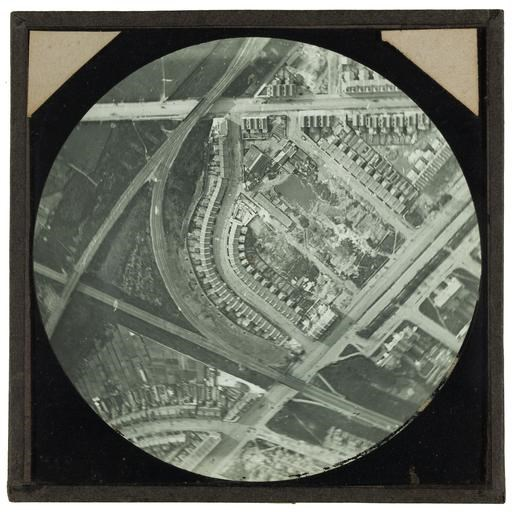
Aerial view by Cecil Shadbolt, showing Seven Sisters Curve, part of the Tottenham and Hampstead Junction Railway, taken from 2,000 feet (610 m) on 29 May 1892 - the earliest extant aerial photograph taken in the British Isles.

Even before it opened, the line had problems. Plans to extend the western end of this line via a proposed 'London Main Trunk Railway', underneath Hampstead Road, the Metropolitan Railway (modern Circle line) and Tottenham Court Road, to Charing Cross were rejected by Parliament in 1864. Instead it was decided to terminate the line at Gospel Oak. The line opened in 1868 with the Great Eastern Railway operating a service between Highgate Road and Fenchurch Street via Tottenham.

Tottenham and Hampstead Junction Railway (Abandonment) Act 1870
- Act of Parliament
- Parliament of the United Kingdom
- Long title: An Act for the Abandonment of the Railways authorised by "The Tottenham and Hampstead Junction Railway Act, 1866;" and for other purposes.
- Citation: 33 & 34 Vict. c. cix

Dates
- Royal assent: 4 July 1870

Text of statute as originally enacted

With a very indirect route into central London at one end and no interchange at all at the other, the service was a commercial failure and the planned link to Gospel Oak was never completed. The service ceased operation entirely in January 1870 and a local act, the Tottenham and Hampstead Junction Railway (Abandonment) Act 1870 (33 & 34 Vict. c. cix) was passed in August abandoning the railway in its original form.

During 1870, a branch was constructed to Kentish Town and the line reopened as part of the Midland Railway in October, initially running between Moorgate and Crouch Hill via Kentish Town. In 1872 this was extended to South Tottenham & Stamford Hill. This provided an interchange with the Palace Gates Line. A number of new stations were opened, many of them close to existing stations. Most of these were closed in the 1940s.

In 1888, the line was extended to Gospel Oak (as originally planned) although the Kentish Town branch remained the primary route and the Gospel Oak link was abandoned in 1926.

In 1894 the Tottenham & Forest Gate Railway opened and the service was extended east of South Tottenham & Stamford Hill to Barking and, occasionally, beyond.

Tottenham and Hampstead Junction Railway Act 1901
- Act of Parliament
- Parliament of the United Kingdom
- Long title: An Act for empowering the Tottenham and Hampstead Junction Railway Company to widen a portion of their railway and for other purposes.
- Citation: 1 Edw. 7. c. cxv

Dates
- Royal assent: 26 July 1901

In 1901, a bill was passed as the Tottenham and Hampstead Junction Railway Act 1901 (1 Edw. 7. c. cxv) authorising the widening of the railway and other improvements. This was followed by a bill in 1902, the Midland Railway Act 1902 (2 Edw. 7. c. cli) which gave the Great Eastern and Midland railways joint ownership of the line. The line, along with the rest of Britain's railways, was nationalised in 1948 and became part of British Rail.

In 1981, the Kentish Town branch was closed and the link to Gospel Oak reinstated. For more recent history see the Gospel Oak to Barking line.

== Stations ==
The line had the following stations (listed from east to west using the original station names):

- Tottenham (existing, service abandoned 1870)
- South Tottenham & Stamford Hill (existing) (added 1872, replacing Tottenham) [now called 'South Tottenham']
- St Ann's Road (new) (opened 1882, closed 1942)
- Green Lanes (new) (opened 1880) [now called 'Harringay Green Lanes']
- Crouch Hill (new)
- Hornsey Road (new) (opened 1872, closed 1943)
- Upper Holloway (new)
- Junction Road (new) (opened 1872, closed 1943)
- Branch:

- Highgate Road {Low Level} (new) (opened 1900, closed 1918)
- Kentish Town (existing, added 1870, line abandoned 1981)

- Highgate Road {High Level} (new) (closed 1915)
- Gospel Oak (existing, added 1888, abandoned 1926, line reopened 1981)

== Current status ==
The branch to Kentish Town closed in 1981 because there was not track capacity at Kentish Town because of the introduction of the Thameslink electrification project. The remainder of the line now forms part of the Gospel Oak to Barking line, part of the London Overground.
