= Gospel Oak to Barking line =

Railway line in London, England

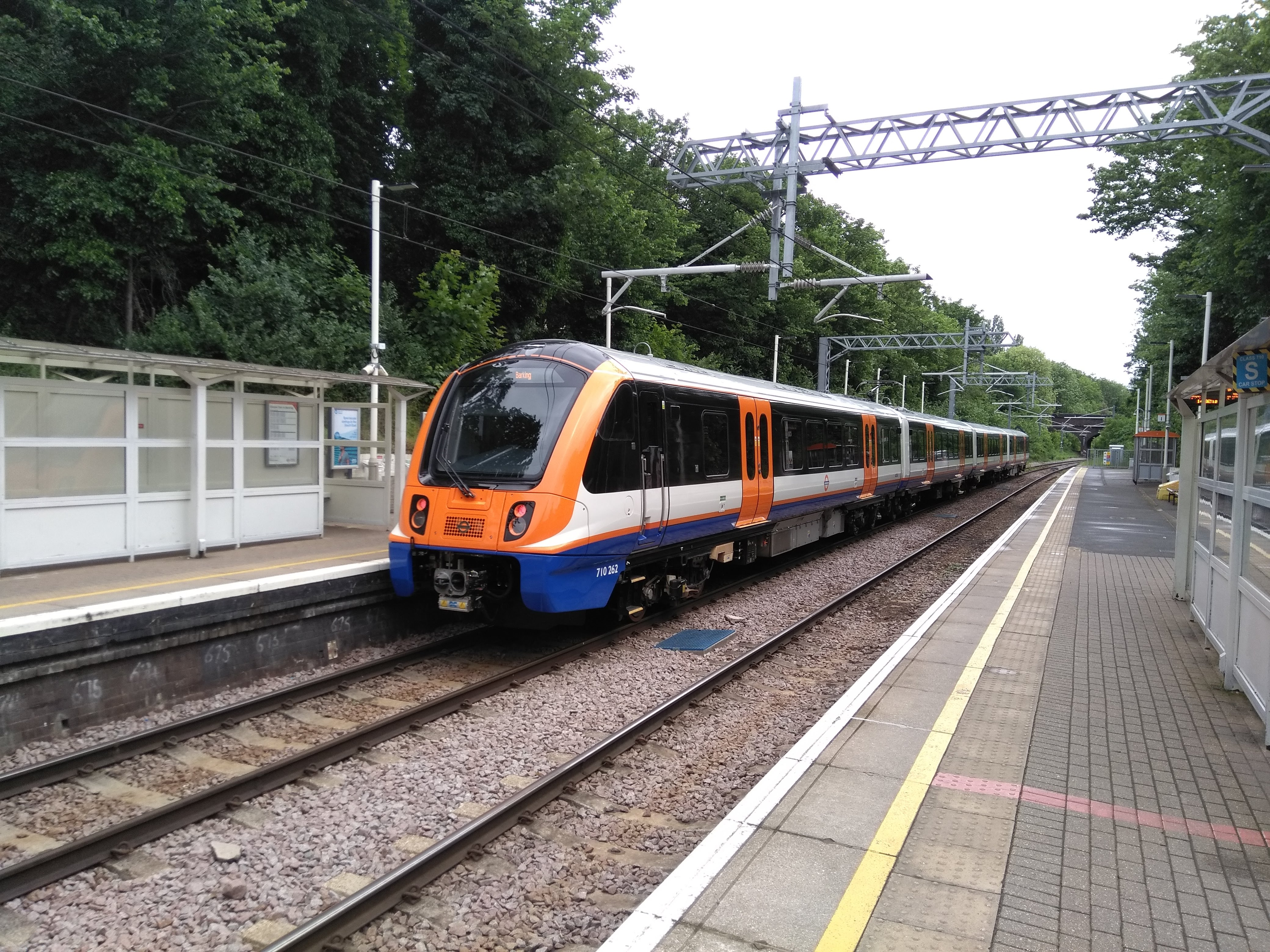
- A London Overground Class 710 Aventra departing Crouch Hill in 2019

Overview
- Status: Operational
- Owner: Network Rail
- Locale: Greater London
- Termini: Gospel Oak; Barking Riverside
- Stations: 13

Service
- Type: Suburban rail and goods
- System: National Rail
- Services: 1
- Operator: London Overground
- Rolling stock: Class 710 "Aventra"

Technical
- Line length: 13 miles 58 chains (22.1 km)
- Num of tracks: 2
- Track gauge: 4 ft 8 1/2 in (1,435 mm) standard gauge
- Electrification: Series 2 25 kV AC OHLE
Route map
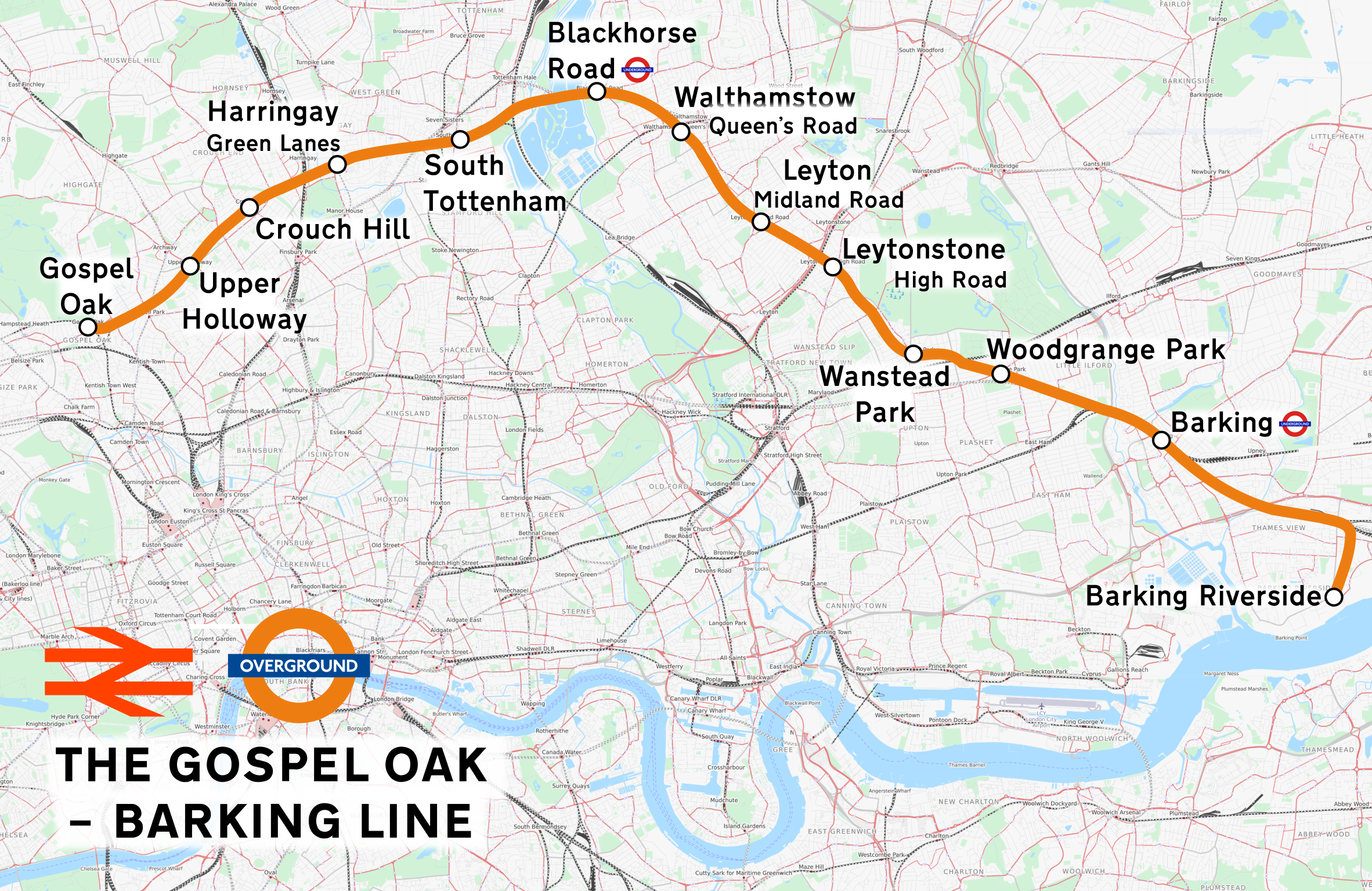
(Click to expand)

The Gospel Oak to Barking line, sometimes shortened to GOBLIN, is a railway line in London, England. It is 13 miles 58 chains (22.1 km) in length and carries through goods trains and London Overground passenger trains. The line is part of Network Rail Strategic Route 6, and is classified as a London and South East Commuter line.

The London Overground service which runs on the line, connecting Gospel Oak in north London and Barking Riverside in east London, is branded as the Suffragette line. The name came into use in November 2024.

For much of its existence the line has played a minor role in London's transport system; however, in recent years it has received significant investment to increase its capacity, including full 25kV AC overhead electrification, completed in 2018. At the eastern end of the line, the extension to the Barking Riverside regeneration site opened on 18 July 2022.

== History ==
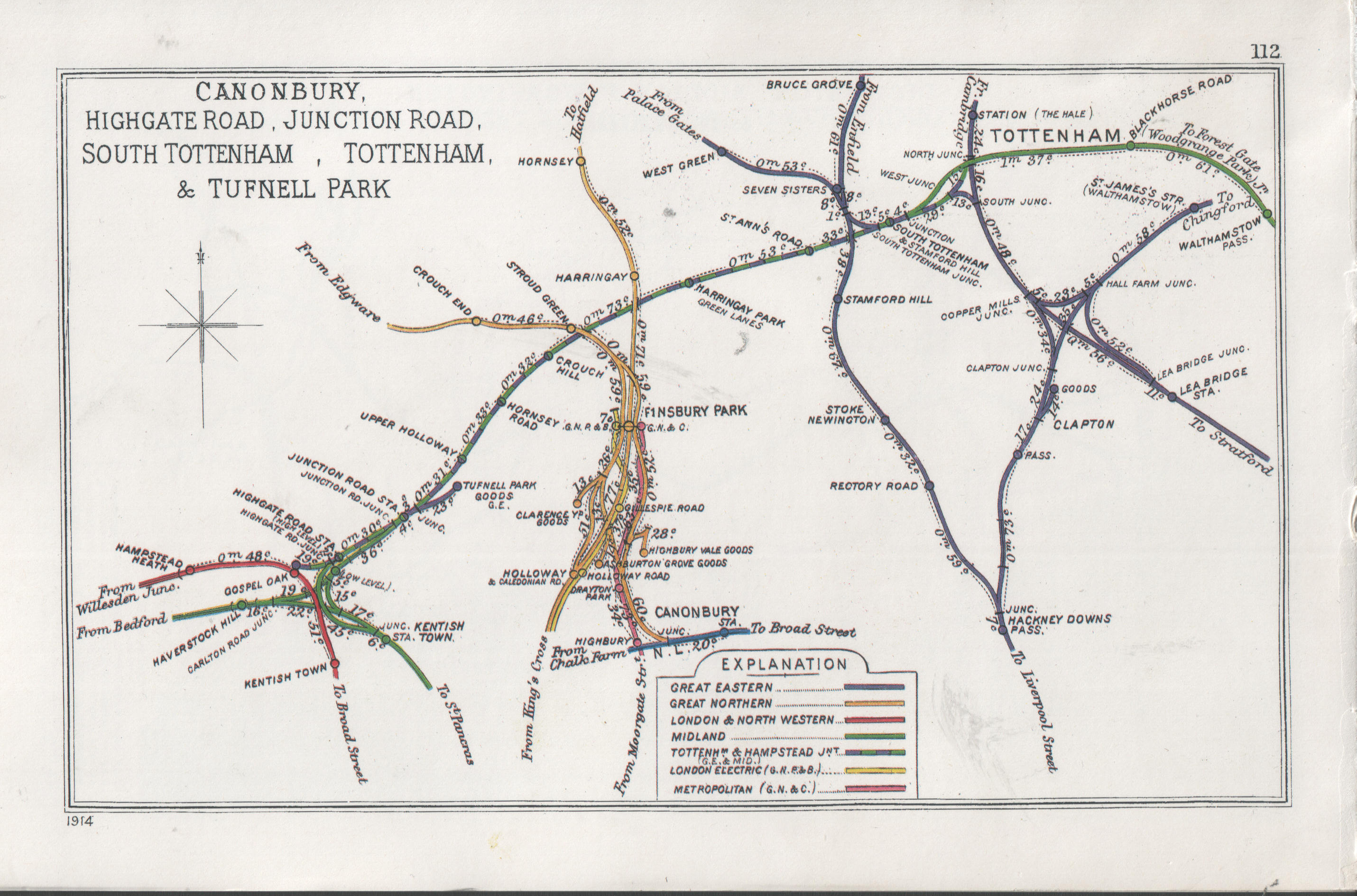
A 1914 map of the Tottenham and Hampstead Junction Railway

=== Original lines ===
The line is mostly an amalgamation of lines built in the 19th century. The main section, between South Tottenham and Woodgrange Park, was built as the Tottenham and Forest Gate Railway, a joint project between the Midland Railway and the London, Tilbury and Southend Railway. This opened on 9 July 1894, linking the Midland and Great Eastern joint line at South Tottenham and the Forest Gate and Barking line at Woodgrange Park. The section west of South Tottenham was built as the Tottenham and Hampstead Junction Railway, which opened in 1868 but had not been commercially successful as a stand-alone railway.

=== Predecessor routes ===
Although the route between Upper Holloway and Woodgrange Park has been constant, several stations have been the ends of the line. Kentish Town, St Pancras, Gospel Oak and Moorgate (via St Pancras) have all been the western termini. East Ham was an alternative eastern terminus for some time. Some trains were extended beyond Barking to destinations such as Southend and Tilbury. There was a regular boat train service between St Pancras and Tilbury.

A connection to Gospel Oak was added in 1888, but the routes via Kentish Town remained the primary ones and the Gospel Oak branch was abandoned during 1926. The connection to East Ham was abandoned in 1958.

The Tottenham and Hampstead Junction Railway section of the line had stations that were closed due to proximity to other stations or for other reasons. These include Highgate Road (closed 1918), Junction Road (closed 1943), Hornsey Road (closed 1943) and St Ann's Road (closed 1942).

The line was considered for closure to passengers in 1963 as part of the Beeching Axe, but local users protested and formed an action group to prevent closure. Beeching's proposals for London were not implemented for the most part, and the line remained open. Even so, it was allowed to fall into a poor state of repair and reliability, and by 1980 had been cut back to an hourly service between Kentish Town and Barking. The station canopies were gradually demolished, ticket offices closed and staff withdrawn from stations.

=== New link to Gospel Oak ===
During 1981, the situation began to improve when electrification and upgrades to the line out of St Pancras (later part of Thameslink) displaced the line from Kentish Town. A new link to Gospel Oak was built and the hourly service from Kentish Town was replaced by the current route from Gospel Oak with two trains per hour. The service remained relatively unreliable, largely due to the age of the rolling stock used, which were initially Class 115 and 108 units, replaced in the early 1990s by Class 117 and 121 units.

=== Private operators ===
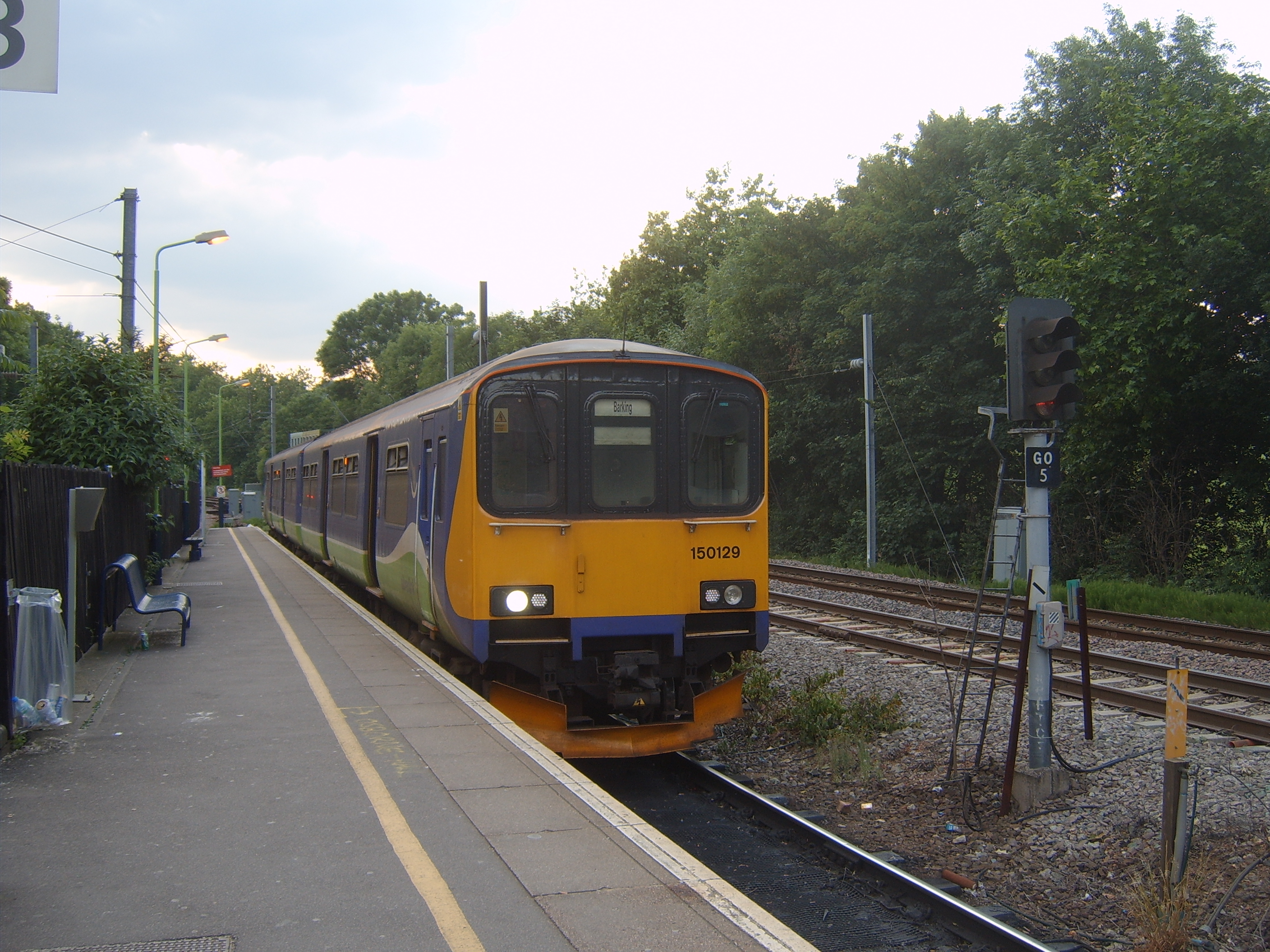
A Silverlink Class 150 at Gospel Oak

Initially part of British Rail Network SouthEast, the line was privatised in 1994, the track being owned by Railtrack (subsequently Network Rail) with the passenger service provided by the North London Railways franchise. This passed to National Express in 1997, which operated the line under the brand name Silverlink until November 2007. Under Silverlink, the slam door trains were replaced by Class 150 units in 2000, which improved reliability significantly. There were minor improvements in station facilities (such as CCTV and information points) but no major investment to upgrade the line and boost capacity, and the stations remained unstaffed.

=== London Overground ===
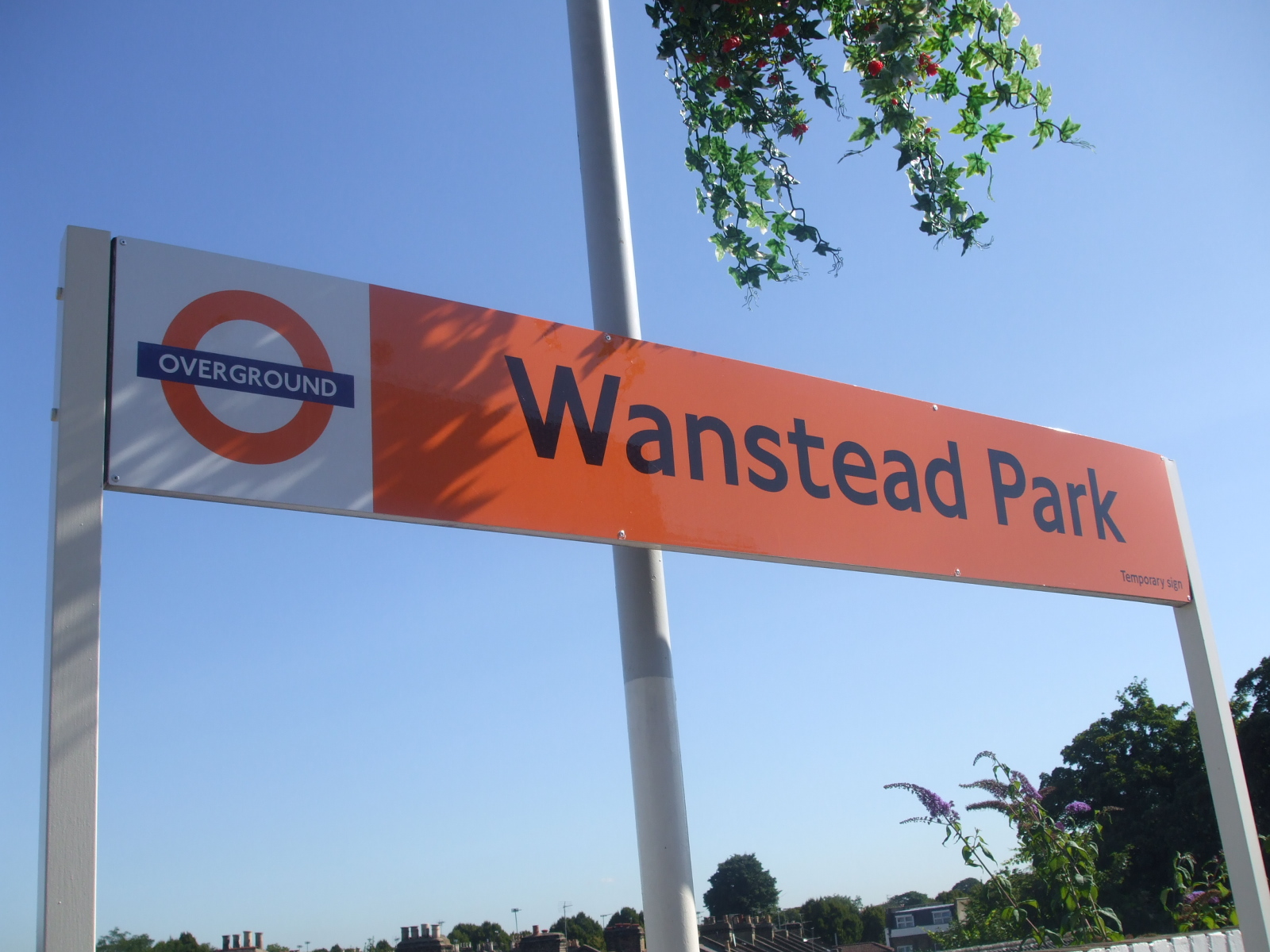
Early London Overground branded signage at Wanstead Park

During the opening years of the twenty-first century, many lines within London were running at full capacity, and as a consequence the line took on a new strategic significance as a bypass, relieving load on other lines by allowing passengers to travel between north and east London directly.

The Railways Act 2005 abolished the franchise and gave the operation of passenger services to Transport for London (TfL). During 2005, TfL started funding a small number of additional peak time and late evening services to relieve the worst overcrowding.

In November 2007, TfL took full control of the line, after which it introduced improved late night and weekend services, and staff, ticket machines and Oyster equipment at all stations. The frequency was increased to three trains per hour during morning and afternoon peaks and the line was included on the Tube map for the first time.

The line was closed throughout most of September 2008 for upgrade work carried out by Network Rail. Capacity was increased from six trains per hour to eight (four each for passenger and goods trains). By replacing the overbridges carrying Sussex Way and Albert Road, and lowering the track in some other locations, it was made possible for W10 loading gauge goods trains to operate. Electrification was not included.

In 2010, eight new Class 172 Turbostar diesel trains replaced the Class 150 units, with two 23-metre coaches and the option to introduce a third coach. The service frequency was increased to four trains per hour in January 2011.

==== Electrification ====
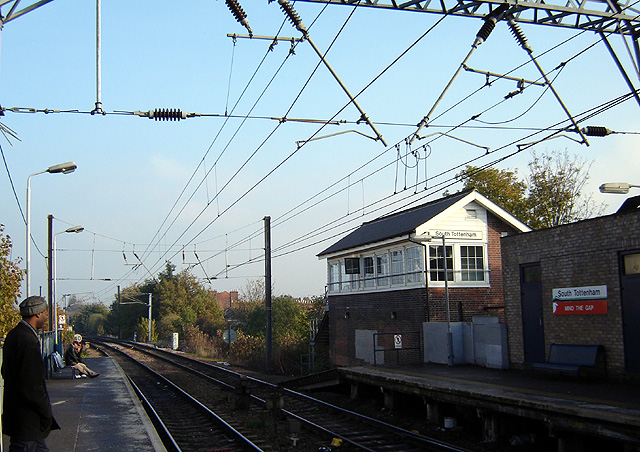
The electrified stretch at South Tottenham (completed before the rest of the line)

During 2008, electrification was ruled out by the Mayor of London on grounds of cost and difficulty of electrifying a line with so many viaducts and bridges, but the Network Route Utilisation Strategy published by Network Rail in October 2009 showed a benefit–cost ratio for the scheme of 2.4:1. During 2012, the Mayor of London, Boris Johnson, indicated that funding was "a matter for the Department for Transport".

In 2011, Network Rail proposed electrification in Control Period 5 (CP5), however, in July 2012, Justine Greening, the Secretary of State for Transport, stated that electrification was not included in the High Level Output Specification for CP5, and that any funds would need to be provided by TfL. In August, the Mayor wrote to the Secretary of State for Transport to seek a way forward, and "she committed her officials to support work with TfL, Network Rail, train operators and other industry parties to see if a viable way can be found to bridge the funding gap."

During November 2012, the magazine Modern Railways reported that the Department for Transport had ruled out the work on the basis of an estimated cost of £90 million, in contrast to an estimate of £40 million by TfL.

In June 2013, it was announced that £115 million of funding for electrification would be made available as part of upgrades to rail infrastructure included in the government's 2013 spending round. At the same time Transport for London announced that they had obtained a £90m commitment from the Chancellor of the Exchequer and the Secretary of State for Transport.

In September 2015, Network Rail awarded the £56.9 million contract to electrify the line to J. Murphy & Sons. There were part closures (at weekends and from South Tottenham to Barking) from June to late September 2016, followed by a full closure from October 2016 to February 2017. In February 2017, Network Rail announced that whilst the line would re-open as scheduled, they were not able to complete all the work planned due to "incorrect" designs and late delivery of materials. Further evening and weekend works until late June 2017 were already planned, followed by around four months of commissioning work before the electric wires could be turned on so that Class 710 trains could run. Although the line was completely electrified by mid-January 2018, delays prevented the introduction of new electric trains until 2019.

The line was electrified using the NR Series 2 OLE (Overhead Line Equipment) range.

==== New trains ====
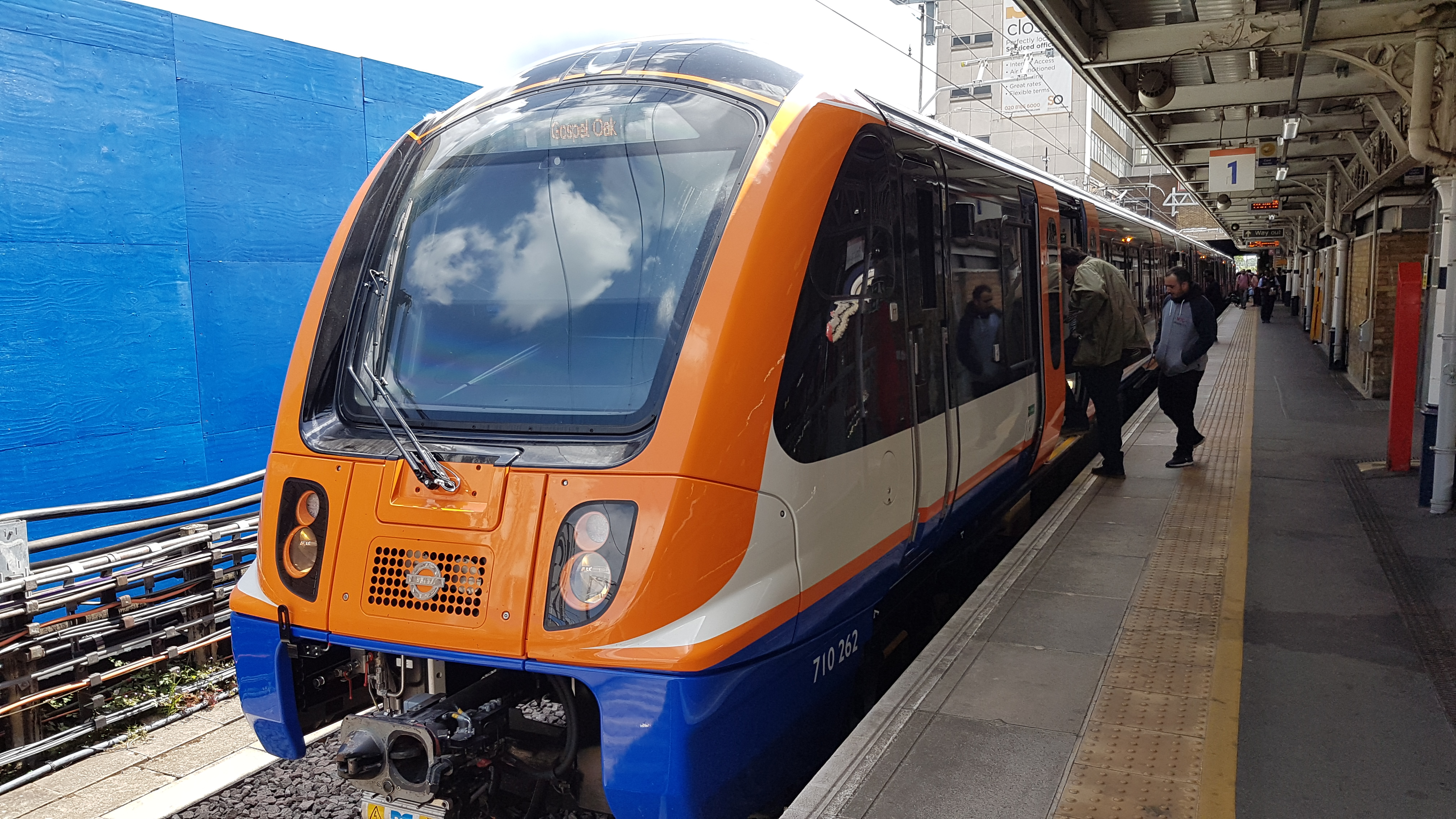
A Class 710 four-coach electric train at Barking station

On account of the completion of electrification in 2018, new electric Class 710 trains were supposed to run from March 2018. However, the delivery of these trains was delayed by the manufacturer; at one point, officials were not even willing to divulge an anticipated service date for the Class 710 sets.

Due to the Class 172 units being needed by West Midlands Trains, three Class 378 units (378 206, 378 209 and 378 232) were moved from other parts of the London Overground and shortened down from five to four carriages to provide an interim service until the class 710 units entered service. However, six trains are needed to be able to run a full service, so from 15 March 2019 (the day the last Class 172 units left London Overground) the frequency on the line was halved to two trains per hour.

Increases in passenger numbers led to severe overcrowding at peak times, but it was not possible to increase peak frequencies without reducing the number of goods trains, as the line could accommodate only eight trains per hour in each direction. The two-coach Class 172 diesel trains in use between 2010 and 2019 were incapable of handling the increased number of passengers experienced after the incorporation into the London Overground. Between 2016 and 2018 the line was electrified by Network Rail; this work was delayed due to a number of design, track works and delivery problems. At the same time, platforms were lengthened to accommodate the new four-coach electric Class 710 trains. These trains were intended to be introduced in the spring of 2018, but the delivery was delayed by the manufacturer, the first two entering service on 23 May 2019, but the existing two trains per hour service was maintained until the full timetable was restored in June of that year. The full fleet entered service in August 2019. Because the delay caused timetable cutbacks and continued overcrowding, TfL offered a month's free travel, financed by the manufacturer Bombardier, to compensate passengers for the months of disruption they experienced.

==== Extension to Barking Riverside ====
The line was extended southeast by 4.5 kilometres (2.8 mi) from the terminus at Barking to serve the Barking Riverside regeneration area, a brownfield site with permission for around 10,800 new homes. Proposed in the mid 2010s following cancellation of the DLR extension to Dagenham Dock, the extension was approved in 2017, leading to construction commencing during late 2018. Running partially alongside the existing London, Tilbury and Southend Railway line and then a new viaduct to the Barking Riverside station, the extension opened to passengers on Monday 18 July 2022 at an estimated cost of £327m.

=== Accidents and incidents ===
On 23 January 2020, a freight wagon derailed between Leyton Midland Road and Walthamstow Queen's Road stations, causing extensive damage to more than 2.5 miles (4 km) of track; the line was closed between Barking and South Tottenham stations while repair works took place, whereby 10,000 tonnes of ballast, 5,300 concrete sleepers and 39 new pieces of rail were installed. The line re-opened on 19 February 2020.

== Current operations ==
=== Stations ===
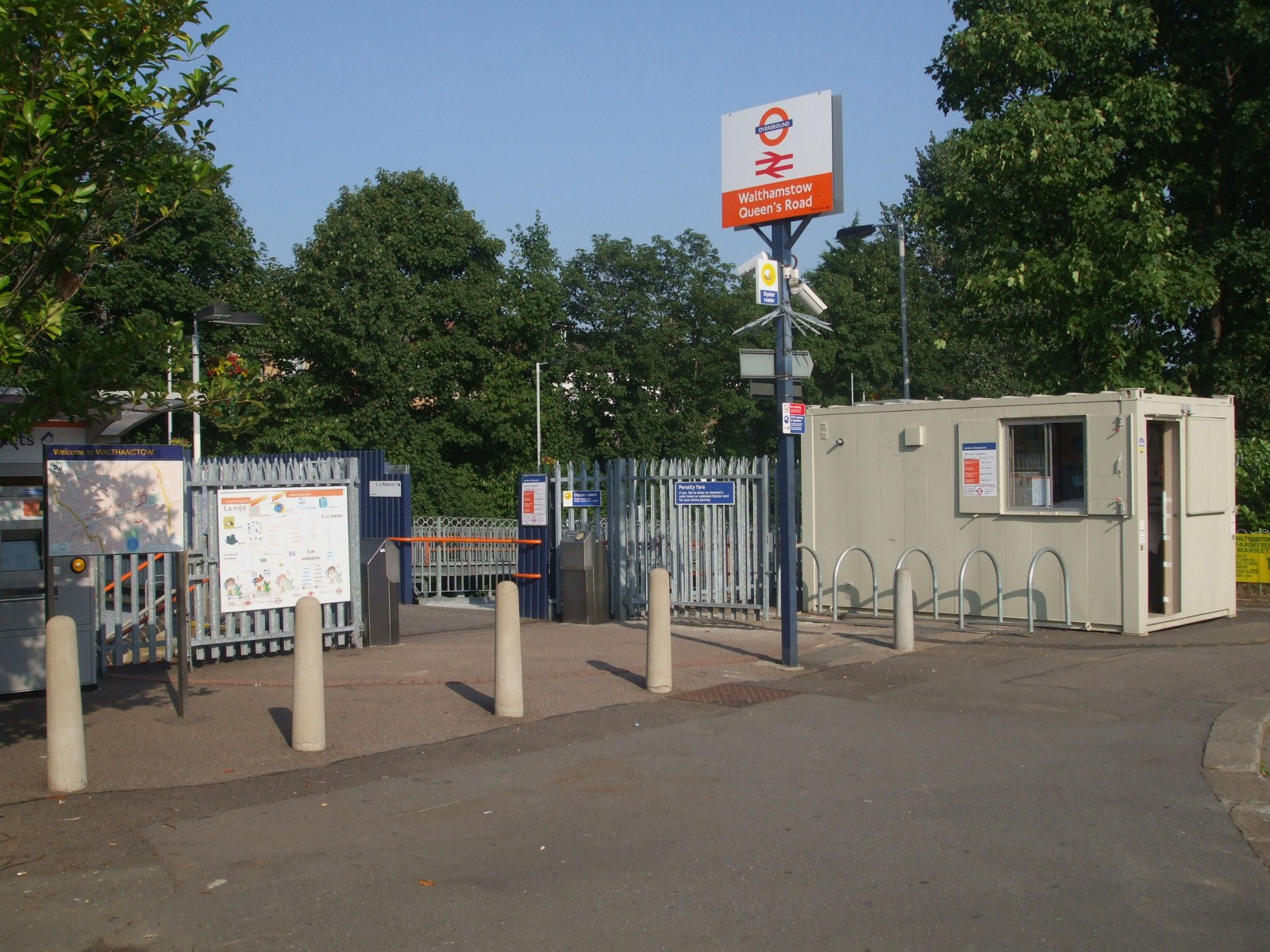
Walthamstow Queens Road station entrance

The line has thirteen stations, eleven of which are managed by London Overground, one by c2c (Barking) and one by London Underground (Blackhorse Road).

- Gospel Oak
- Upper Holloway
- Crouch Hill
- Harringay Green Lanes
- South Tottenham
- Blackhorse Road
- Walthamstow Queen's Road
- Leyton Midland Road
- Leytonstone High Road
- Wanstead Park
- Woodgrange Park
- Barking
- Barking Riverside

==== Station facilities ====
Except at the interchange stations, station facilities are very basic. There are small shelters, information points with recorded service information, information screens and CCTV cameras. Typically, there are one or two staff members on duty. Where there are no station buildings they operate out of container-sized portable offices.

==== Step-free access ====
The line has some stations with step-free access, allowing wheelchairs/pushchairs etc. easy access from street level to the platforms, at Gospel Oak, Upper Holloway, Harringay Green Lanes, South Tottenham, Walthamstow Queens Road, Barking and Barking Riverside.

As the trains do not align exactly with the platform height, wheelchair users require assistance from a member of staff to board or alight from trains. The only exception however is at the newest station on the line, Barking Riverside, built with level access.

=== Services ===
The line carries both goods and passenger traffic. It is owned by Network Rail, with the exception of the Barking Riverside branch which is owned by Transport for London.

Passenger services on the line are operated by Arriva Rail London as part of the London Overground network under contract to TfL. There are four trains per hour in each direction, running from around 06:30 to 23:30 on Monday to Saturday, and around 06:30 to 22:00 on Sundays. There is a single weekday morning service from Woodgrange Park to Willesden Junction, calling at all intermediate stations except for Gospel Oak.

The line is heavily used by freight as it provides part of an orbital route around London, connecting with many radial routes and the North London Line at Gospel Oak. Freight services are operated by DB Cargo UK, GB Railfreight and Freightliner.

Other services use parts of the line infrequently, or as a diversionary route, but do not stop at most stations:

- c2c operates a few services on the east end of the line through Woodgrange Park
- London Overground runs a single Saturday service timetabled to connect Tottenham South Junction and Seven Sisters on Lea Valley routes passing through, but not calling at, South Tottenham station

The line has an active users' group, "The Barking–Gospel Oak Rail User Group".

==== Renaming ====
In July 2023, mayor of London Sadiq Khan announced that the six Overground services would be given unique names, relevant to the "historical contributions by minority groups" of the areas the services pass through, by the end of the following year.

On 15 February 2024, it was confirmed that the service using the Gospel Oak to Barking line would be named the Suffragette line, to honour East London's major contribution to the Suffragette movement. Barking activist Annie Huggett, who died in 1996 at the age of 104, was known as "The Last Suffragette" due to her great age. The line will be coloured green on the updated network map; green, along with white and purple, was one of the colours of the Suffragette movement.

=== Ticketing ===
Except at interchange stations, staffed ticket offices were withdrawn by BR in the late 1980s. With operations transferred to London Overground, self-service ticket machines were introduced in November 2007. Oyster- and contactless-card validators (for touching in and out) are at all stations. The ticket machines can be used to load credit onto Oyster cards. Passengers are required to buy tickets, or touch in with their Oyster or contactless cards, or else face a penalty fare.

Owing to the lack of ticket barriers and the difficulty of ticket verification when trains are crowded, the line has historically had a high level of fare avoidance. Under Silverlink most stations lacked any ticket purchasing facilities. In theory, passengers could purchase tickets from the conductors on the trains, but it was not always possible to do this. Following the introduction of the current ticketing arrangements, ticketless travel fell from an estimated peak of 40% under Silverlink, to 2% in March 2008.

=== Passenger volume ===
The number of paying passengers has increased very significantly since London Overground assumed the line's management.

This is the passenger volume for the years beginning April 2002 to April 2023.

Station usage
Station name	2002–03	2004–05	2005–06	2006–07	2007–08	2008–09	2009–10	2010–11	2011–12	2012–13	2013–14	2014–15	2015–16	2016–17	2017–18	2018–19	2019–20	2020–21	2021–22	2022–23	2023–24	2024–25
Gospel Oak	627,750	340,980	397,700	1,511,609	922,699	1,052,692	956,474	1,508,264	2,198,128	2,755,214	3,498,058	3,568,772	2,629,076	2,355,852	2,379,460	2,699,604	2,458,922	1,112,612	2,005,642	2,223,682		
Upper Holloway	189,632	52,331	47,992	206,090	204,715	283,884	285,272	505,822	736,306	900,538	1,086,512	1,166,102	1,291,668	415,180	696,286	1,088,442	974,102	594,500	1,063,258	1,159,000		
Crouch Hill	72,727	45,251	44,680	271,491	152,633	189,696	171,598	321,100	497,964	636,424	789,704	832,150	825,262	284,672	469,790	706,722	596,958	353,194	668,250	726,486		
Harringay Green Lanes	No data	36,457	34,052	319,250	228,338	299,934	273,160	502,600	762,442	955,660	1,189,990	1,292,534	1,395,266	408,558	722,864	1,075,256	927,894	617,572	1,025,222	1,106,422		
South Tottenham	135,208	45,834	42,090	243,519	183,840	232,748	225,126	441,988	657,598	799,950	1,001,870	1,046,516	1,379,768	409,534	748,758	1,168,598	948,036	683,162	1,054,286	1,129,644		
Blackhorse Road	No data	26,143	22,593	169,067	86,550	69,904	184,472	444,802	669,050	828,002	813,532	1,101,636	2,013,700	774,220	1,428,396	2,014,394	1,838,242	972,286	1,753,120	1,932,462		
Walthamstow Queen's Road	76,675	34,379	30,503	62,520	68,681	69,418	86,904	216,142	334,630	405,656	458,732	541,314	945,750	218,732	500,768	734,832	644,254	404,150	689,920	764,968		
Leyton Midland Road	110,046	34,865	32,407	285,208	224,047	308,836	302,722	501,186	749,488	951,730	1,182,122	1,355,070	1,340,438	286,620	795,236	1,178,122	1,014,328	631,408	1,101,844	1,193,380		
Leytonstone High Road	60,227	31,542	26,724	261,238	224,047	251,676	244,624	416,310	587,078	733,060	858,864	1,001,820	977,634	210,496	570,554	837,232	709,980	437,732	801,860	841,092		
Wanstead Park	52,477	29,014	25,717	179,718	147,521	215,262	213,644	351,450	505,344	627,170	767,308	845,926	1,013,078	212,572	563,186	886,990	769,666	517,316	871,416	890,942		
Woodgrange Park	52,320	29,090	25,256	173,771	115,969	168,434	171,972	310,006	484,632	602,428	702,302	750,758	977,648	196,244	513,594	764,606	629,330	453,500	731,542	775,936		
Barking	4,687,665	5,121,894	4,908,499	3,762,562	3,559,402	3,753,582	4,677,952	6,515,606	7,427,422	8,072,356	8,330,632	9,675,012	13,428,608	12,786,542	13,473,374	14,451,652	13,831,488	6,742,918	11,231,850	12,730,212		
Barking Riverside	—N/a	—N/a	—N/a	—N/a	—N/a	—N/a	—N/a	—N/a	—N/a	—N/a	—N/a	—N/a	—N/a	—N/a	—N/a	—N/a	—N/a	—N/a	—N/a	461,384		
The annual passenger usage is based on sales of tickets in stated financial years from Office of Rail and Road estimates of station usage. The statistics are for passengers arriving and departing from each station and cover twelve-month periods that start in April. Methodology may vary year on year. Usage since the period 2019–20 have been affected by the COVID-19 pandemic, especially the period 2020–23.

==== Notes ====
- The large increases in the year beginning April 2006 were partly due to travelcards for National Rail journeys being made from stations that have only a London Underground office and also using a different methodology to estimate likely journeys made from National Rail stations in Zone 1.
- The large increases in the year beginning April 2010 were partly due to Oyster Cards being introduced in January 2010, and new rolling stock.
- Usage of the Gospel Oak to Barking line on the London Overground reduced as a result of engineering works throughout the year. Work included a full closure between October 2016 and February 2017.
- Barking Riverside opened in 2022.

=== Trains ===
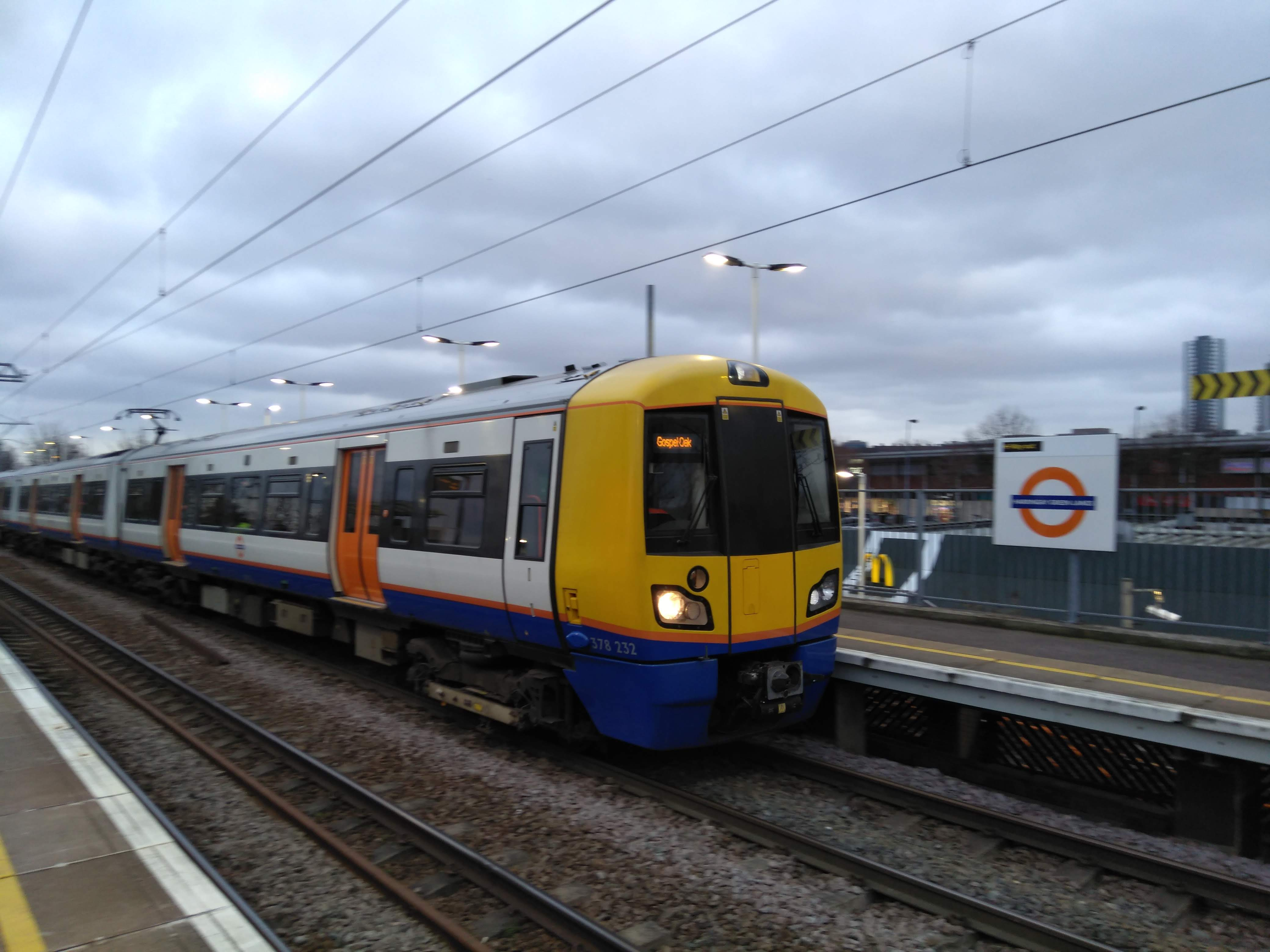
Class 378 at Harringay Green Lanes station

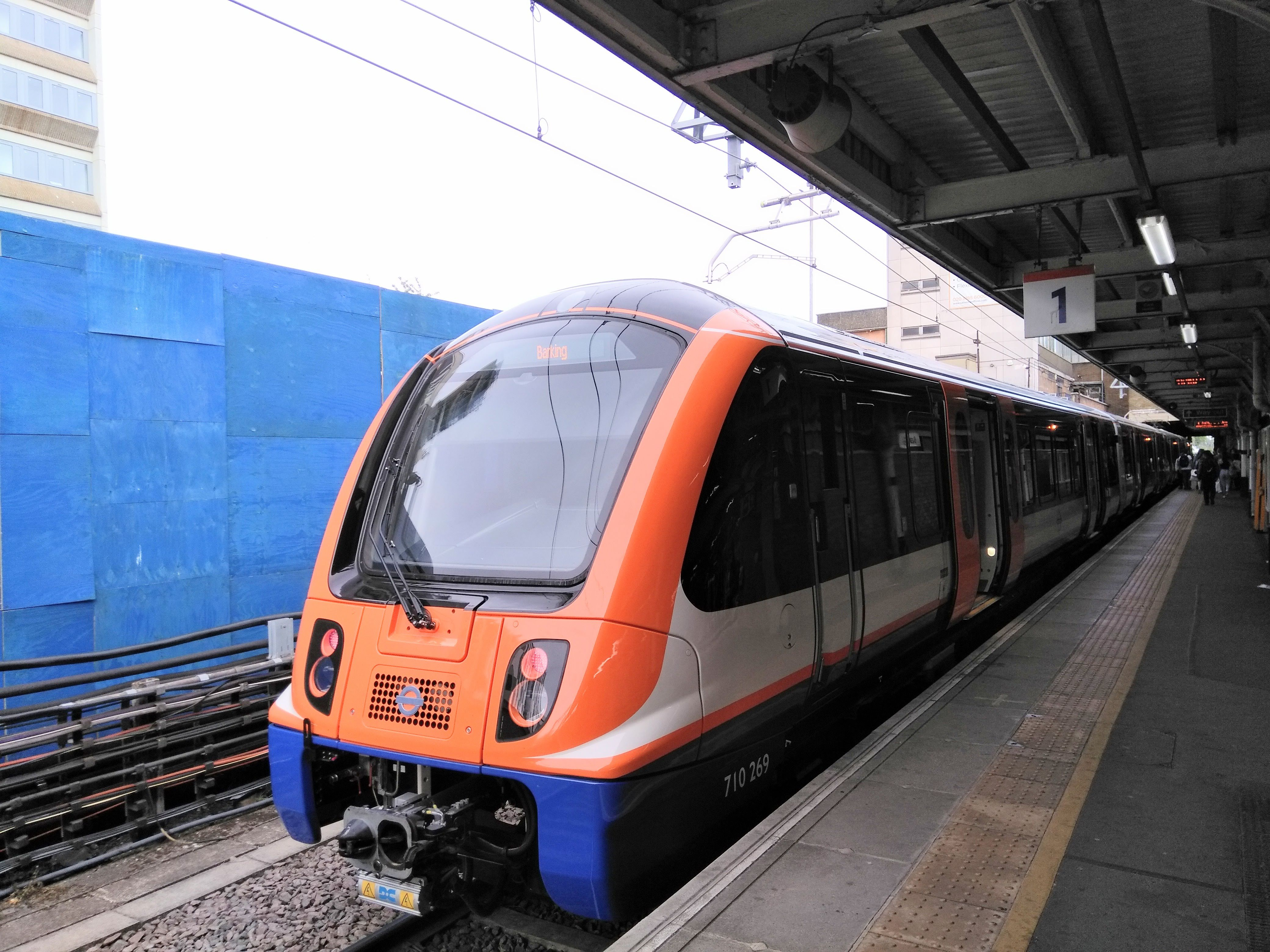
Class 710 standing at Barking

Until 2010 London Overground operated six Class 150 two-coach diesel units on the line. They were replaced by eight Class 172/0 two-coach diesel multiple units (DMUs).

In 2017, all trains were diesel powered as the line was not fully electrified, with only two short sections having overhead electrification, at South Tottenham, to provide a link from Seven Sisters to Stratford, and from the junction with the Great Eastern Main Line to Barking but excluding the bay platform which this service uses. These sections were used only by occasional electric trains on other routes or by goods trains.

Electrification of the line was completed in 2018, but electric trains did not run at first as the delivery of the new Class 710 sets had been delayed. As the leases for the Class 172 came to an end in early 2019, London Overground temporarily shortened three of its Class 378s to run on the line to substitute the Class 172s until the long-delayed Class 710s entered service on 23 May 2019. All of the Class 378s were replaced by Class 710s by August 2019.

=== Interchanges ===
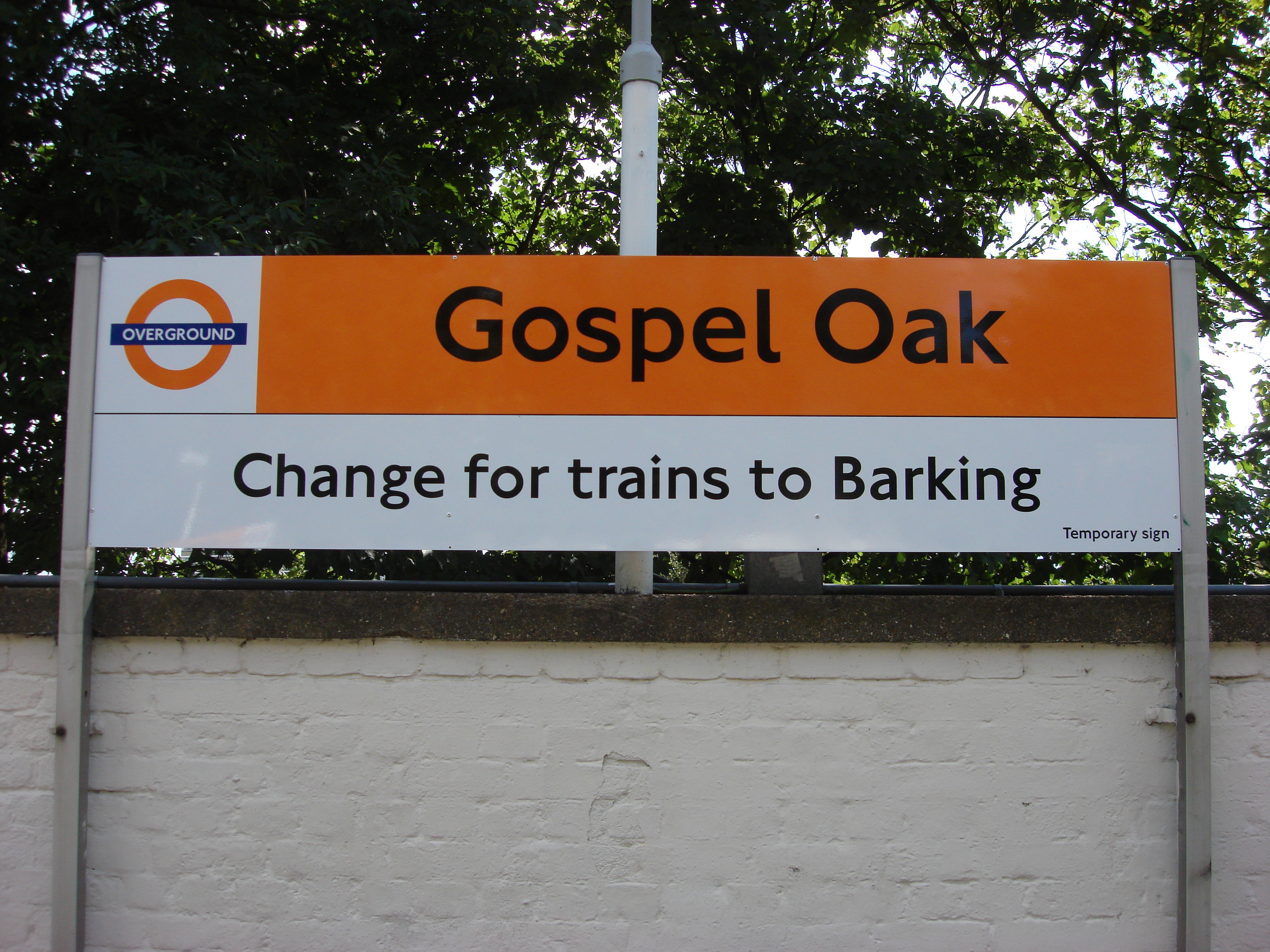
Sign advertising the interchange at Gospel Oak

The line has same-station interchanges with:

- the North London Line at Gospel Oak
- the Victoria line at Blackhorse Road
- the Hammersmith & City line, District line and c2c at Barking

There are out-of-station interchanges at:

- Harringay Green Lanes to Harringay on the Great Northern Route
- South Tottenham to Seven Sisters on the Seven Sisters Branch of the Lea Valley Lines and the London Underground Victoria line. (Signposting in the street does not indicate the pedestrian/cycle route between the two stations through Stonebridge Road.)
- Walthamstow Queens Road to Walthamstow Central on the Chingford branch of the Lea Valley Lines and the London Underground Victoria line. A footpath between the two stations, considerably shortening the foot journey between them, opened on 11 August 2014. While the footpath was first proposed in 1996, works had been delayed due to protracted legal battles over planning permission.
- Wanstead Park to Forest Gate on the Great Eastern Main Line
- Woodgrange Park to Manor Park on the Great Eastern Main Line

There are official TfL out-of-station-interchanges, whereby the passenger can continue an unbroken journey between:

- Upper Holloway and Archway on the Northern line
- Leytonstone High Road and Leytonstone on the Central line

Two other interchanges are walkable:

- Harringay Green Lanes and Manor House on the Piccadilly line
- Crouch Hill and Finsbury Park on the Piccadilly line and Victoria line

=== Vibrations ===
Residents in Walthamstow complained in 2012 that vibrations from goods traffic on the line were causing damage to their houses.

== Future ==
=== Castle Green/Renwick Road ===
As part of the extension to Barking Riverside, a station, called Castle Green, at Renwick Road on the London, Tilbury & Southend Railway was proposed. Although not built as part of the extension to Barking Riverside, the station site was safeguarded so that it can be built at a later stage.

=== Potential Abbey Wood extension ===
Following the plan to extend the line to Barking Riverside, there were also proposals to extend the line further across the river to Abbey Wood via Thamesmead, to allow for easier Orbital journeys in East London, and provide Thamesmead with a railway connection for the first time. This was outlined in the R25 orbital railway proposal in 2014, and the potential of a future extension was mentioned in the inspectors report of the Transport and Works Order authorising the extension to Barking Riverside.

However, in 2019 Transport for London and City Hall proposed an extension of the Docklands Light Railway (DLR) to serve Thamesmead instead of an extension of the Overground, as part of the proposed Thamesmead and Abbey Wood OAPF (Opportunity Area Planning Framework). A DLR extension was chosen due to lower connectivity benefits of an Overground extension, the low frequency (four trains per hour) of the Gospel Oak to Barking line, and — most significantly — a construction cost twice as much as the DLR, as the gradients required to cross the River Thames would require large scale tunnelling works when compared to the DLR. Despite recommending an extension of the DLR to Thamesmead, the consultation also noted that an extension of the Gospel Oak to Barking line could provide good orbital transport links in the long term.

=== Other proposed changes ===
Local residents and users of the line have proposed adding a station between Leytonstone High Road and Wanstead Park to serve the Cann Hall area. The Leyton and Wanstead branch of the Labour Party has expressed an interest in the proposal. The line's user group and Islington Borough Council have been pressing for the reopening of the station at Junction Road, as its proximity to Tufnell Park Underground station would allow interchange with the Northern line.
