= Highgate Road railway stations =

Former railway stations in London, England

Coordinates: 51°33′21″N 0°08′44″W

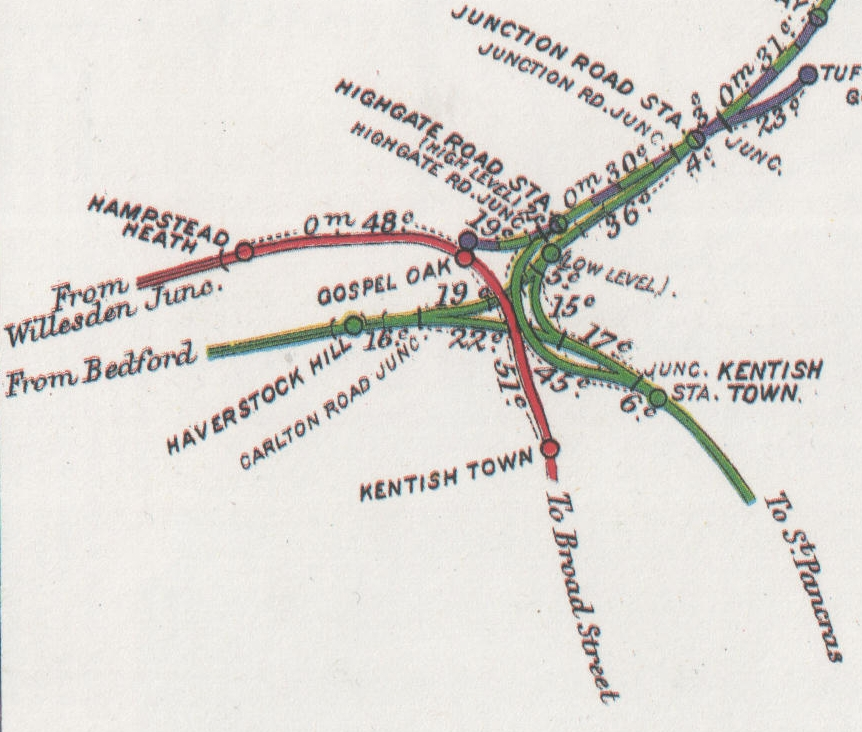
Local railway lines, 1914

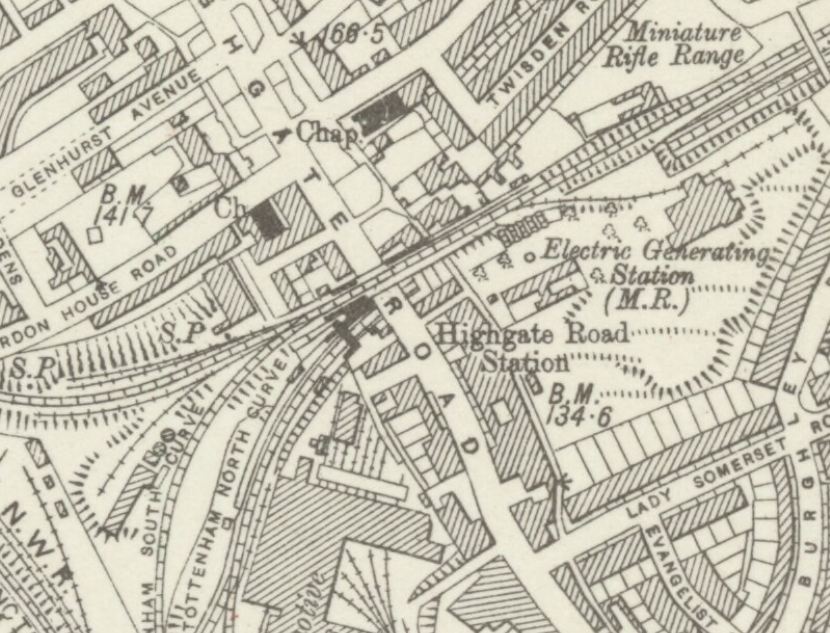
Ordnance Survey map, 1920

Highgate Road station

The Highgate Road railway stations were two adjacent but separate stations of the Tottenham and Hampstead Junction Railway in the north of Kentish Town, in St Pancras, London, now the London Borough of Camden. They were located on separate and parallel lines that joined east of the stations. The lines through both stations remain open.

== High level station ==
The High Level station was on a viaduct over Highgate Road on what is now the Gospel Oak to Barking line. It opened in 1868 and closed in 1915. At one time a link led to Kentish Town station on the up Midland Main Line (MML).

== Low level station ==
The Low Level station opened in 1900 and closed in 1918. It was located on the west side of Highgate Road in a cutting which passed under the Road and connected to the up MML and to the North London line heading east.

Preceding station	Disused railways	Following station
Gospel Oak; Terminus	High Level station (1868–1915); Tottenham and Hampstead Junction Railway	Junction Road
Kentish Town	High Level station (1868–1915); Tottenham and Hampstead Junction Railway	Junction Road
Kentish Town	Low Level station (1900–1918); Midland Railway	Junction Road
Haverstock Hill	Low Level station (1900–1918); Midland Railway	Junction Road
