= Annie Huggett =

English suffragette (1892–1995)

Annie Clara Huggett (1892–1995) was an English political activist in Barking, London. She was a suffragette, working to bring about women's suffrage in the United Kingdom and met with prominent suffragette Emmeline Pankhurst. Huggett was a long-term member of the Labour Party and received a lifetime achievement award from party leader John Smith in the early 1990s. She is remembered in the name of a women's centre in Dagenham and was cited in announcements of the renaming of the Gospel Oak to Barking line of the London Overground to the Suffragette line in 2024.

== Biography ==
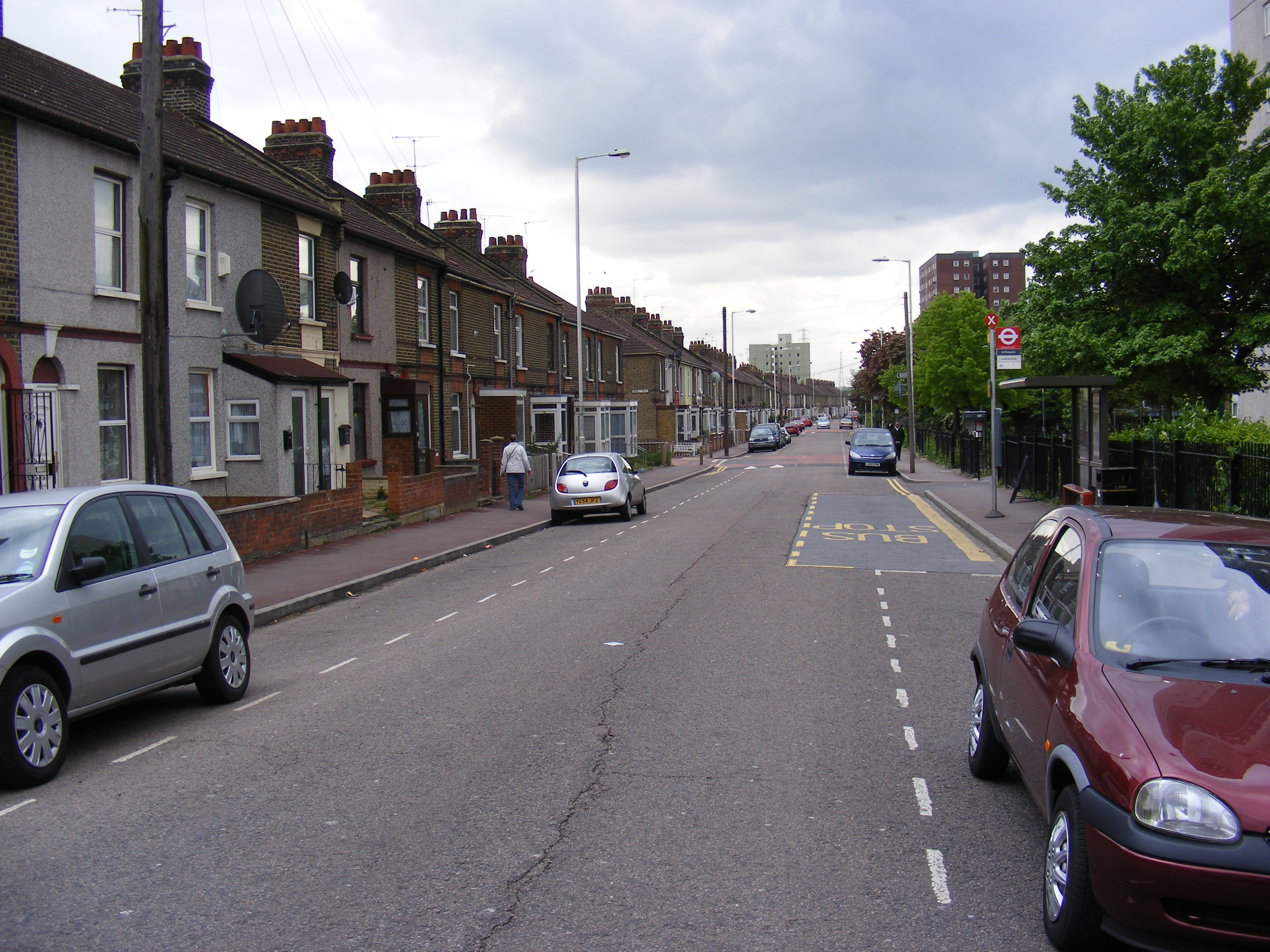
King Edward's Road, Barking, in 2009

Annie Clara French was born in Halstead, Essex, in 1892. Her family brought her to Barking in the east of London when they moved into one of the borough's first council houses on King Edward's Road in 1903. As a teenager Huggett became a supporter of the suffragettes, who were fighting a militant campaign for women's suffrage. From the age of 18 she organized suffragette campaign meetings at the Three Lamps public house on Barking Broadway. Members of the Pankhurst family, including leading suffragette and founder of the Women's Social and Political Union Emmeline Pankhurst, called at Huggett's house for tea. While she reportedly played an active part in the campaign Huggett escaped arrest. Although the WSPU ceased their operations in 1914, the larger and more peaceful women's suffrage movement continued the campaign, which was eventually successful with the Representation of the People Act 1918 granting the vote to most women and the Representation of the People (Equal Franchise) Act 1928 granting it on equal terms with men.

Huggett moved to a council house on Greatfields Road, Barking, in 1923. After women's suffrage had been achieved she focussed her political efforts on the labour movement, having joined the Women's Labour League (affiliated with the Labour Party) in 1911. Huggett became the longest card-carrying member of the Labour Party and was presented with a lifetime achievement award by John Smith (party leader 1992–1994).

Huggett's only son, Edward Frank Huggett, became a lance sergeant in the British Army and died in December 1942 during fighting in the North African theatre of the Second World War. Huggett visited the Medjez-El-Bab cemetery in Tunisia with her daughter in 1958 to lay flowers on his grave. Huggett was a republican and when she reached her 100th birthday, her family hid from her the traditional congratulatory telegram from Elizabeth II. Huggett became the oldest surviving suffragette. She died on 29 December 1995, at the age of 103, and was buried at Barking's Rippleside Cemetery, following a funeral at which the labour anthem "The Red Flag" was sung.

== Legacy ==
A bench was dedicated to Huggett in Greatfields Park in November 2015 and in September 2016 the women's centre in Dagenham Heathway was renamed the Huggett Centre in her honour.

In 2024 new names were announced for the London Overground lines, to come into official use in 2025. The Gospel Oak to Barking line, commonly known as the Goblin Line, became the Suffragette line. The names were developed from engagement with local communities and the name of this line was intended to mark the working-class movement in the area that supported women's suffrage. The London Mayor, Sadiq Khan remarked on Barking being Huggett's home and lying at one end of the line when he announced the renaming in February 2024.
