= Tufnell Park tube station =

London Underground station

Tufnell Park
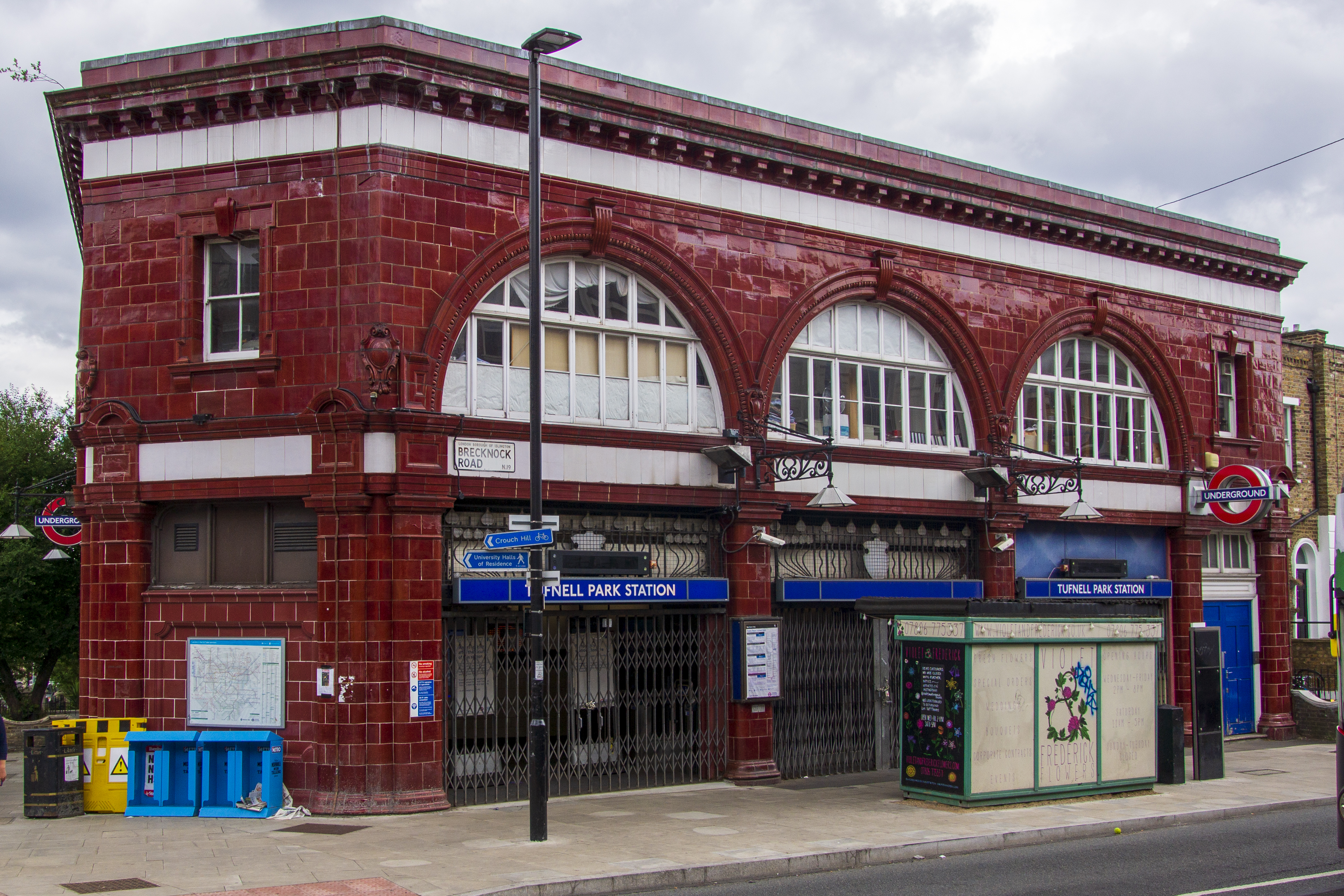
- Station building
- Interactive map of Tufnell Park

General information
- Location: Tufnell Park
- Local authority: London Borough of Islington
- Managed by: London Underground
- Number of platforms: 2
- Fare zone: 2

London Underground annual entry and exit
- 2020: ▼1.36 million
- 2021: ▲1.54 million
- 2022: ▲2.97 million
- 2023: ▲4.88 million
- 2024: ▲4.91 million

Railway companies
- Original company: Charing Cross, Euston and Hampstead Railway

Key dates
- 22 June 1907: Station opened

Other information
- External links: TfL station info page
- Coordinates: 51.5567°N 0.1381°W

Tufnell Park is a London Underground station in Islington, close to its boundary with Camden. It is located in the Tufnell Park neighbourhood. The station is on the High Barnet branch of the Northern line, between Archway and Kentish Town stations. It is in London fare zone 2.

== Station ==
The station has Passenger Operated Ticket Machines, however before there was a ticket office that was closed permanently. It has two lifts between the street and the platform level, rather than escalators. Upon exiting the lifts, passengers are required to use stairs to reach the trains. The southbound platform lies at a lower level than the northbound.

== History ==
The station was opened on 22 June 1907 by the Charing Cross, Euston & Hampstead Railway. The building was designed by architect Leslie Green and the exterior features glazed terracotta (faïence) tiling, supplied by the Leeds Fireclay Company. Although close to Junction Road railway station on the Tottenham & Hampstead Junction Railway, there was never a physical connection between the two stations.

The station was modernised in 2004 by Tube Lines. Major items of works were the communication systems, a complete retiling and new ceilings throughout. Ticket gates were installed some time later. The station also houses a large industrial ventilation fan as part of London Underground's Cooling the Tube project. The fan runs year round along with fans at other Northern line locations. The station was closed between 8 June 2015 and 4 March 2016 for the replacement of the lifts.

== Connections ==
Day and nighttime London Buses routes serve the station.

== See also ==
- Junction Road, London
- Junction Road railway station

Preceding station	London Underground	Following station
Archway towards High Barnet or Mill Hill East	Northern line High Barnet branch	Kentish Town towards Battersea Power Station, Morden or Kennington
