= Gospel Oak railway station =

London Overground station

Gospel Oak
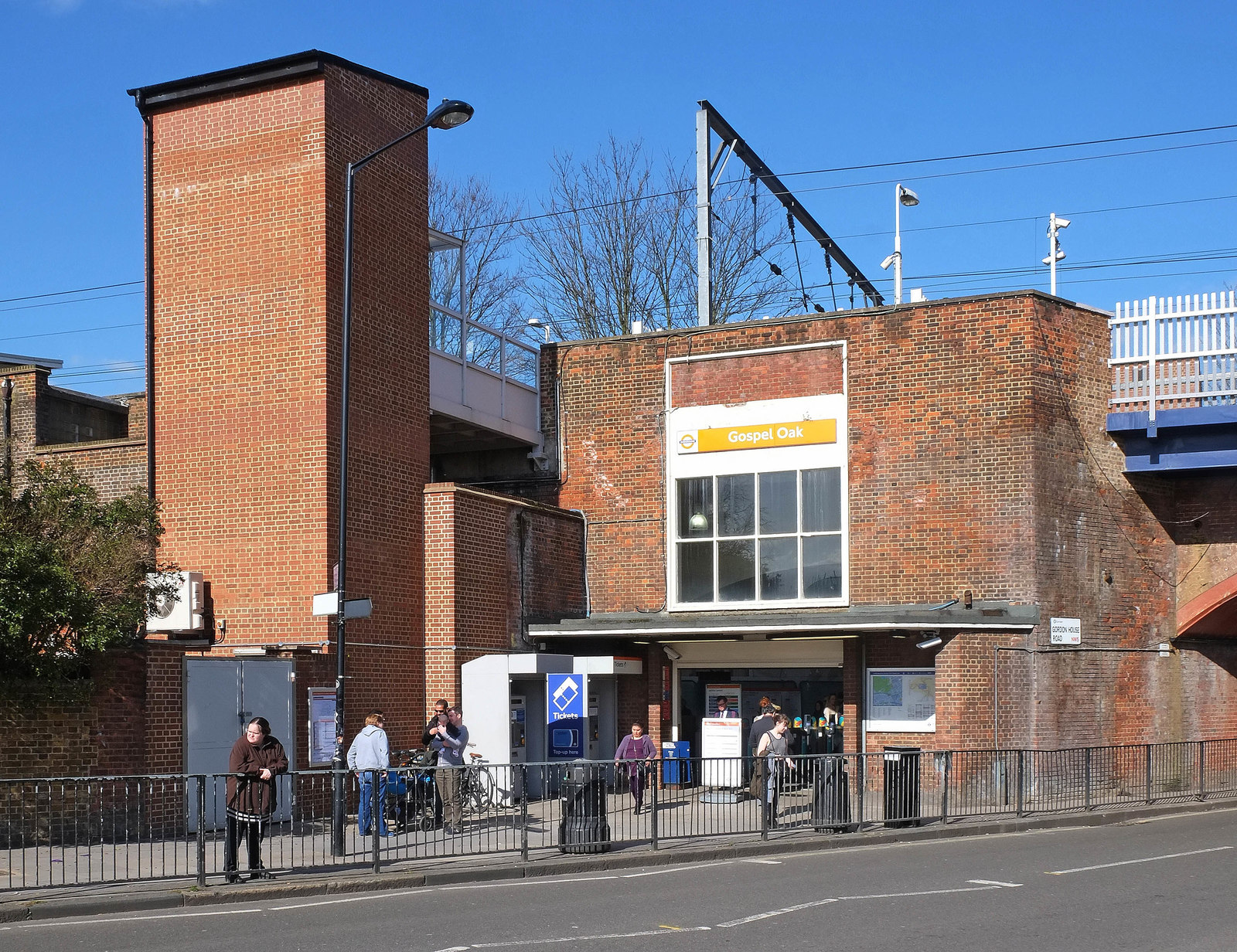
- The station entrance in 2016
- Interactive map of Gospel Oak

General information
- Location: Mansfield Road, Gospel Oak
- Local authority: London Borough of Camden
- Managed by: London Overground
- Owner: Network Rail
- Station code: GPO
- DfT category: D
- Number of platforms: 3
- Accessible: Yes
- Fare zone: 2

National Rail annual entry and exit
- 2020–21: ▼1.113 million
- Interchange: ▼0.810 million
- 2021–22: ▲2.006 million
- Interchange: ▲1.354 million
- 2022–23: ▲2.224 million
- Interchange: ▲1.738 million
- 2023–24: ▲2.564 million
- Interchange: ▲1.852 million
- 2024–25: ▲2.664 million
- Interchange: ▼1.749 million

Key dates
- 2 January 1860: Opened (NLL)
- 4 June 1888: Opened (GOBLIN)
- 1926: Closed (GOBLIN)
- 1981: Reopened (GOBLIN)

Other information
- External links: Departures; Facilities
- Coordinates: 51.5552°N 0.1514°W

Gospel Oak is a London Overground interchange station on Mansfield Road, in the London Borough of Camden. It is the western terminus of the Suffragette line to and from Barking Riverside, and is also situated on the Mildmay line between Clapham Junction/Richmond and Stratford. Passengers using Oyster cards are required to tap on interchange Oyster card readers when changing between the two lines. The station is in London fare zone 2.

== History ==
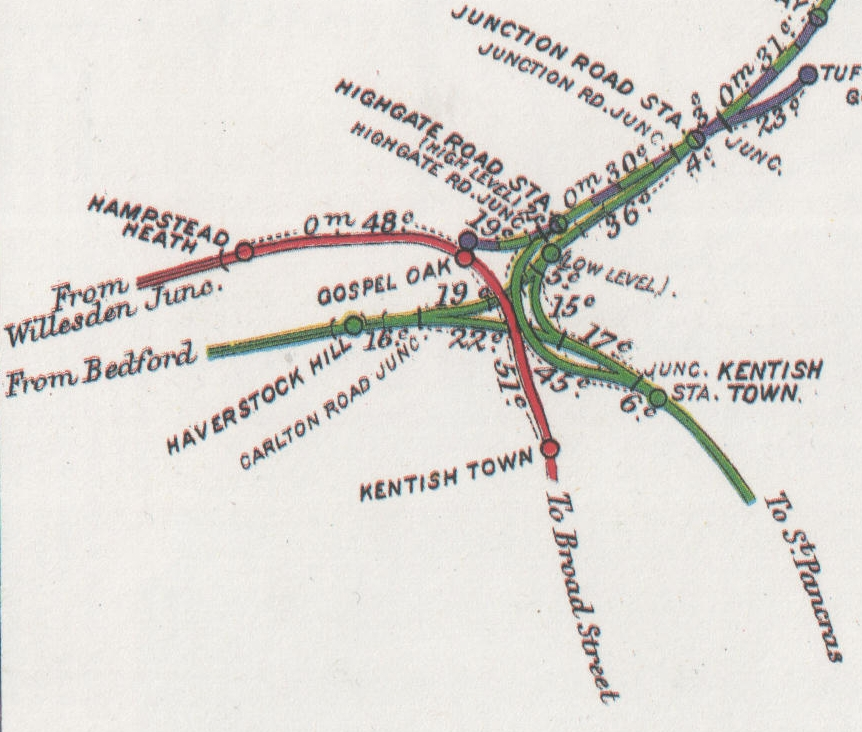
Local railway lines, 1914

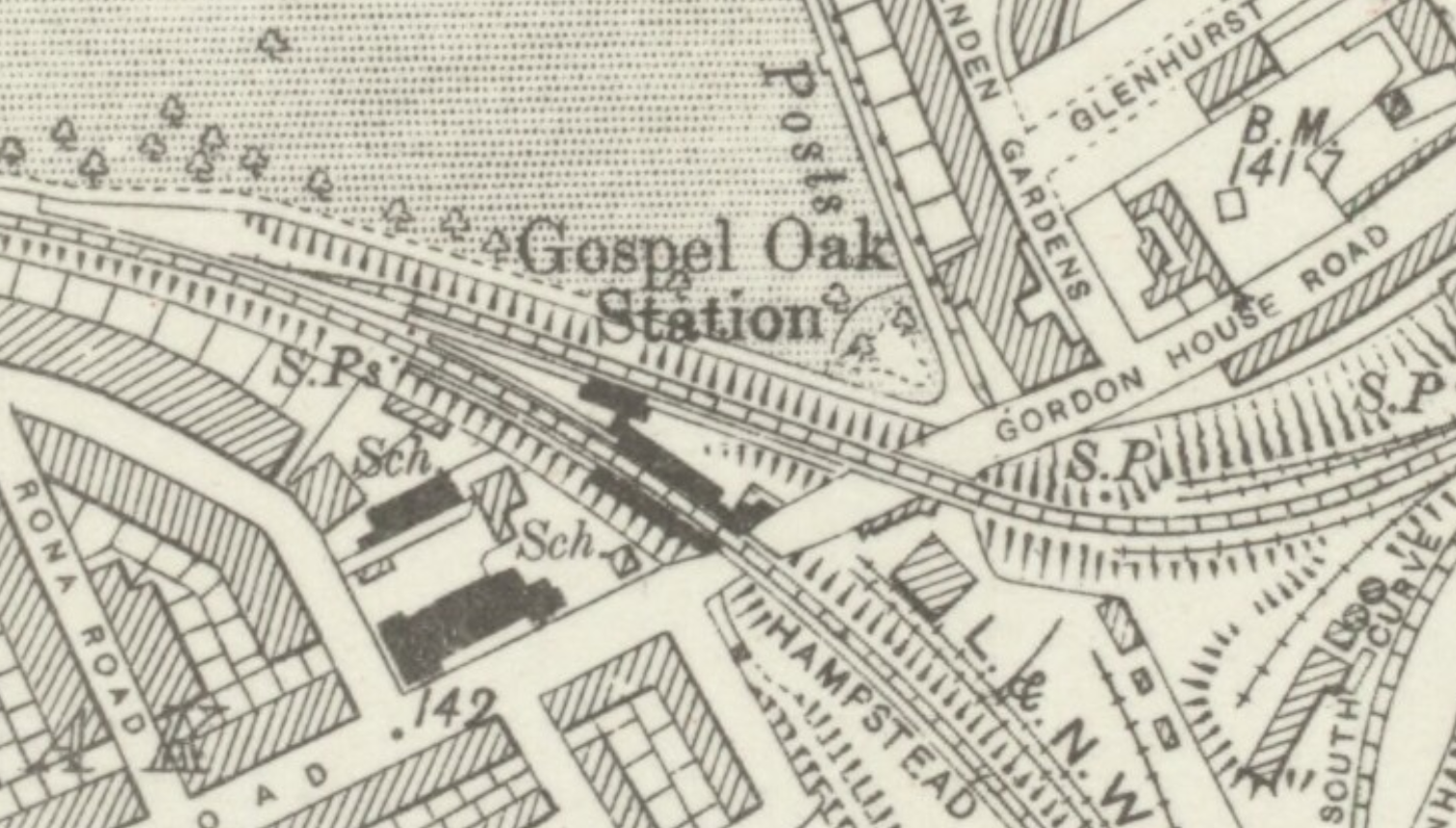
Ordnance Survey map, 1920

Gospel Oak station

The station opened in 1860 as Kentish Town on the Hampstead Junction Railway from Camden Road to Old Oak Common Junction south of Willesden Junction. It was renamed Gospel Oak in 1867 when a new station more appropriately named Kentish Town was opened about a mile south on the same line (that station is now Kentish Town West). Due to financial constraints a planned connection from the Tottenham and Hampstead Junction Railway to Gospel Oak station was not added until 4 June 1888, some 20 years after that railway opened, and then without a link to the North London line due to other companies' opposition.

Preceding station	Disused railways	Following station
Terminus	Tottenham and Hampstead Junction Railway	Highgate Road

The station was rebuilt by the London Midland Region of British Railways in 1954.

From 1926 to 1981, the station was not a passenger interchange: passenger trains left the Barking line at Tufnell Park and descended the gradient to Kentish Town station. In 1981 that passenger service from Barking was diverted from Kentish Town to Gospel Oak with the terminal platform rebuilt on the north side of the existing station.

The North London Line through Gospel Oak was electrified on the fourth-rail 660 volt DC system in 1916 by the LNWR: in the 1970s that was changed to 750 volt DC third rail. In 1996, the line from Willesden through Gospel Oak to Camden was closed during conversion to 25 kv AC overhead.

To allow four-car trains to run on the London Overground network, the North London Line between this station and Stratford closed from February 2010 to 1 June 2010, for installing a new signalling system and for extending 30 platforms. Until May 2011, there was a reduced service with no services on Sundays while the upgrade work continued.

== Design ==
The platforms are high above street level with stairs and two lifts, one serving westbound trains, and one serving eastbound trains and the Suffragette line. The Mildmay line has two platforms and the Suffragette line has a short terminal platform north of which are two separate through freight tracks which join the NLL just west of the station. Oyster ticket barriers are in operation.

== Services ==
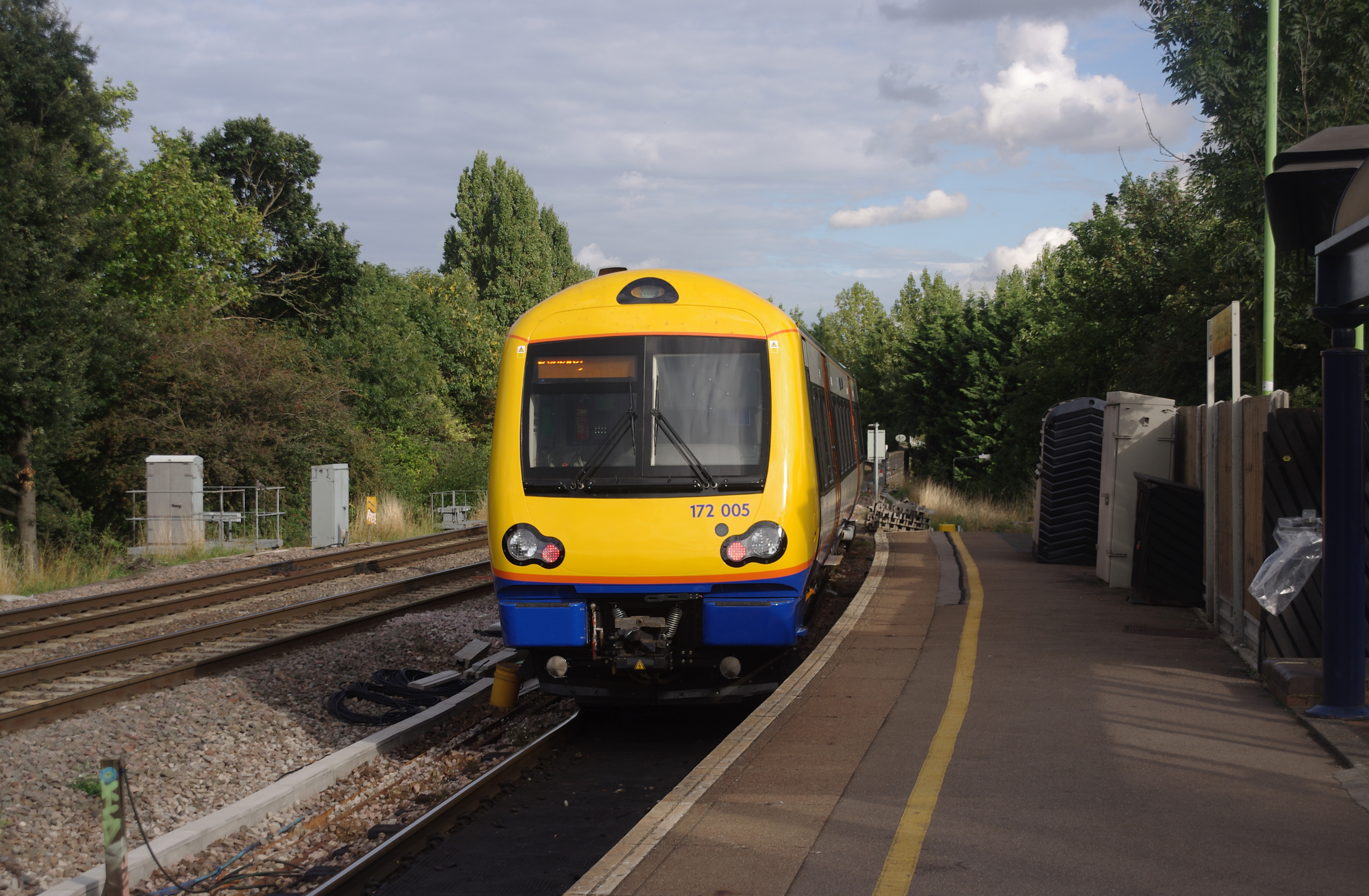
London Overground Turbostar unit 172005 departs from Gospel Oak with a service to Barking. Until 2018, the line was not fully electrified requiring diesel train operation.

All services at Gospel Oak are operated by London Overground using Class 378 and 710 EMUs.

The typical off-peak service in trains per hour is:

- 8 tph to Stratford via Camden Road
- 4 tph to Barking Riverside
- 4 tph to Richmond
- 4 tph to Clapham Junction

During the late evenings, the services to and from Clapham Junction do not operate (they terminate/start from Willsden Junction High Level), and the services to and from Barking Riverside are reduced to 3 tph.

Preceding station	London Overground	Following station
Hampstead Heath towards Clapham Junction or Richmond	Mildmay line North London line and West London line	Kentish Town West towards Stratford
Terminus	Suffragette line Gospel Oak to Barking line	Upper Holloway towards Barking Riverside

== Connections ==
London Buses route C11 serves the station.

== In arts and music ==
The two brick skew arch bridges by which the trains cross Gordon House Road are shown in the cover photograph of the 1997 Gospel Oak EP by Irish singer Sinéad O'Connor.
