= Barking station =

Interchange railway station in London

Barking
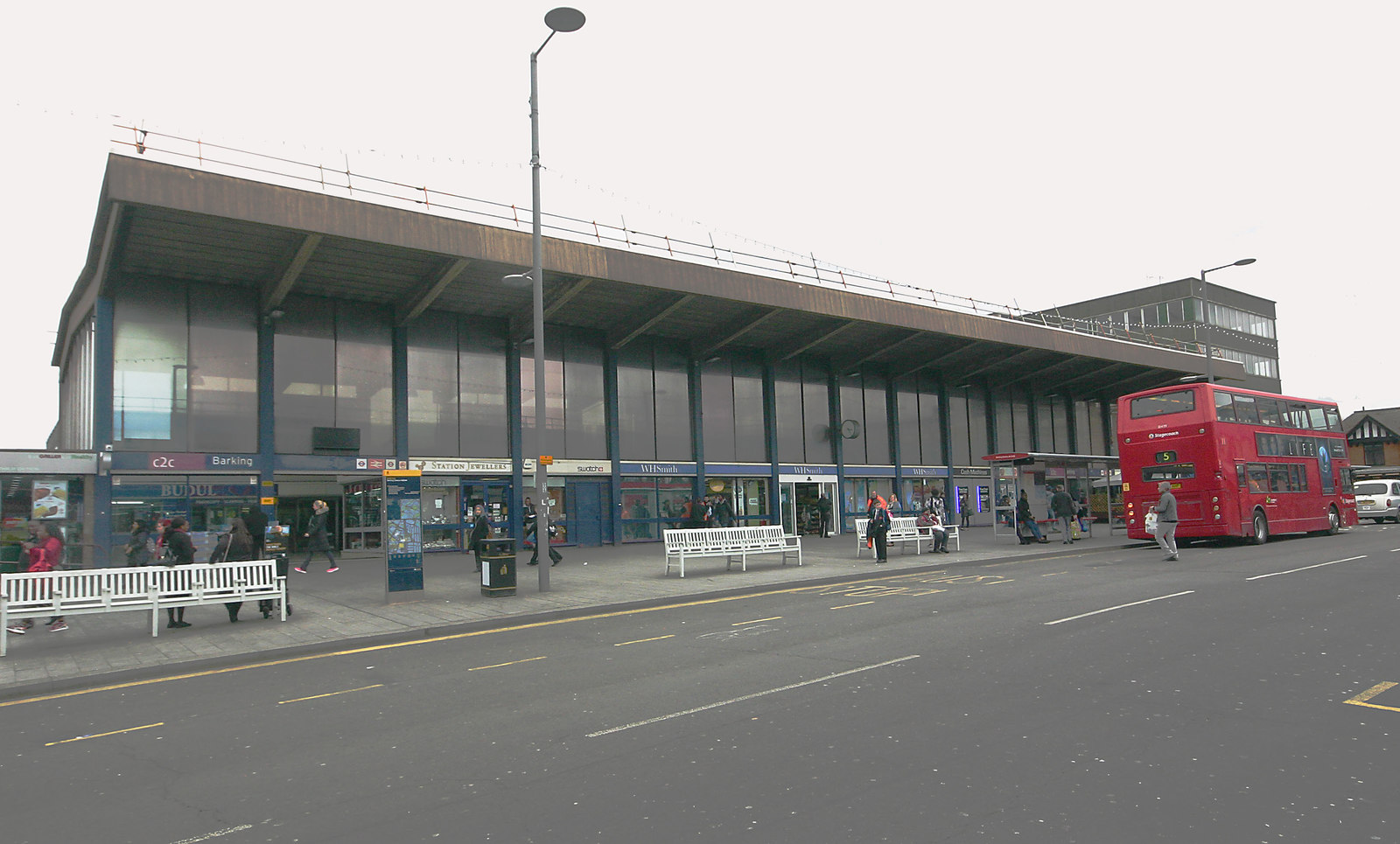
- Entrance to Station Parade

General information
- Location: Barking, Barking and Dagenham
- Coordinates: 51.5393°N 0.0817°E
- Owner: Network Rail
- Manager: c2c
- Platforms: 9
- Tracks: 8

Construction
- Accessible: Yes

Other information
- Station code: BKG
- Fare zone: 4
- Classification: Category B
- Website: Official website

History
- Opened: 13 April 1854
- Original company: London, Tilbury and Southend Railway
- Pre-grouping: Midland Railway
- Post-grouping: London, Midland and Scottish Railway

Key dates
- 2 June 1902: District line started
- 30 September 1905: District withdrawn
- 1 April 1908: District line restarted
- 30 March 1936: Metropolitan line started

Passengers

London Underground annual entry and exit
- 2021: ▼9.27 million
- 2022: ▲14.56 million
- 2023: ▲15.14 million
- 2024: ▲17.47 million
- 2025: ▼17.41 million

National Rail annual entry and exit
- 2021–22: ▲5.982 million
- Interchange: ▲1.500 million
- 2022–23: ▲12.730 million
- Interchange: ▼0.746 million
- 2023–24: ▲13.236 million
- Interchange: ▲1.122 million
- 2024–25: ▲13.359 million
- Interchange: ▲1.163 million
- 2025–26: ▲13.871 million
- Interchange: ▲1.344 million

Listed Building – Grade II
- Official name: Barking Station Booking Hall
- Designated: 24 November 1995
- Reference no.: 1242678
Location
- Location in Barking and Dagenham

Barking is an interchange station in the town of Barking in the London Borough of Barking and Dagenham, East London. It is on the London, Tilbury and Southend line, 7 miles 42 chains (12.1 km) down the line from Fenchurch Street in Central London. On the London Underground, it is on the District line and is the eastern terminus of the Hammersmith & City line. On the London Overground, it is on the Suffragette line. The station was opened by the London, Tilbury and Southend Railway on 13 April 1854 as the first station reached on the initial line from Forest Gate Junction. It became an interchange station in 1858 when a more direct line to Fenchurch Street was constructed. A further branch opened in 1885 and was completed in 1888, providing a faster route to Southend. It was connected to the Tottenham and Forest Gate Railway in 1894. It became the eastern terminus for electric District Railway trains in 1908, with electric service extended to Upminster in 1932. Metropolitan line service commenced in 1936. The large station building was rebuilt in 1961 and is now Grade II listed. It is in London fare zone 4.

== History ==
Barking was the first place reached by the London, Tilbury and Southend Railway (LTSR) on their line that started at Forest Gate Junction on the Eastern Counties Railway (ECR) and opened on 13 April 1854. The route to Fenchurch Street in London via the ECR was indirect and became congested. The LTSR built a more direct line between Barking and the London and Blackwall Extension Railway at Bow, with passenger service starting on 31 March 1858. The LTSR ceased to operate passenger services between Forest Gate Junction and Barking and this section was then used by ECR trains that terminated at Barking. Between 1885 and 1888 a new route authorised as the Barking and Pitsea Railway was constructed, that branched off to the east of Barking. It provided a more direct service from London to Southend, avoiding Tilbury.

The station was expanded in 1889 with the addition of two platforms and a new station building. In 1894, the line to Forest Gate Junction provided a connection to the Tottenham and Forest Gate Railway (TFGR), with through services to St Pancras and Moorgate via an indirect route. (Note: Initially, local services terminated at East Ham rather than Barking.) The Whitechapel and Bow Railway opened on 2 June 1902 and allowed through services of the District Railway (DR) to operate to Upminster. Service began at Barking on 2 June 1902. The DR was fourth-rail electrified over a second pair of tracks, and the service was cut back from Upminster to East Ham from 30 September 1905. On 1 April 1908, electric service was extended to Barking. Two platforms were initially provided and this was expanded to four in 1911. The LTSR and TFGR became part of the Midland Railway (MR) in 1912. (Note: The TFGR was an existing joint venture between the LTSR and the MR.) The MR was amalgamated into the London, Midland and Scottish Railway (LMS) on 1 January 1923.

Delayed by World War I, an additional pair of electrified tracks were extended by the London, Midland and Scottish Railway from Barking to Upminster allowing through DR service to resume in 1932. The DR was incorporated into London Transport in 1933, and became known as the District line. The eastern section of the District line was very overcrowded by the mid 1930s. In order to relieve this, the Metropolitan line service was extended to Barking. (Note: This was achieved by diverting Metropolitan line trains that had previously been routed onto the East London Line at Whitechapel.) Barking was served by a single daily Metropolitan line train from Hammersmith from 30 March 1936. This was expanded from 4 May 1936 with an eight trains per hour service between Barking and Hammersmith at peak times. The Hammersmith service was swapped for longer Uxbridge trains from 17 July 1939, at eight trains per hour at peak times. This service was suspended on 6 October 1941 with Hammersmith trains again running to Barking. After nationalisation of the railways in 1948, management of Barking station passed to British Railways.

The main station building was replaced and the platforms reconfigured, with works starting in 1959. In order to completely separate District line services from British Railways, two flyovers and a dive-under were constructed either side of the station. This allowed for cross-platform interchange between District line and Fenchurch Street services. Through trains from St Pancras were replaced by the Kentish Town to Barking service from 15 September 1958. The new booking hall was opened by the Queen in 1961. On 30 July 1990, the Hammersmith–Barking service of the Metropolitan line gained a separate identity as the Hammersmith & City line. The London, Tilbury and Southend line was run by a private operator from 26 May 1996, initially known as LTS Rail. From 13 December 2009, off-peak Hammersmith & City line service was extended from Whitechapel to Barking with a daily all-day service at East Ham. The London Overground service at the station was rebranded as the Suffragette line from November 2024. Private operation of the London, Tilbury and Southend line by Trenitalia c2c ceased on 20 July 2025, with the new publicly owned operator c2c taking over.

=== Incidents ===
During the Blitz of the Second World War, Barking station was damaged by bombs on 7 September 1940 and 12 September 1940.

On 23 October 2026, a freight train derailed to the west of the station between Woodgrange Park and Barking.

== Design ==
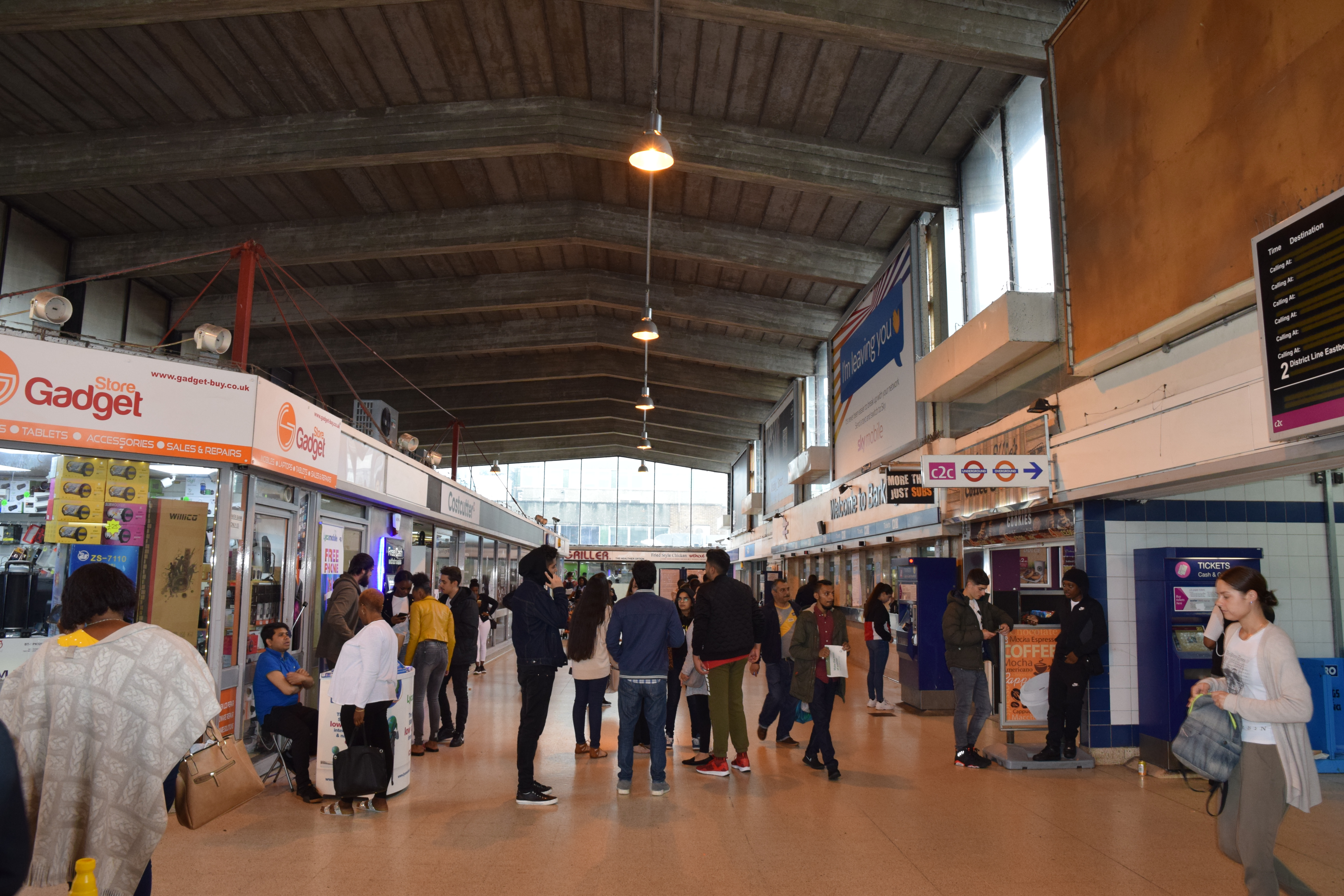
The interior of the 1961 booking hall in 2019, prior to refurbishment

The station consists of nine platforms facing eight tracks on an east–west alignment. Platform 1, the northernmost, is a terminal platform that can only be accessed from the Gospel Oak to Barking line to the west and is unused in normal service. It shares an island with a unnumbered platform face (internally referred to as 1a) used by eastbound London Underground trains continuing in service towards Upminster. (Note: The unnumbered platform was brought into use on 2 February 1964.) Platform 2, also served by the eastbound London Underground with doors opening on both sides of the train, shares an island with platform 4, the down line to Southend via Upminster. Platform 3, at the west end of the island, is a bay platform for London Underground service. Platform 5, the main up line to Fenchurch Street, shares an island with platform 6, for westbound London Underground service. Platform 7, served by the eastbound Suffragette line and the down line towards Grays via Rainham, shares the southernmost island with platform 8, for the westbound Suffragette line and the up line for Fenchurch Street and Liverpool Street.

The main station building has been replaced several times with no trace of earlier iterations. The 1854 building was a simple brick structure on the up platform, similar to that built at Grays. The 1889 building was still quite small and was architecturally similar to the still-existing station at West Horndon, including the "porch" entrance. The 1908 station building, built over the tracks, was a timber construction with brick frontage. Luggage lifts were provided to the platforms. This building originally consisted of a separate booking hall and parcels office, but these were later combined into a single space.

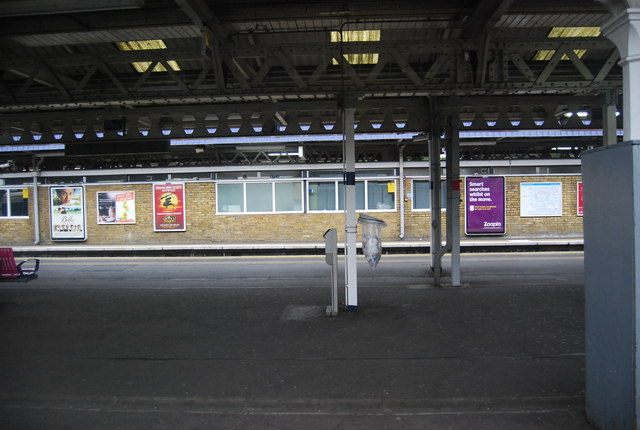
The 1961 platform buildings remain on platform 1, but were substantially removed from other platforms

The current booking hall, footbridge, staircases and platform buildings are from 1961 and were designed by a group of British Railways Eastern Region architects led by John Ward. The main structure is a precast concrete and glass building with a roof that projects forward to provide a street-facing canopy. Pevsner says "it is commensurately modern in outlook and unquestionably one of the best English stations of this date" and echoes the 1956 Eugenio Montuori design of Roma Termini. It has been a Grade II listed building since 24 November 1995. Although platforms were reconfigured in 1961, sections of platform canopy from 1908, minus the wooden valancing, were retained and mixed with new sections built in 1961. The 1908 platform buildings were replaced with new constructions in 1961. These were removed or substantially shortened in 1994, except for the 1/2 island which has the full length platform building from 1961. Plans to refurbish the 1961 booking hall and provide a second entrance to the footbridge were announced in 2019.

== Location ==
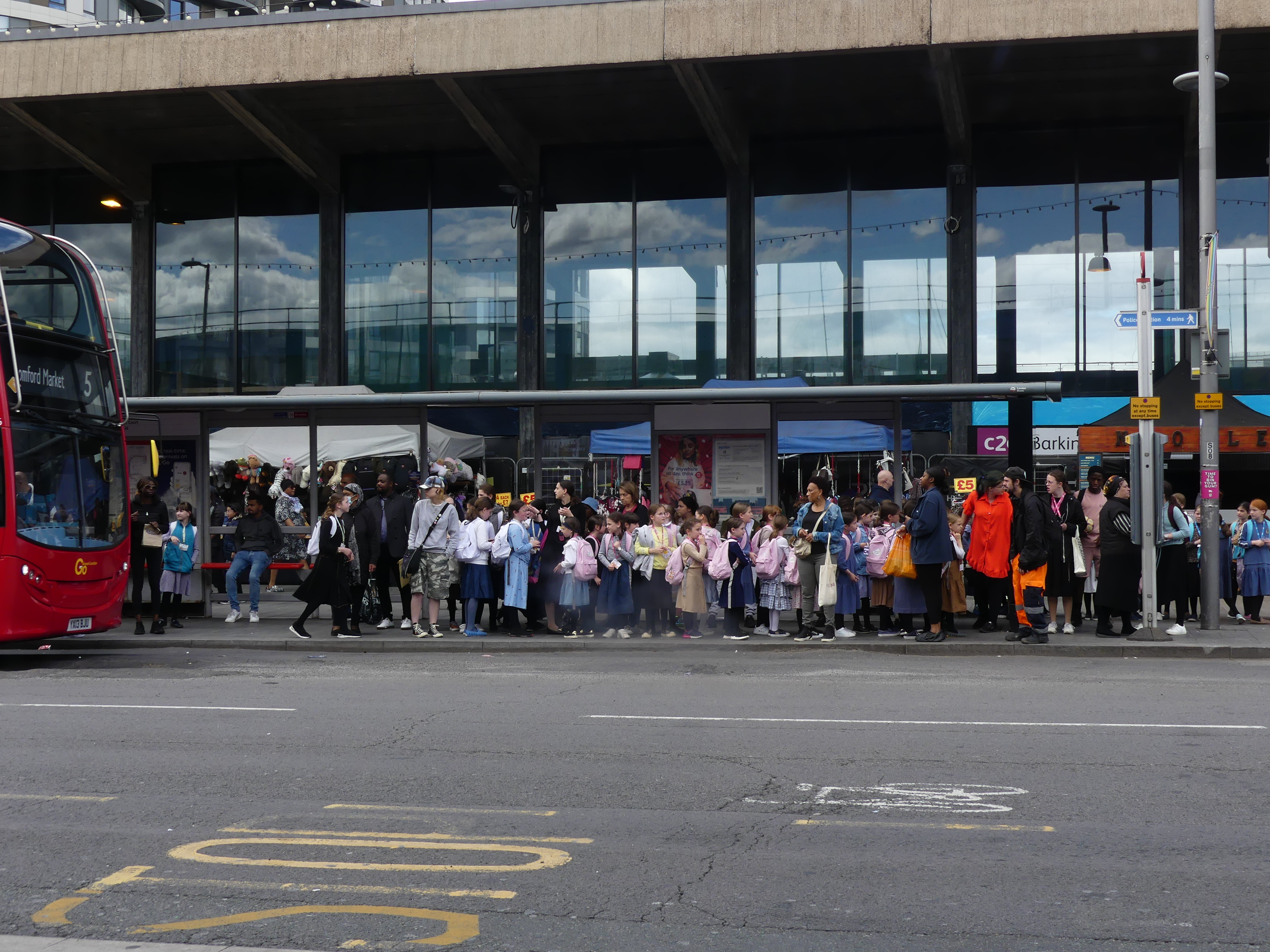
The frontage of the station is a busy bus interchange

The station is located on Station Parade, in the town of Barking in the London Borough of Barking and Dagenham. It is served by London Buses routes 5, 62, 169, 238, 287, 366, 368, 687, EL1, EL2, EL3, SL2 and night route N15. Upney is 1.47 km (0.91 miles) to the east of the station and East Ham is 2.29 km (1.42 miles) to the west. It is 12.34 km (7.67 miles) along the line from Tower Hill in Central London and 12.34 km (7.67 miles) from the eastern terminus at Upminster. The station is 7 miles 42 chains (12.1 km) down the line from Fenchurch Street.

== Services ==
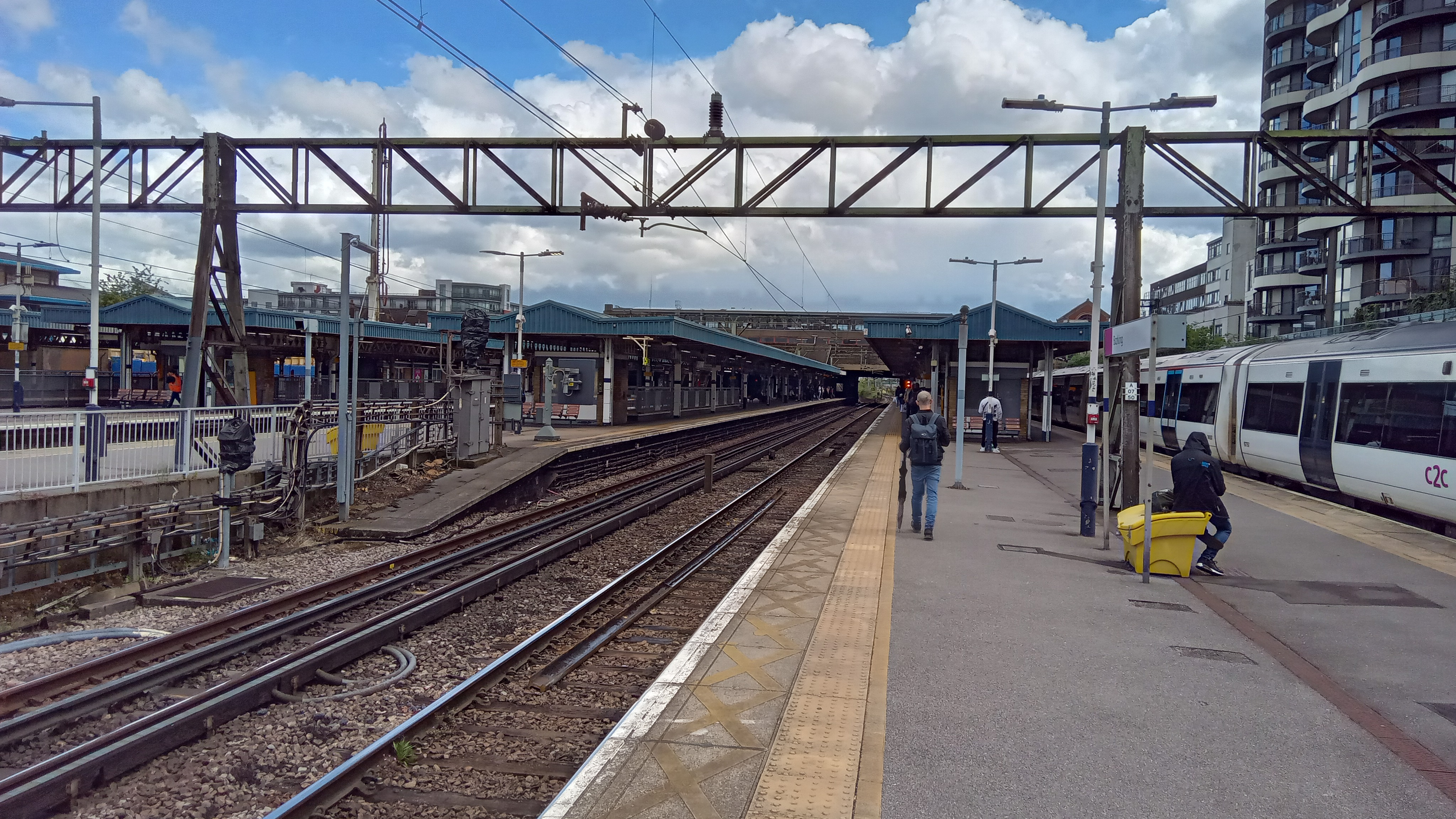
The four sets of island platforms viewed from the west

Barking station is managed by c2c. It is in London fare zone 4. The typical weekday off-peak c2c service from the station is eight trains per hour to Fenchurch Street, four to Shoeburyness via Basildon, (Note: Two trains per hour all stations and two semi-fast.) two to Southend Central via Ockendon and two to Grays via Rainham. The typical off-peak District line service from the station is fifteen trains per hour to Earl's Court, of which six continue to Ealing Broadway, six continue to Richmond and three continue to Wimbledon. There are six Hammersmith & City line trains an hour to Hammersmith at all times. The typical Suffragette line service is four trains per hour to Gospel Oak and four to Barking Riverside. With 17.41 million entries and exits in 2025, it ranked 30th busiest London Underground station.

== Notes ==
Preceding station	London Underground	Following station
East Ham towards Wimbledon, Richmond or Ealing Broadway	District line	Upney towards Upminster
East Ham towards Hammersmith	Hammersmith & City line	Terminus
Preceding station	London Overground	Following station
Woodgrange Park towards Gospel Oak	Suffragette line Gospel Oak to Barking line	Barking Riverside Terminus
Preceding station	National Rail	Following station
West Ham	c2c London, Tilbury and Southend line	Upminster
West Ham	c2c London, Tilbury and Southend line	Dagenham Dock
Stratford	c2c Liverpool Street–Barking (limited services)	Upminster
