= Wood Green railway station =

Wood Green railway station may refer to:

- Alexandra Palace railway station, formerly Wood Green railway station and Wood Green (Alexandra Park) railway station, Wood Green, north London
- Wood Green (Old Bescot) railway station, a former railway station near Wednesbury and Walsall
- Noel Park and Wood Green railway station, a former railway station in Wood Green north London
- Wood Green tube station, an underground railway station in Wood Green north London
