= Seven Sisters station =

London Underground and London Overground station

Seven Sisters
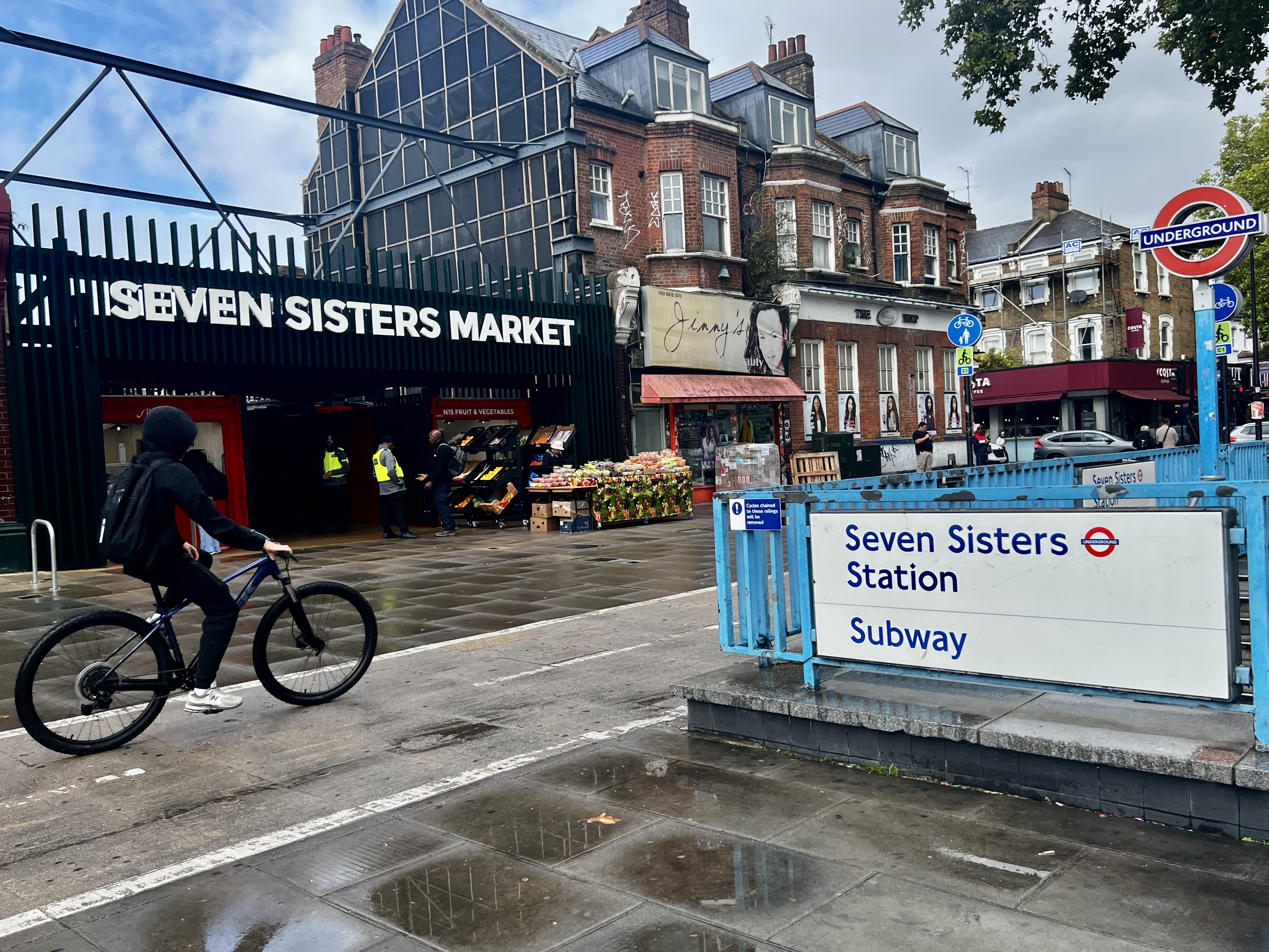
- One of the London Underground subway entrances to Seven Sisters station
- Interactive map of Seven Sisters

General information
- Location: Seven Sisters
- Local authority: London Borough of Haringey
- Managed by: London Underground; London Overground
- Station code: SVS
- DfT category: D
- Number of platforms: 5
- Fare zone: 3
- OSI: South Tottenham

London Underground annual entry and exit
- 2020: ▼10.31 million
- 2021: ▼7.36 million
- 2022: ▲16.72 million
- 2023: ▼12.17 million
- 2024: ▲12.71 million

National Rail annual entry and exit
- 2020–21: ▼2.359 million
- Interchange: ▼5,130
- 2021–22: ▲5.400 million
- Interchange: ▲9,293
- 2022–23: ▲6.113 million
- Interchange: ▼2,009
- 2023–24: ▲7.563 million
- Interchange: ▼32
- 2024–25: ▲8.394 million
- Interchange: ▼17

Key dates
- 22 July 1872: Opened (GER)
- 1 January 1878: Opened (Palace Gates Line)
- 7 January 1963: Closed (Palace Gates Line)
- 1 September 1968: Opened (Victoria line)

Other information
- External links: TfL station info page; Departures; Facilities
- Coordinates: 51.5822°N 0.0753°W

Seven Sisters is an interchange station in the Seven Sisters area of the London Borough of Haringey, north London. It is on the Victoria line of the London Underground and the Weaver line of the London Overground. The station is 350 metres (1,150 ft) walk away from South Tottenham station on the Suffragette line of the Overground, forming an official out-of-station interchange.

The station is in London fare zone 3 and has two entrances/exits: one on Tottenham High Road, and the other on Seven Sisters Road. It is the closest tube station to the Tottenham Hotspur Stadium. On the Victoria line, the station is between Finsbury Park and Tottenham Hale stations. On the Weaver line, it is between Stamford Hill and Bruce Grove stations.

== History ==
The station was constructed by the Great Eastern Railway (GER) on its Stoke Newington & Edmonton Railway line and opened on 22 July 1872. On 1 January 1878, the GER opened a branch line, the Palace Gates Line, from Seven Sisters station to Noel Park and later that year to Palace Gates (Wood Green) station.

The Palace Gates Line was closed by British Railways in 1963 for passengers and 1964 for freight, with the branch line track and platforms at Seven Sisters later removed. The single track curve to South Tottenham used by these trains en route to Tottenham Hale, Stratford and North Woolwich remained open however, and over the years has been used by a "Parliamentary" service between Liverpool Street and Enfield Town to avoid the need to institute closure proceedings for that curve, as well as the one linking South Tottenham with the West Anglia Main Line at Tottenham South Junction and even the Coppermill Junction to Stratford line for some years prior to its reopening to regular passenger trains in 2005. In the spring 2025 timetable, two trains (the 23:42 Enfield Town to Liverpool Street on Mondays to Thursdays and the 05:30 Liverpool Street to Enfield Town on Saturdays) both use this route and stop at the station.

On 24 July 1967, planning permission was granted to convert the station for London Underground use. The first section of the Victoria line opened on 1 September 1968, serving Seven Sisters, although a shared entrance and interchange facilities with the surface station were not opened until December 1968. The original GER entrance to the station was situated in West Green Road at the north end of the surface station, but the new combined entrance was opened in Seven Sisters Road at the south end on the site of a former wood merchants' yard, connecting to the west end of the Victoria line platforms. The original (1872) entrance was closed at that time. The National Rail platforms are not at street level. Platform 1 (towards London Liverpool Street) is accessed by twin staircases. Platform 2 (towards Enfield Town & Cheshunt) has a staircase and an "up" escalator.

A second entrance at the east end includes the main Victoria line ticket hall, and is accessed via subways on each side of High Road just north of the junction with Seven Sisters Road. There are three Victoria line platforms at Seven Sisters, with one platform reserved for services which terminate at the station to return to the depot or reverse back into central London, although a connection is available for trains to continue to Walthamstow Central.

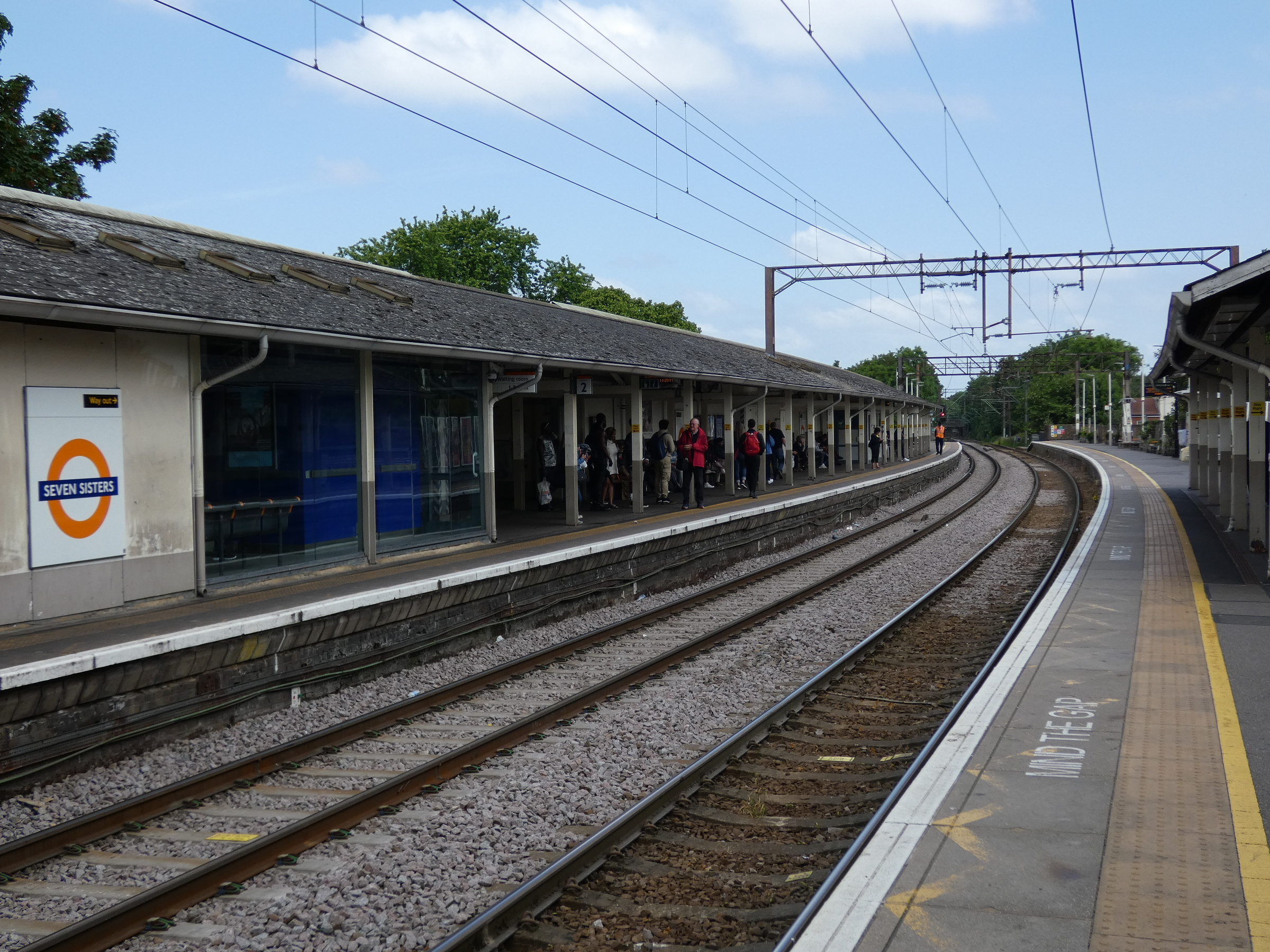
The two London Overground platforms at Seven Sisters Station

The distance between Seven Sisters and Finsbury Park stations on the Victoria line is 3.15 km (1.96 miles) making it the longest distance between adjacent stations in deep level tunnels on the London Underground network. During the planning phase of the Victoria line, thought was given to converting Manor House into a Victoria line station and diverting the Piccadilly line in new tunnels directly from Finsbury Park to Turnpike Lane via Harringay Green Lanes, but the idea was abandoned because of the inconvenience this would cause, as well as the cost.

On 31 May 2015, the station and most National Rail services that call here transferred from Abellio Greater Anglia to London Overground.

During summer 2015, there was no Victoria line service between Seven Sisters and Walthamstow Central to facilitate works outside of Walthamstow Central station, which would boost capacity along the line.

Most Greater Anglia Services (on the Liverpool Street to Hertford East and Bishops Stortford route) were withdrawn from this station at the May 2023 timetable change. However, some late evening and early morning Greater Anglia services still call.

== Services ==
=== Weaver line (London Overground) ===
Seven Sisters is located on the Weaver line of the London Overground, with all services operated using Class 710 EMUs.

The typical off-peak service in trains per hour is:

- 4 tph to London Liverpool Street
- 2 tph to Cheshunt
- 2 tph to Enfield Town

=== Victoria line (London Underground) ===
The typical off-peak London Underground service on the Victoria line in trains per hour is:

- 27 tph to Walthamstow Central
- 27 tph to Brixton via Victoria

Additional services call at the station during the peak hours.

| Preceding station | London Overground | Following station |
|---|---|---|
| Stamford Hill towards Liverpool Street | Weaver line Lea Valley lines | Bruce Grove towards Cheshunt or Enfield Town |
| Preceding station | London Underground | Following station |
| Finsbury Park towards Brixton | Victoria line | Tottenham Hale towards Walthamstow Central |
Disused railways
| South Tottenham Line and station open | Great Eastern Railway Palace Gates Line | West Green Line and station closed |
| Stamford Hill Line and station open | Great Eastern Railway Palace Gates Line | West Green Line and station closed |

== Future ==
In May 2013 it was announced that the station would be on the latest proposed route for Crossrail 2, with a double-ended underground station built linking South Tottenham and Seven Sisters stations.

== Connections ==
The station is served by a number of London Buses day and night time routes.

Seven Sisters is the nearest station on the London Underground network to Tottenham Hotspur Stadium and footfall is heavy on home match days.
