= Palace Gates line =

Defunct short railway branch line in north London

Route of Palace Gates Line highlighted on a 1900 map

The Palace Gates line was a short railway branch line in north London running from the main line at Seven Sisters station in Tottenham to Palace Gates (Wood Green) station in Wood Green.

== History ==
=== Great Eastern Railway (1878-1922) ===
The Great Eastern Railway (GER) opened Seven Sisters on 22 May 1872 on the line from Liverpool Street to Enfield Town. The station consisted of two platforms on an embankment. The area west of that line was being developed at the time and the GER felt that the draw of Alexandra Palace and the Alexandra Park Racecourse would generate additional leisure traffic for the branch. A branch had been proposed in 1869 but was withdrawn by the GER who were in financial difficulties at the time.

The Palace Gates line opened on 1 January 1878 with a temporary terminus at Green Lanes before being opened to Palace Gates (Wood Green) station on 7 October 1878. The line was opened in competition with the Great Northern Railway (GNR) line from King's Cross station. The line was built as a double track railway. All the stations had signal boxes and it was equipped with had mechanical lower quadrant semaphore signals and a block telegraph which remained little changed up to closure.

Green Lane station was renamed to Green Lanes & Noel Park in 1884 and was further renamed to Noel Park & Wood Green in 1902.

A two track engine shed was opened along with Palace Gates station. There was a turntable which could be used to turn the Y14/J15 class goods locomotives but apart from that all steam locomotives that operated the regular passenger services were tank engines. A wooden coaling stage was provided. As in common with many GER London area sheds, the engine shed did not have an allocated fleet of locomotives but locomotives from Stratford engine shed were rotated through as maintenance checks fell due.

In the early 1920s services were generally operated by GER Class Y65 2-4-2T engines which were later classified as Class F7 by the LNER.

=== London & North Eastern Railway (1923-1947) ===
The Railways Act 1921 amalgamated the GER, GNR and other railway companies into the London and North Eastern Railway (LNER) on 1 January 1923.

In the 1920s services were in the hands of GER Class L77 0-6-2T (LNE class N7) locomotives and the shuttle services were run by North Eastern RailwayNER Class O 0-4-4Ts which were classified as G5 by the LNER.

In 1930, a connection to Bounds Green Depot was established in order that carriage sets from the branch, could use a carriage washing plant in the depot. Through movements were possible to the Hertford Loop line but these were not straight forward.

With the nearby GNR built stations at Alexandra Palace (originally named Wood Green) and Hornsey providing a more direct route to central London, the catchment areas for the line's stations were always fairly small and the opening in 1932 of the Piccadilly line extension to Cockfosters with stations at Wood Green and Turnpike Lane, further eroded the line's passenger traffic.

In 1937 the announcement that Wood Green & Noel Park station was to be rebuilt was made. Although the bridge to the east was widened over Green Lane, the beginning of the war stopped the rebuilding scheme in its tracks. Thirty men under charge of a fitter were recorded working at the engine shed during this year as well.

World War II saw Liverpool Street services reduced to a shuttle service and a reduced peak only North Woolwich service. The branch was hit by a number of German Bombs during World War II. A fully signalled connection was made to Bowes Park on the GNR Hertford Loop Line, which ran just north of the site of the terminus station, opening on 1 July 1944.

=== British Railways (1948-1964) ===
In the early 1950s, the line was one of only two branches in the London area still worked by elderly F5, mainly, and F6 2-4-2Ts. The remaining examples of these were called into Stratford Works for withdrawal, in mid-1958. There then being no other suitable locomotives for the Palace Gates line, many of its trains were worked by J68 and J69 0-6-0Ts until sufficient N7 0-6-2Ts became available, following the electrification of suburban services from Liverpool Street station to Chingford and Hertford, in November, 1960. From 1 January 1962 Class 125 DMUs worked some services along with N7 and L1 steam locomotives making this service the last steam worked service on the former GER.

In 1950 the engine shed had an allocation of 9 locomotives but this closed at an unknown date in the late 1950s.

The Palace Gates line was closed to passengers on 7 January 1963. Green Lane sidings were closed 5 October 1964 and Noel Park on 7 December, Through freight services remained for some weeks before being withdrawn on 28 December 1964. In 1958 the a domestic solid fuel depot using the Hertford Loop connection was established. Once the traffic ceased in 1984, the depot at Bounds Green was extended to take over the former site.

== The route described ==
The branch started just south of Seven Sisters railway station. There were two curved platforms on the branch away from the mainline which was served by services to Enfield Town and Cheshunt stations. These platforms were effectively separate from the mainline and located on a viaduct. Access to the down mainline platform was via a bridge. Up trains arriving from Palace Gates could terminate at the up platform, detach and run round the carriages, then re-attach and depart back to Palace Gates.

Both the platforms and platform buildings were of timber construction.

On leaving Seven Sisters a downward gradient took the line into a shallow cutting running south of West Green Road. West Green station was located at the road junction of West Green and Philip Lanes. The station building was located at road level and the platforms accessed by stairs down from the station building. There was a small goods yard on the down side.

The next location on the branch was Green Lane sidings on the up side of the line which were accessed by a ground frame. The line then rose to the next station Noel Park and Green Lane which crossed Green Lane on a bridge after stopping at the station. After that the line continued on an embankment.

Finally the line ran into Palace Gates station two and a half miles from Seven Sisters and 7 miles 76 chains from Liverpool Street. Beyond the two-platformed station there was a two track engine shed, carriage sidings and a goods yard. The GNR station at Alexandra Palace railway station was located close by.

== Services ==
=== Passenger ===
Passenger services ran from Liverpool Street calling all stations from Seven Sisters to Palace Gates. Depending on the year some branch trains originated at Seven Sisters. During World War II the service operated as a shuttle between Seven Sisters and Palace Gates only until 1942 after which the branch was only served in the peak hours by North Woolwich trains. Shuttle services recommenced in Summer 1948 but were withdrawn on 15 September 1951.

As well as the Liverpool Street suburban traffic the service attracted rail staff based at Stratford and London dockers for the stations from Canning Town to North Woolwich. On 1 January 1880 a new service to Fenchurch Street via South Tottenham and Stratford. In August of the same year this was diverted to serve Blackwall station but this was withdrawn in February 1881. A new service to North Woolwich started on 1 June 1887 and this service was routed via via South Tottenham and Stratford Low-Level platforms.

Before the war the line that connected Palace Gates to the Bounds Green was used by occasional seaside excursion with the branch seeing larger main line locomotives. Horse box trains from Newmarket also ran in the 1930s for the Alexandra Palace racecourse..

During the war, the Liverpool Street service was cancelled and the branch was served by a shuttle service from Alexandra Place to Seven Sisters. The North Woolwich service was reduced to peak hours only and continued thus to the end of passenger services on 7 January 1963.

=== Goods ===
As mentioned above there were goods facilities at West Green Park, Green Lane Sidings (opened 1883) and Palace Gates. and Palace Gates. The services were worked by a pick up goods - commonly a GER Class Y14 0-6-0 (later known as the LNER J15 class). Coal for domestic use was the main traffic on the line and the engine shed was supplied with coal by a dedicated train from Temple Mills Yard. During and after the war the link to the Hertford Loop allowed through freights to work the branch generally bound for Temple Mills Yard.

== Remains ==
Tracks were removed and the stations demolished and the route of the line has been almost entirely covered by new construction including The Mall Wood Green (Shopping City). The only part of the line that remains is a short section of track within Bounds Green Depot where the line formerly connected to the Hertford Loop Line. A small section of the route can be seen from Avenue Road.

The latest (2015) proposed route for Crossrail 2 sees an option that would closely resemble the Palace Gates Line, running from Seven Sisters/South Tottenham railway station (double-ended station) through either Turnpike Lane and Alexandra Palace stations, or Wood Green Underground station, on its way to New Southgate railway station.
