= Bounds Green =

Coordinates: 51.6064°N 0.1246°W

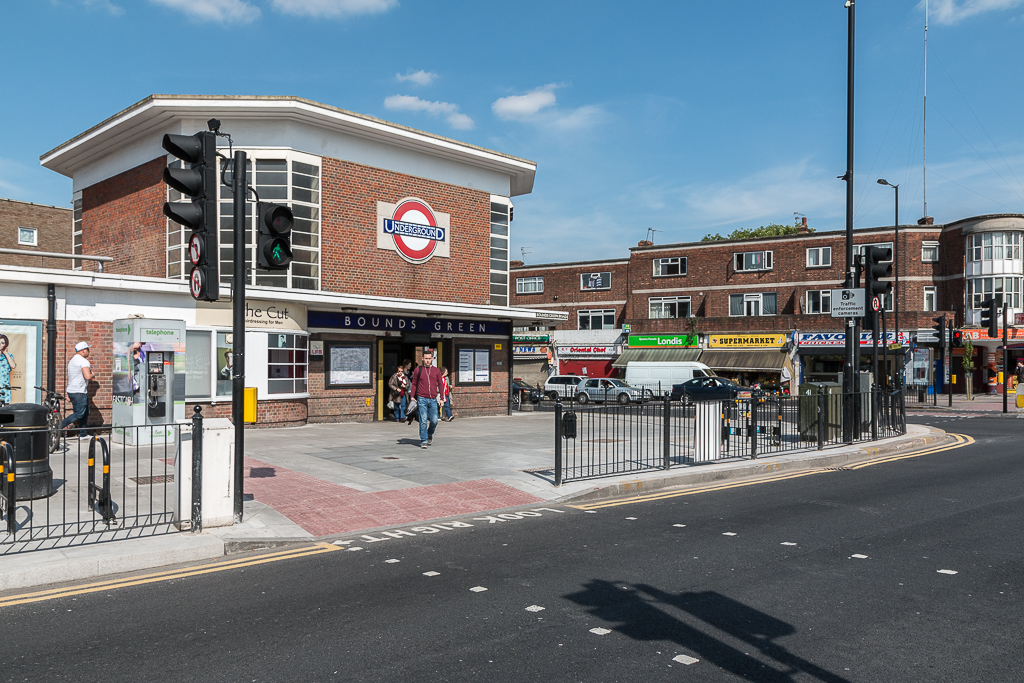

- Location within Greater London
- Population: 14,972 (ONS Mid-Year Estimates, 2017)
- OS grid reference: TQ298914
- London borough: Haringey
- Ceremonial county: Greater London
- Region: London
- Country: England
- Sovereign state: United Kingdom
- Post town: LONDON
- Postcode district: N11
- Dialling code: 020
- Police: Metropolitan
- Fire: London
- Ambulance: London
- UK Parliament: Southgate and Wood Green
- London Assembly: Enfield and Haringey

Bounds Green is a suburb to the north of Wood Green, in the London Borough of Haringey and London Borough of Enfield in north London. Parts of it are also known as Bowes Park, but most of Bowes Park lies in the London Borough of Enfield to the north-west.

Bounds Green was originally formed as a popular overnight stop-over for travellers, located on the then outskirts of London, just short of the tollgate at Turnpike Lane. Bounds Green Underground station on the Piccadilly line, opened in 1932, is in the area previously known as part of Bowes Park and which is also served by Bowes Park railway station. The original name of Bounds Green was associated with the former Bounds Green Farm near Cline Road, some 500 metres to the north-west of the Underground station.

The Green is still extant in part and is the common land either side of Bounds Green Road. The common of approximately two acres is bounded by Warwick Road, The Drive, Tewkesbury Terrace and Bounds Green Brook to the north of the A406 North Circular Road. Control of the common land passed to the London Borough of Haringey from the Municipal Borough of Wood Green in 1965. Other green areas of land include the Albert Road Recreation Ground and Golf Course Allotments.

== Demography ==
Bounds Green's overall population spread mirrors that seen in Haringey more widely, with just under half of residents aged 20–44 (44.3%), and a small proportion aged 65+ (9.5%). There is no major variation in age group composition across the ward.

Bounds Green has a larger proportion of residents whose ethnicity is White Other (30.5%), compared to the wider Haringey population (25.9%). While the proportion of White British residents in Bounds Green is similar to the proportion of residents of White Other ethnicity, this group is slightly under-represented in the ward (29.7% compared to 34.7% in Haringey).

Religion in Bounds Green mirrors Haringey more widely, with the largest proportion of residents (49%) identifying as Christian. This is a slightly larger proportion compared to Haringey (45%).

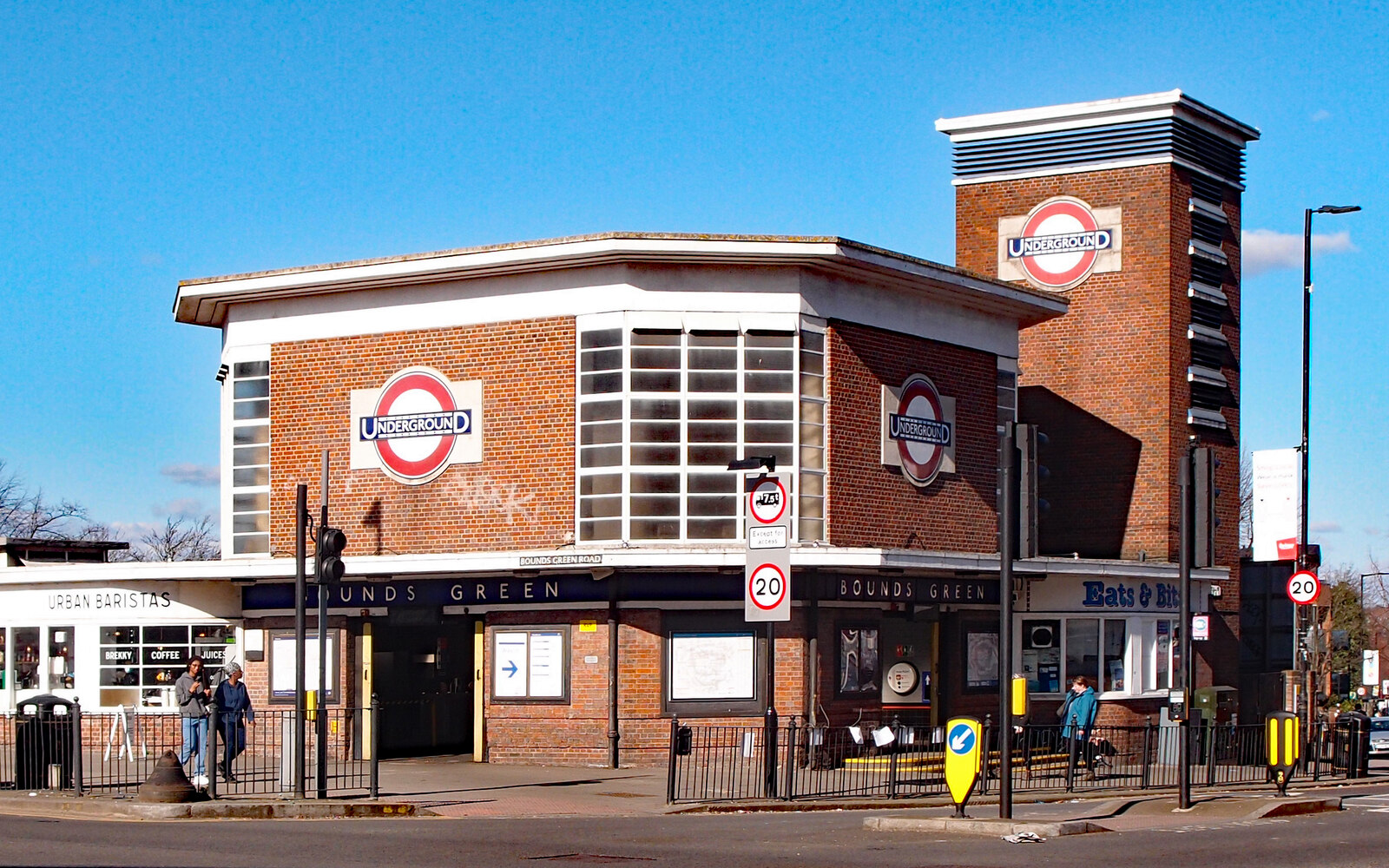
Bounds Green Underground station

== Transport links ==
Bounds Green has its own tube station on the Piccadilly line. Bowes Park mainline station, on the line into Kings Cross and Moorgate, is a short distance away. There are also a number of bus services connecting Bounds Green to the surrounding areas – most notably the 102, 299 and 184 buses. Bounds Green is bordered by the A406 North Circular Road to the north.

Bounds Green Traction Maintenance Depot services trains on the East Coast Main Line, which passes through the area.

== Politics ==
Bounds Green is part of the Southgate and Wood Green constituency for elections to the House of Commons of the United Kingdom.

Bounds Green is part of the Bounds Green ward for elections to Haringey London Borough Council.

== Notable people ==
Eminent surgeon Henry Cline (1750–1827) bought Bounds Green House in 1808, together with surrounding farmland. The house was located to the south of the present Cline Road. Cline was a surgeon at St Thomas' Hospital and later became President of the Royal College of Surgeons (1823).

== Nearest places ==
- Wood Green
- Bowes Park
- Muswell Hill
- Friern Barnet
- New Southgate
- Arnos Grove
- Alexandra Palace
