= Bowes Park =

Coordinates: 51.606375°N 0.118404°W

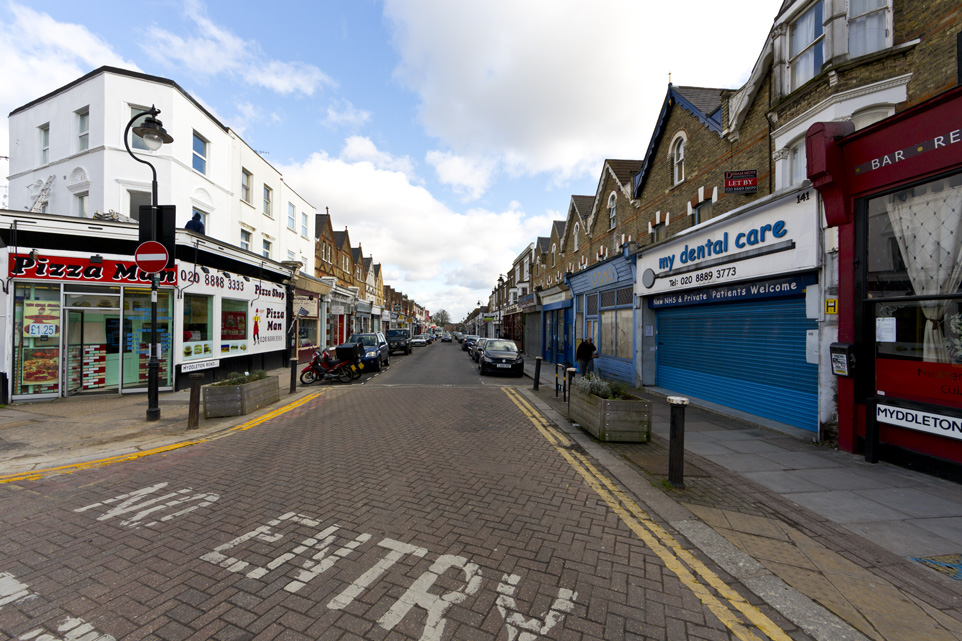
- Myddleton Road

- Location within Greater London
- OS grid reference: TQ307908
- London borough: Haringey; Enfield
- Ceremonial county: Greater London
- Region: London
- Country: England
- Sovereign state: United Kingdom
- Post town: LONDON
- Postcode district: N13, N22
- Dialling code: 020
- Police: Metropolitan
- Fire: London
- Ambulance: London
- London Assembly: Enfield and Haringey; Enfield and Haringey

Bowes Park (/boʊz/) is situated on the borders of Wood Green, Palmers Green and Bounds Green in London, England. The postcodes for Bowes Park are N11, N13 and N22. The border between the London boroughs of Enfield and Haringey goes through the area. Bowes Park "village" is defined as the triangle area between Bounds Green Road / Brownlow Rd (to the west), Green Lanes (to the east) down to Trinity Road (to the south) and the A406 (to the north)

The population for the Enfield ward at the 2011 Census was 14,051.

== History ==
The district developed in the 1880s and is named after an old manor called Bowes 1396, marked as Bowes Farm and Bowes (Manor) on the Ordnance Survey maps of 1822 and 1877, respectively. This is 'estate of a family called Bowes'; one John de Arcubus (Latin for 'of the bows or arches') occurs in a local document from 1274. John de Arcubus was one of many de Arcubi who lived around St Mary-le-Bow ("Sancta Maria de arcubus") church in the City of London.

== Community and grassroots campaigns ==
Bowes Park is a small community centred around Myddleton Road, which houses a number of shops. There has been a strong local grassroots campaign to gentrify the street. The local action group "We Love Myddleton Road" meet several times a year and work with the police and local council to encourage regeneration and business development in the area. English Heritage recently put forward funding for a number of shopfronts to be restored in a traditional timber framed style.

As of 2016, businesses and shops on Myddleton Road included a cafe and bar; an interior design and gifts shop; a Greek bakery; a Greek deli; an Italian deli; a local community space offering children's activities and yoga, amongst other things; a gym; a vintage interiors shop; a barber shop; and a piano shop and café.

The Bowes Park community also hosts the regular Myddleton Road market and the Bowes Park Summer Festival.

The road is named after Sir Hugh Myddelton, constructor of the New River, which passes through Bowes Park and under the road itself. A smaller shopping area is at the north end of Whittington Road.

== Transport ==
Bowes Park is served by mainline rail through Bowes Park station with trains to Moorgate via Finsbury Park and Highbury and Islington, London Underground through Bounds Green tube and bus services along Green Lanes to Wood Green tube station.

== Demography ==
The Bowes Park ward covers areas just south of the North Circular Road, but not the rail station. The 2011 census showed that the ward's population was 62% white (30% British, 29% Other, 3% Irish), and 8% was Indian.

== Places of worship ==
The Anglican St Michael at Bowes Church, and Trinity at Bowes Methodist Church, lie at the northern end of Palmerston Road.

Shaftesbury Hall is a rare example of a 19th-century tin tabernacle, which lies abandoned on the western side of Bowes Park station, on Herbert Road. Current part-owners The Samaritans have recently rebuilt the building for community use following an earlier proposal for demolition and replacement with a modern office block which was successfully opposed by local people.

== In popular culture ==
The shops in Myddleton Road featured in the first episode of the 1999 Channel 4 sitcom Spaced. Myddleton Road (outside a menswear shop) makes another brief appearance in a flashback sequence in episode 4 of the first series. The series Director Edgar Wright used to live in a Myddleton Road flat.

Some of the exterior sequences featuring Omid Djalili for the David Baddiel scripted film The Infidel were shot in Thorold Road.

Myddleton Road is included in some of the interior and exterior locations in the music video made by Free Seed Films for The Blockheads' "Express Yourself", the first single from their 2013 album 'Same Horse Different Jockey'. The album was recorded at the Cowshed Studio in Myddleton Road, Bowes Park.

== Notable people associated with Bowes Park ==
- Robert Ayton (1915–1985), a comics artist and illustrator who worked for the Eagle and Ladybird Books, was born in Bowes Park.
- Arthur C Clarke (16 December 1917 – 19 March 2008), the pioneering science fiction author and inventor, lived at 88 Nightingale Road, Bowes Park, from 1946 with his brother Fred Clarke and Fred's wife Dorothy.
- Natalie Evans, Baroness Evans of Bowes Park (born 29 November 1975) is a Conservative Party politician and member of the House of Lords.
- Donald Macadie, inventor of the electrical AVOmeter, lived at 190 Bowes Road at the corner of Moffat Road. For a time he rented Shaftesbury Hall, a pre-fabricated corrugated iron chapel or tin tabernacle on Herbert Road, as an assembly shop for his invention.
