= The Mall Wood Green =

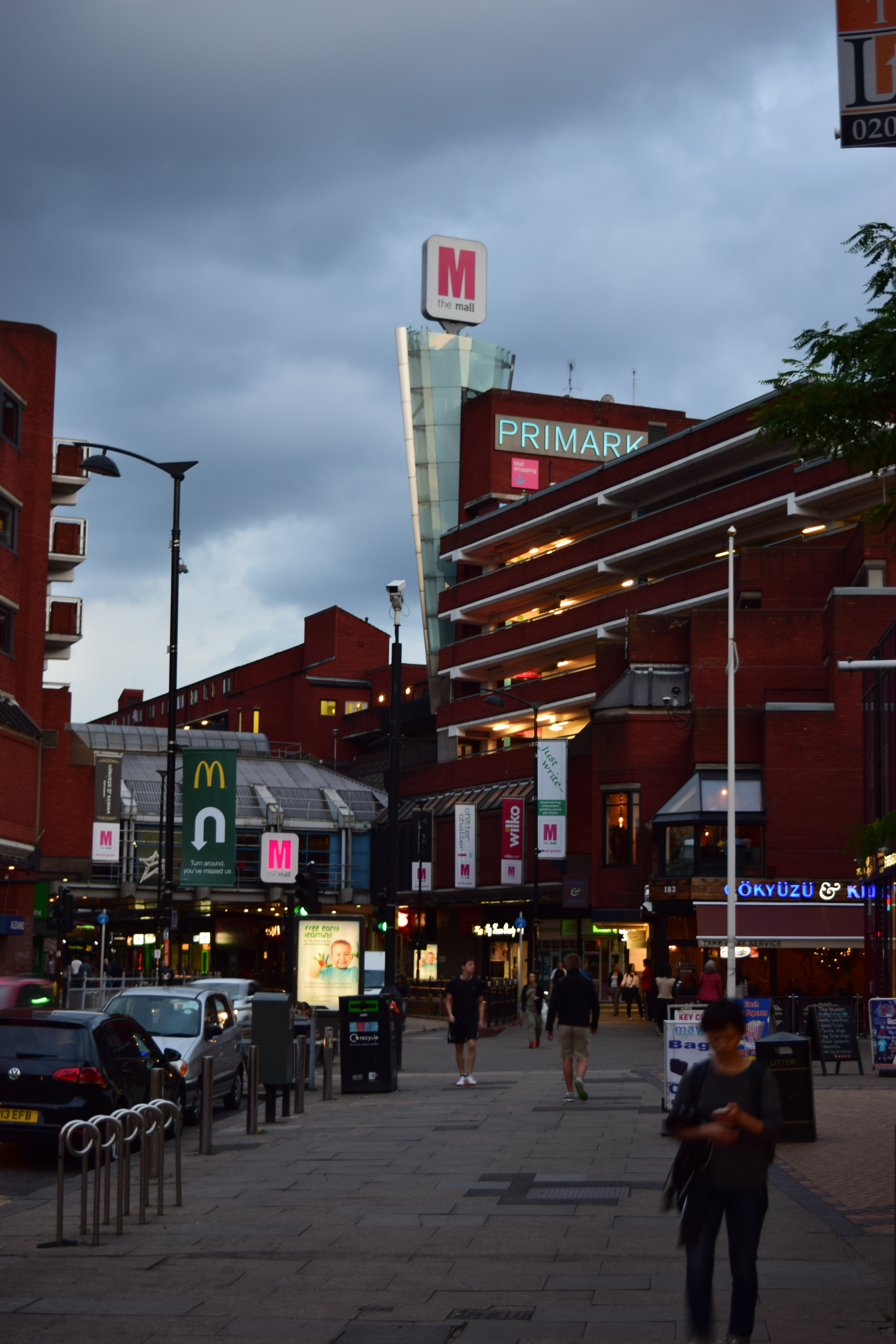
- The shopping centre at dusk
- Location: Wood Green, London
- Coordinates: 51.59451°N 0.10840°W
- Opened: 13 May 1981; 45 years ago
- Owner: The Mall Fund
- Num. of stores: 101 (+45 stalls)
- Num. of anchor tenants: 7
- Floor area: 617,000 sq ft (57,300 m^{2})
- Floors: 2
- Parking: 1500
- Website: www.themall.co.uk/wood-green/

The Mall Wood Green is a large shopping centre and residential complex in Wood Green, north London. It was originally known as Wood Green Shopping City.

As of 2006 The Mall had over 100 retail shops, seven of them anchor stores, 45 market stalls, and an average of 221,000 customers per week. The centre and the adjoining shops on Wood Green High Road constitute the commercial hub of the borough of Haringey and its surrounding areas.

== History ==
The centre was built in the 1970s as "Wood Green Shopping City", on the site of the former Noel Park and Wood Green railway station. Initially it included a number of unusual features, most notably a giant wooden climbing frame in the shape of a frog.

The centre was opened on 13 May 1981 by Queen Elizabeth II.

Unusually for a shopping centre, the A105 road (here called the High Road, though most of its length locally is called Green Lanes) runs directly through the complex, allowing many of the stores to have entrances directly onto the street. The two halves of the mall are linked by bridges at first and second floor level. The centre is six storeys high, but only the lower two floors are occupied by shops; the upper floors make up a housing complex known as "Sky City". In 2006, the badly decomposed body of Joyce Vincent, who had died over two years earlier, was found in a flat in the housing complex. A documentary on Vincent, Dreams of a Life, was made in 2011.

In the early 1990s recession, many of the centre's established shops closed and were replaced by pound shops and charity shops. The centre was targeted in a bomb attack in 1992 that injured civilians and police officers.

=== Redevelopment ===
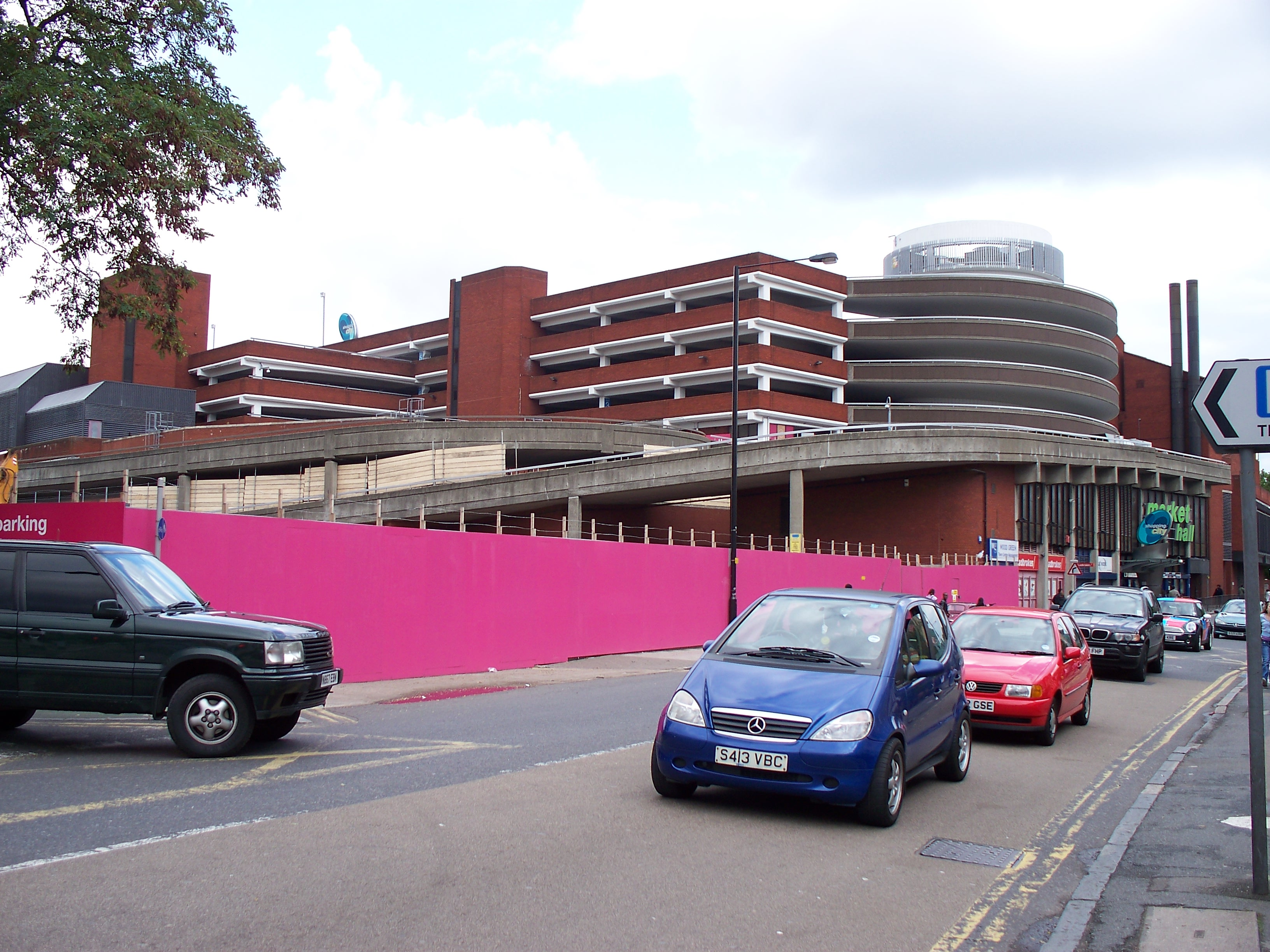
Construction work on the western extension, 2007

The centre was bought by current owners The Mall Fund in 2002 and renamed "The Mall Wood Green", although the "Shopping City" signage remained as late as 2012. The new owners carried out a £30 million rebuilding programme, altering the layout of the shops and adding a 12-screen cinema. The market hall was expanded, with a number of specialist retailers catering for the unusually diverse ethnic groups in the area. In 2007 the owners applied for consent to expand the centre further with a 3-storey extension on the site of an adjacent petrol station, which when complete will increase the mall size to 617,000 sq ft (57,300m^{2}) and the total number of retail units to 123, overtaking rival Brent Cross's 110 shops for the first time. Approval was given in May 2007, despite concerns raised about the possibility of flooding on the new site from the River Moselle; in June 2007 it was announced that the bulk of the extension would be occupied by a new Debenhams store. The proposal involved demolishing the existing Pearson's department store and extending the mall into space within and beyond this site. However, the Debenhams plan ultimately did not go ahead, and instead the bulk of the development site was taken up by a large Primark store.

The Mall is also the venue for a craft fair, held four times a year.

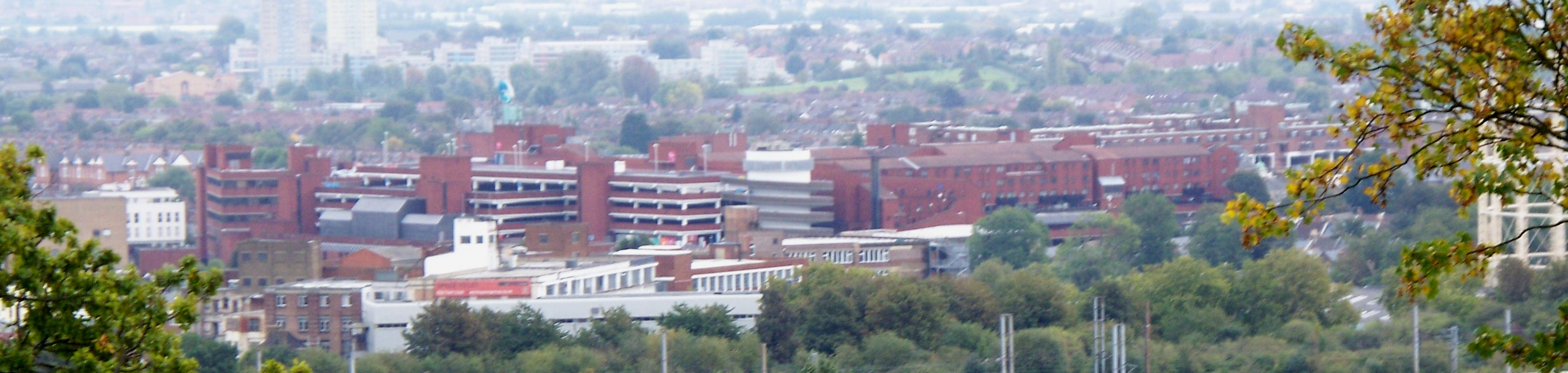
Aerial view of The Mall Wood Green and Sky City

== Crime ==
Unusually for a shopping centre, The Mall has its own dedicated team of police, part of Haringey BOCU police. The scheme, initially called "Operation Partnership" but later renamed the "Retail Protection Unit", was introduced in 1998.

The areas surrounding the Mall have traditionally been affected by high rates of street-drinking and its accompanying alcohol-related problems. In 2005 anti-drinking legislation was introduced, and the police were given powers to confiscate alcoholic drinks and to disperse crowds in the area around the centre.

The Mall made headlines in 2006 when a shoplifter attacked and repeatedly stabbed Designer Outlet store supervisor Rudy Takkou. Takkou narrowly survived, losing 4 litres of blood.

== Transport ==
Despite being situated on the site of a disused railway station, The Mall Wood Green is still very well served by public transport in comparison to London's other shopping centres. Wood Green and Turnpike Lane tube stations on the Piccadilly line are both near the mall, and due to Green Lanes, part of the A105, running through the centre of the development, it is possible to catch buses from directly outside the shops. Alexandra Palace railway station is a short distance to the west of the centre.

== Gallery ==
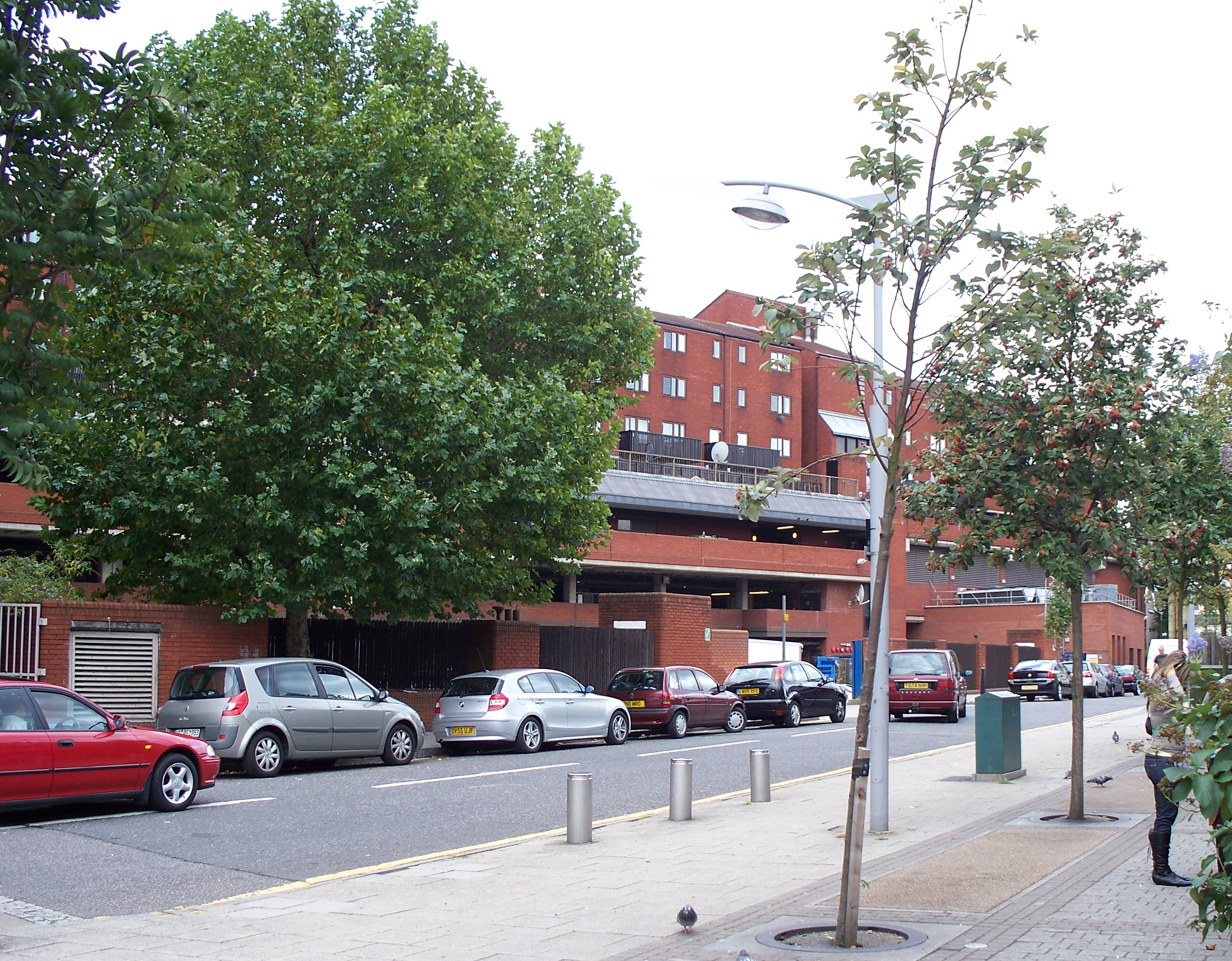
Sky City

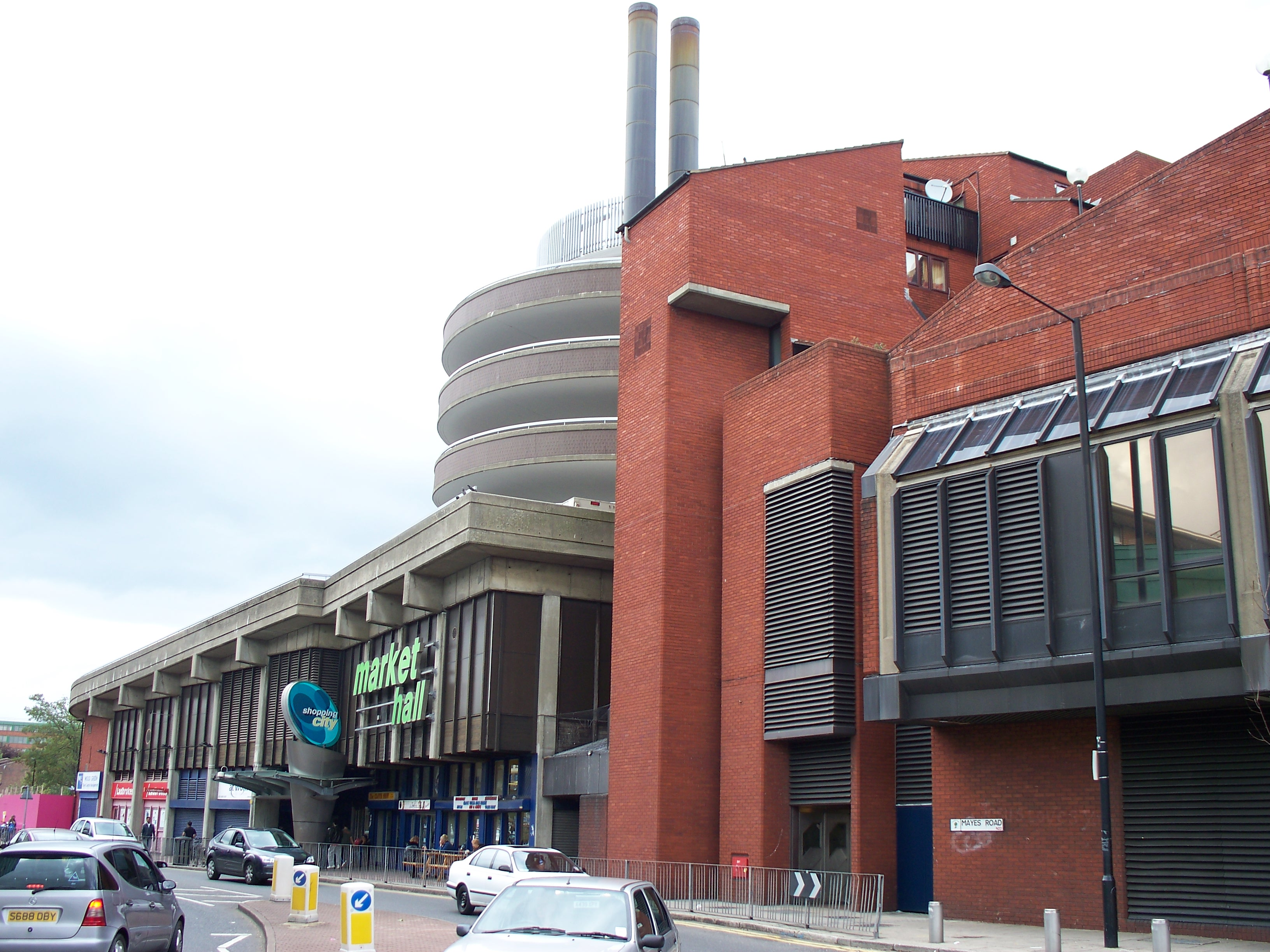
Western ("Market Hall") entrance to The Mall Wood Green

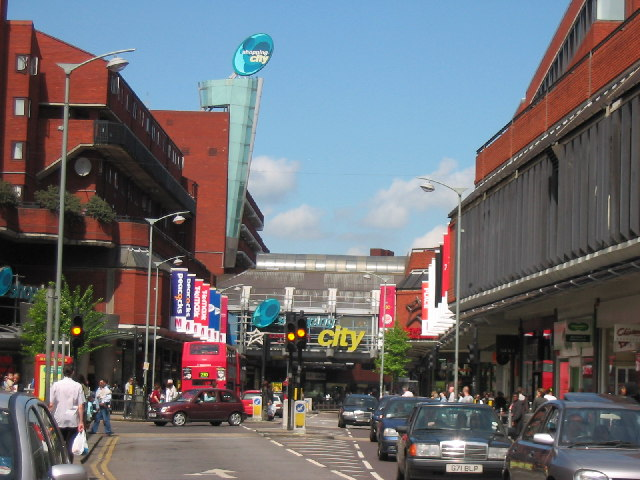
Shopping City in 2005
