= Bounds Green tube station =

London Underground station

Bounds Green
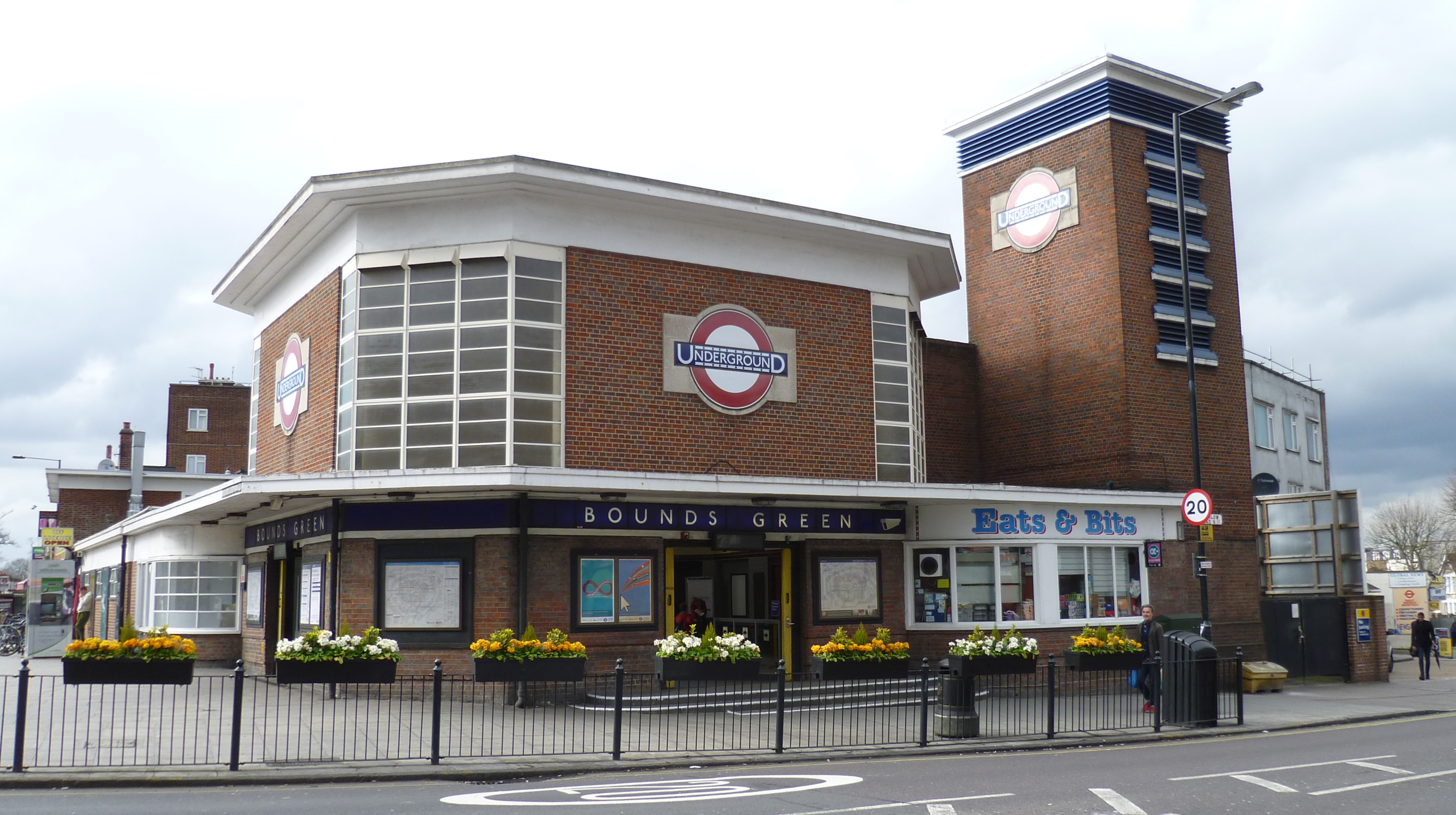
- Bounds Green station
- Interactive map of Bounds Green

General information
- Location: Bounds Green
- Local authority: London Borough of Haringey
- Managed by: London Underground
- Number of platforms: 2
- Fare zone: 3 and 4
- OSI: Bowes Park

London Underground annual entry and exit
- 2021: ▼2.51 million
- 2022: ▲4.15 million
- 2023: ▲4.27 million
- 2024: ▼4.13 million
- 2025: ▼3.96 million

Railway companies
- Original company: London Electric Railway

Key dates
- 19 September 1932: Station opened

Listed status
- Listing grade: II
- Entry number: 1393641
- Added to list: 19 January 2010; 16 years ago

Other information
- External links: TfL station info page
- Coordinates: 51.6069°N 0.1242°W

Bounds Green is a London Underground station. It is located at the junction of Bounds Green Road and Brownlow Road in Bounds Green in the London Borough of Haringey, north London. The station is on the Piccadilly line, between Wood Green and Arnos Grove stations. It is on the boundary between London fare zone 3 and 4.

== History ==
Like all stations on the Cockfosters extension, Bounds Green, which opened on 19 September 1932, set new aesthetic standards not previously seen on London's Underground. During the planning period of the extension to Cockfosters, alternate names for this station, "Wood Green North" and "Brownlow Road" were considered but rejected.

=== Second World War ===
The station was used as an air-raid shelter and people slept on the stairs between the escalators here as well as on the platforms. On the night of 13 October 1940, during The Blitz, a lone German aircraft dropped a single bomb on houses to the north of the station. The destruction of the houses caused the north end of the westbound platform tunnel to collapse, killing and injuring many people amongst those sheltering from the air raid. The train service was disrupted for two months.

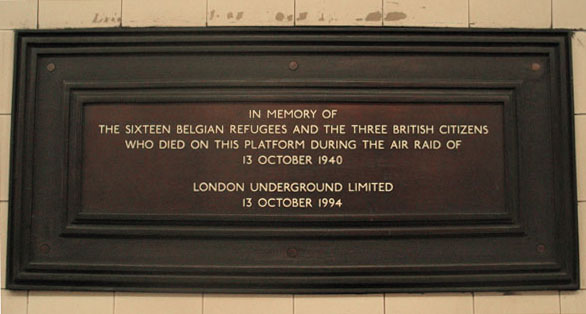
Memorial plaque placed in 1994 for the 1940 air raid victims

A memorial plaque (placed in the station in 1994, at the north end of the westbound platform) erroneously commemorates "sixteen Belgian refugees and ... three British citizens who died" in the attack. The records of the civilian deaths held by the Commonwealth War Graves Commission indicate that in fact sixteen people in total died at the scene – of whom three were Belgian refugees – with a seventeenth person dying of injuries in hospital the following day. Approximately twenty people were injured, but survived.

== Design ==
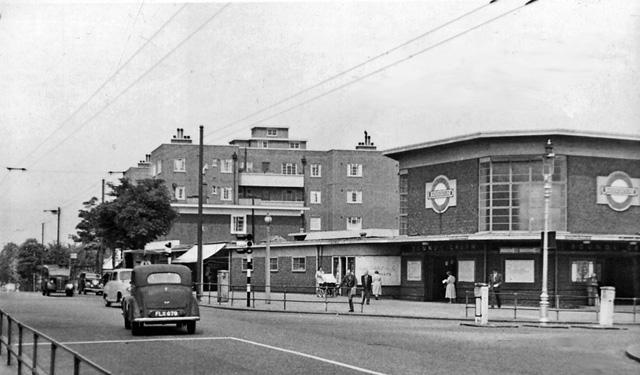
Station entrance viewing northwards in 1955, showing the unique eight-sided station building.

Architecturally, this tube station, designed in the typical "Box-style" of the architect Charles Holden by his colleague C. H. James, is a well-preserved example of the modernist house style of London Transport in the 1930s. The eight-sided frontage is flanked by a ventilation tower. The ticket hall is lit by four large windows with an imposing lattice of concrete beams in the ceiling; large London Underground roundels; and original bronze signs, ventilation grilles and information panel frames. The sub-surface areas of the station are finished in biscuit-coloured tiles lined with red friezes. Holden's designs emphasised functionality combined with balanced geometry and the use of modern materials, especially glass and reinforced concrete. The historical significance of the station is emphasised by its involvement in the World War II blitz.

Unlike others on this extension, the station was not previously nationally listed as of special architectural interest, but in August 2008 an application was made to English Heritage for a listing recommendation and in January 2010 the station was listed as Grade II.

== Layout ==
Two escalators and a central fixed stairway connect the ticket hall with the platforms. The escalators were installed in 1989 and 1991, replacing the 1932 originals. The current escalators are Otis MH-B type of 15.8 m (52 ft) vertical rise.

The station's platform tunnels have, in common with those of Southgate, a diameter of 21 feet (6.4 metres). In contrast, the much busier Wood Green, Turnpike Lane and Manor House have 23-foot (7-metre) diameter platform tunnels. The construction of "suicide pits" between the rails was also innovative; these were built in connection with a system of passageways under the platforms to give access to the track.

== Improvements ==
The station was refurbished in 2007 as part of Transport for London's £10 billion Investment Programme. The works were carried out at night and in a series of weekend closures. This work involved the restoration of heritage features and included the upgrading of CCTV cameras, retiling and decorating the station, repairs to the roof and exterior, platform resurfacing and the installation of Help Points. New train indicators were installed. The station was restored to its original condition, complete with red tiled borders. The cable trays above the frieze level are grey. The ticket hall has been retiled light and dark grey with wooden doors to station accommodation revarnished.

== Services and connections ==
=== Services ===
Bounds Green station is on the Piccadilly line in London fare zones 3 and 4. It is between Wood Green to the west and Arnos Grove to the east. Train frequencies vary throughout the day, but generally operate every 2–5 minutes between 06:53 and 00:59 eastbound, and between 05:27 and 00:09 westbound.

Preceding station	London Underground	Following station
Wood Green towards Uxbridge, Rayners Lane or Heathrow Airport (Terminal 4 or Terminal 5)	Piccadilly line	Arnos Grove towards Cockfosters or Arnos Grove

=== Connections ===
The station is served by various day and nighttime London Bus routes.

== Nearby places ==
- Bounds Green
- Bowes Park
- Muswell Hill
- Wood Green

== Bibliography ==
- Horne, Mike (2007). The Piccadilly Tube – A History of the First Hundred Years. London: Capital Transport. ISBN 978-1-85414-305-1.
