= South Tottenham railway station =

London Overground station

South Tottenham
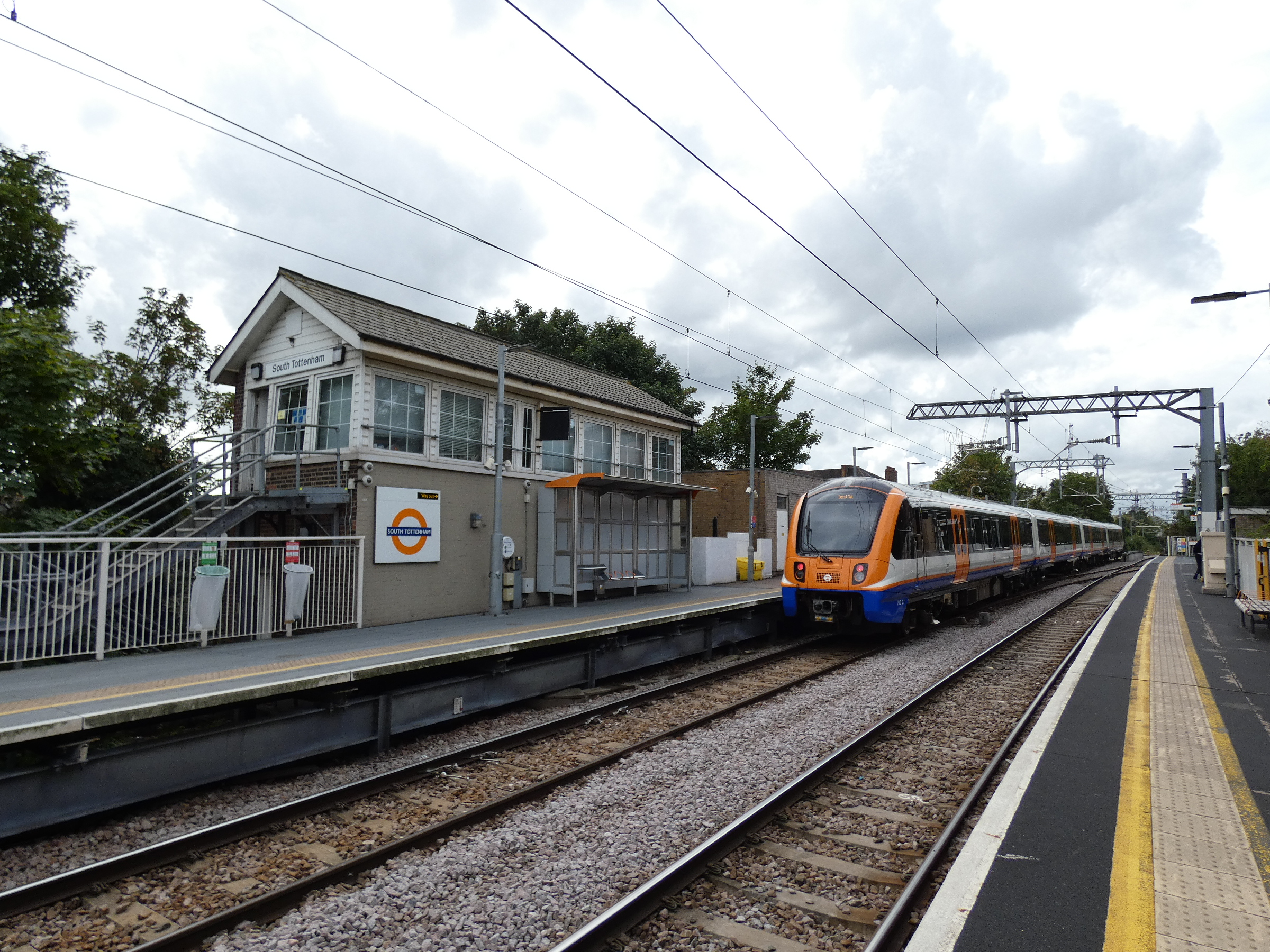
- South Tottenham station
- Interactive map of South Tottenham

General information
- Location: South Tottenham
- Local authority: London Borough of Haringey
- Managed by: London Overground
- Owner: Network Rail
- Station code: STO
- DfT category: E
- Number of platforms: 2
- Accessible: Yes
- Fare zone: 3
- OSI: Seven Sisters

National Rail annual entry and exit
- 2020–21: ▼0.683 million
- 2021–22: ▲1.054 million
- 2022–23: ▲1.130 million
- 2023–24: ▲1.260 million
- 2024–25: ▲1.357 million

Key dates
- 1 May 1871: Opened

Other information
- External links: Departures; Facilities
- Coordinates: 51.5802°N 0.072°W

South Tottenham is a railway station on the Suffragette line of the London Overground. It is located on the eastern side of the A10 High Road in Tottenham, North London, 5 miles 69 chains (9.4 km) from St Pancras (measured via Kentish Town and Mortimer Street Junction) and situated between Harringay Green Lanes and Blackhorse Road. It is in London fare zone 3, in the London Borough of Haringey.

South Tottenham to Seven Sisters station (on the Weaver line of the London Overground and the Victoria line of the London Underground) is considered an official out-of-station interchange by the National Rail timetable, and involves a short walk. This link will become fixed under the planned route for Crossrail 2, which sees a double-ended underground station built linking together South Tottenham and Seven Sisters stations.

== History ==
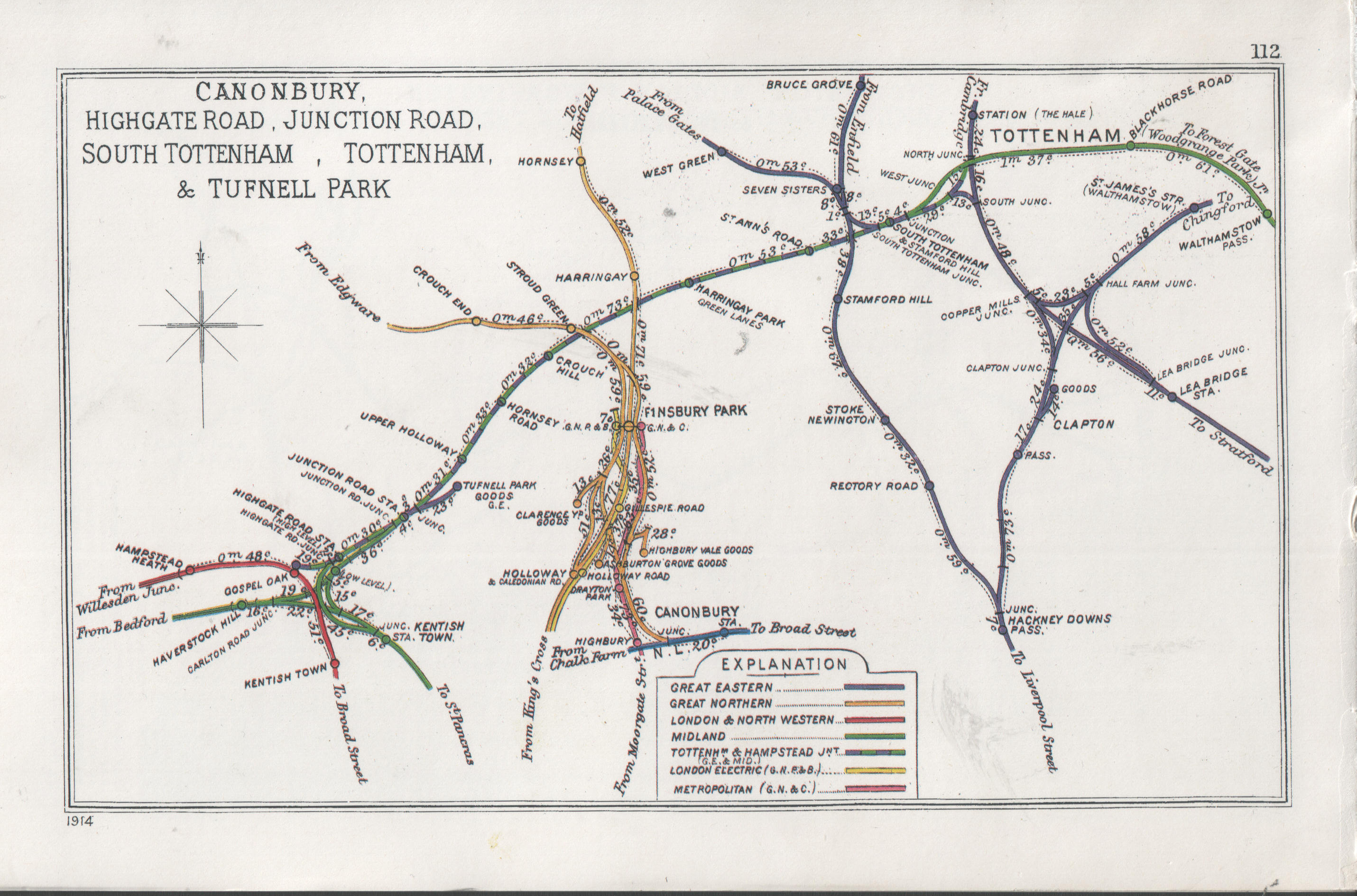
Map dated 1914, showing South Tottenham station top right, on the "Tottenhm & Hampstead Jnt. (G.E. and Mid.)" railway

Opened as 'South Tottenham and Stamford Hill' station on 1 May 1871, on the Tottenham and Hampstead Junction Railway, it was renamed 'South Tottenham' in 1949.

== The station today ==
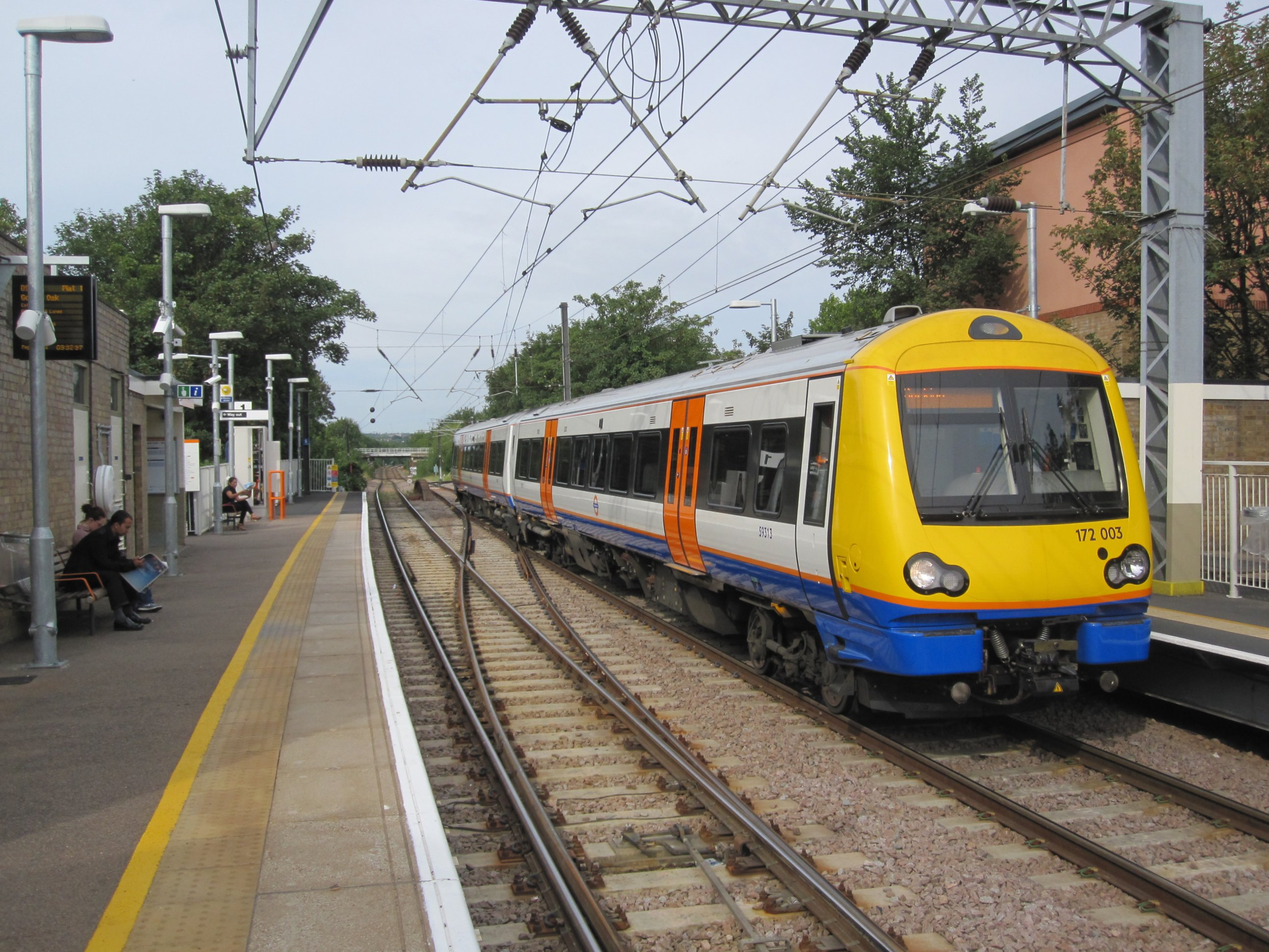
Class 172 Turbostar at the station in 2011

A short distance west of the station, on the far side of the A10, there is a single east-to-north spur towards Seven Sisters. To allow this to be reached by westbound trains, there is a facing crossover, located in the platform area.

A short distance to the east of the station, there is a double turnout branching to the south, to reach the eastern route of the two north–south Lea Valley Lines. Visually from the platforms, this looks like it is the main line, since the main tracks curve to the north from the junction. (In fact, it was the original main line, since the Tottenham and Forest Gate Railway eastwards was a later addition.)

Both curves were formerly part of the route used by trains on the Palace Gates Line (which then continued onwards to North Woolwich to serve the docks) but these days see infrequent use, with just one booked London Overground passenger train, which travels between Liverpool Street and Enfield Town via Stratford and Seven Sisters, in one direction only. This surviving parliamentary train does not however stop at South Tottenham. As of September 2025, this service is still running (along with a Fridays-excepted late-night service in the opposite direction). Some cross-London freight trains also use the route to/from Tottenham South Junction to access the North London Line at Gospel Oak (before continuing west or north). The station has been receiving investment, following the station management passing to London Overground in 2007.

== Connections ==
The station is served by London Buses routes 76, 149, 243, 279, 318, 476 and night route N73.

== Services ==
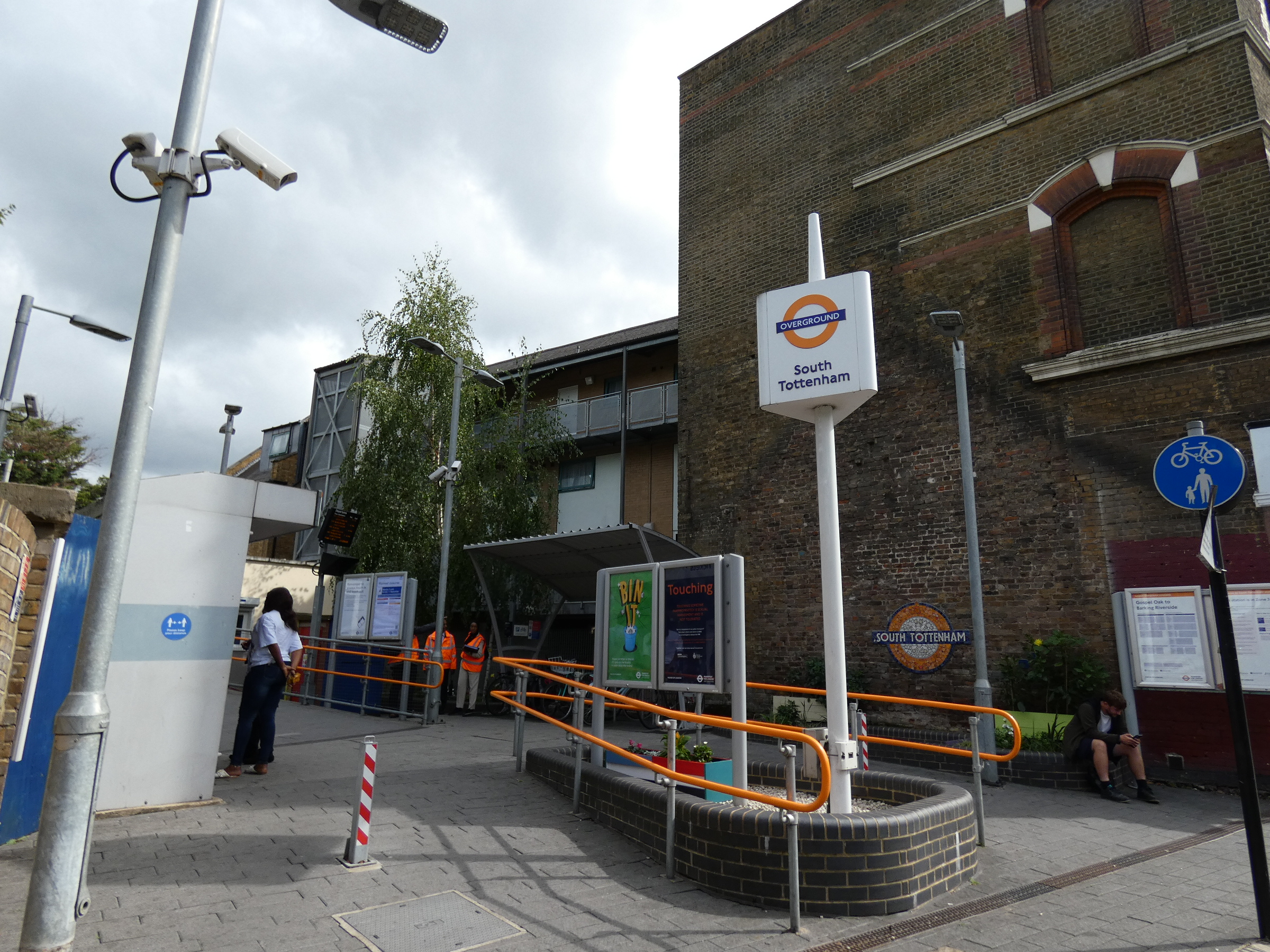
The entrance to South Tottenham Station

All services at South Tottenham are operated by London Overground using Class 710 EMUs.

The typical off-peak service is four trains per hour in each direction between Gospel Oak and Barking Riverside. During the late evenings, the service is reduced to three trains per hour in each direction.

Preceding station	London Overground	Following station
Harringay Green Lanes towards Gospel Oak	Suffragette line Gospel Oak to Barking line	Blackhorse Road towards Barking Riverside
	Disused railways	
St Ann's Road	Tottenham and Hampstead Junction Railway	Tottenham Hale
St Ann's Road	Tottenham and Forest Gate Railway	Blackhorse Road
Seven Sisters	Great Eastern Railway Palace Gates Line	Lea Bridge
