= West Green railway station =

Former railway station in England

West Green
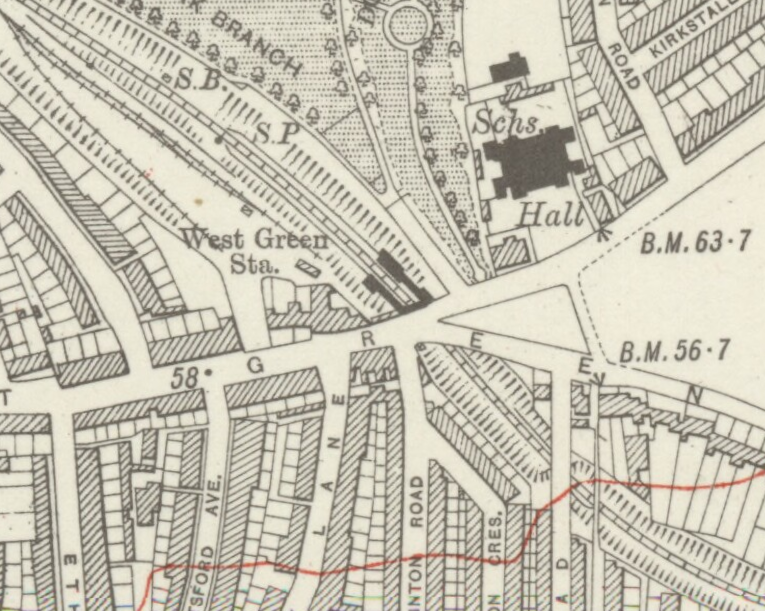
- West Green station on a 1920 map

- Location of West Green in Greater London
- Location: Tottenham
- Owner: Great Eastern Railway
- Number of platforms: 2

Key dates
- 1 January 1878: Opened
- 7 January 1963: closed for passengers
- 7 December 1964: Closed for freight
- Replaced by: none

Other information
- Coordinates: 51.58698°N 0.08886°W

West Green railway station was on the abandoned Palace Gates Line in North London. It was in West Green on the north side of West Green Road, west of the junction with Philip Lane, and near the Black Boy public house. The Great Eastern Railway opened it on 1 January 1878. Competition from nearby railway lines and the Underground Piccadilly line rendered the Palace Gates line unprofitable and the line and the station were closed for passenger services on 7 January 1963 and for freight on 7 December 1964 by British Rail.

Route of Palace Gates Line highlighted on a 1900 map

Afterwards the shallow cutting that housed the station was filled in and the site is now occupied by a school and sports field. Two small buildings from the station frontage were used as shops until their demolition in August 2003.

Preceding station	Disused railways	Following station
Noel Park; Line and station closed	Great Eastern Railway; Palace Gates Line	Seven Sisters; Line closed, station open
