= Bowes Park railway station =

National Rail station in London, England

Bowes Park
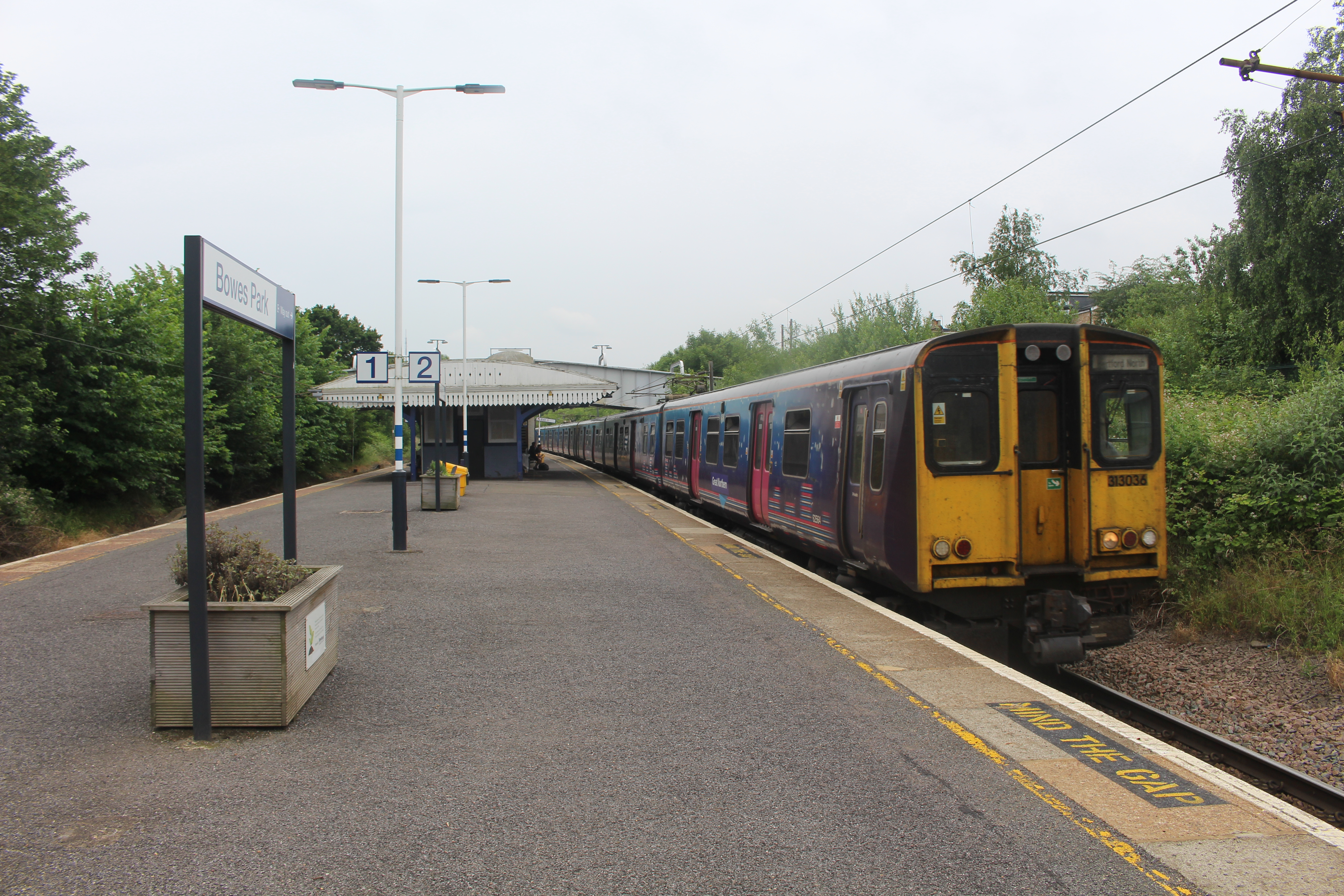
- Interactive map of Bowes Park

General information
- Location: Bowes Park
- Local authority: London Borough of Haringey
- Managed by: Great Northern
- Station code: BOP
- DfT category: E
- Number of platforms: 2
- Fare zone: 3 and 4
- OSI: Bounds Green

National Rail annual entry and exit
- 2020–21: ▼0.158 million
- 2021–22: ▲0.307 million
- 2022–23: ▲0.403 million
- 2023–24: ▲0.427 million
- 2024–25: ▲0.525 million

Key dates
- 1880: Opened

Other information
- External links: Departures; Facilities
- Coordinates: 51.6078°N 0.1209°W

Bowes Park railway station is in the London Borough of Haringey in north London, and is on the boundary of London fare zone 3 and 4. It is 5 miles 55 chains (5.69 miles, 9.15 km) down the line from London King's Cross. The station and all trains serving it are operated by Great Northern, on the Hertford Loop Line. It was first opened by the GNR in 1880, some nine years after the Loop Line itself was completed.

The station is a short walk from Bounds Green Underground station on the Piccadilly line, with which it is a valid out-of-station interchange. It has an unusual location in that it is situated between two quiet residential cul-de-sacs and is accessed from a footbridge over the railway line which divides those streets.

Bowes Park is the only station on the entire Hertford Loop with an island platform.

In autumn 2008, a new Shere FASTticket self-service ticket machine, accepting both cash and credit cards, was installed here (and similarly at other local Govia Thameslink Railway stations).

To the north of the station is a single siding in between the two running tracks which is occasionally used to turn around trains heading to Bounds Green Depot just north of Alexandra Palace. A connection to the now disused GER Palace Gates Line whose terminus, Palace Gates (Wood Green), lay just to the south, was made in 1929.

== Services ==
All services at Bowes Park are operated by Great Northern using Class 717 EMUs.

The typical off-peak service in trains per hour is:

- 2 tph to Moorgate
- 2 tph to Stevenage via Hertford North

Additional services call at the station during the peak hours.

Preceding station	National Rail	Following station
Alexandra Palace	Great Northern Hertford Loop Line	Palmers Green

== Ticketing ==
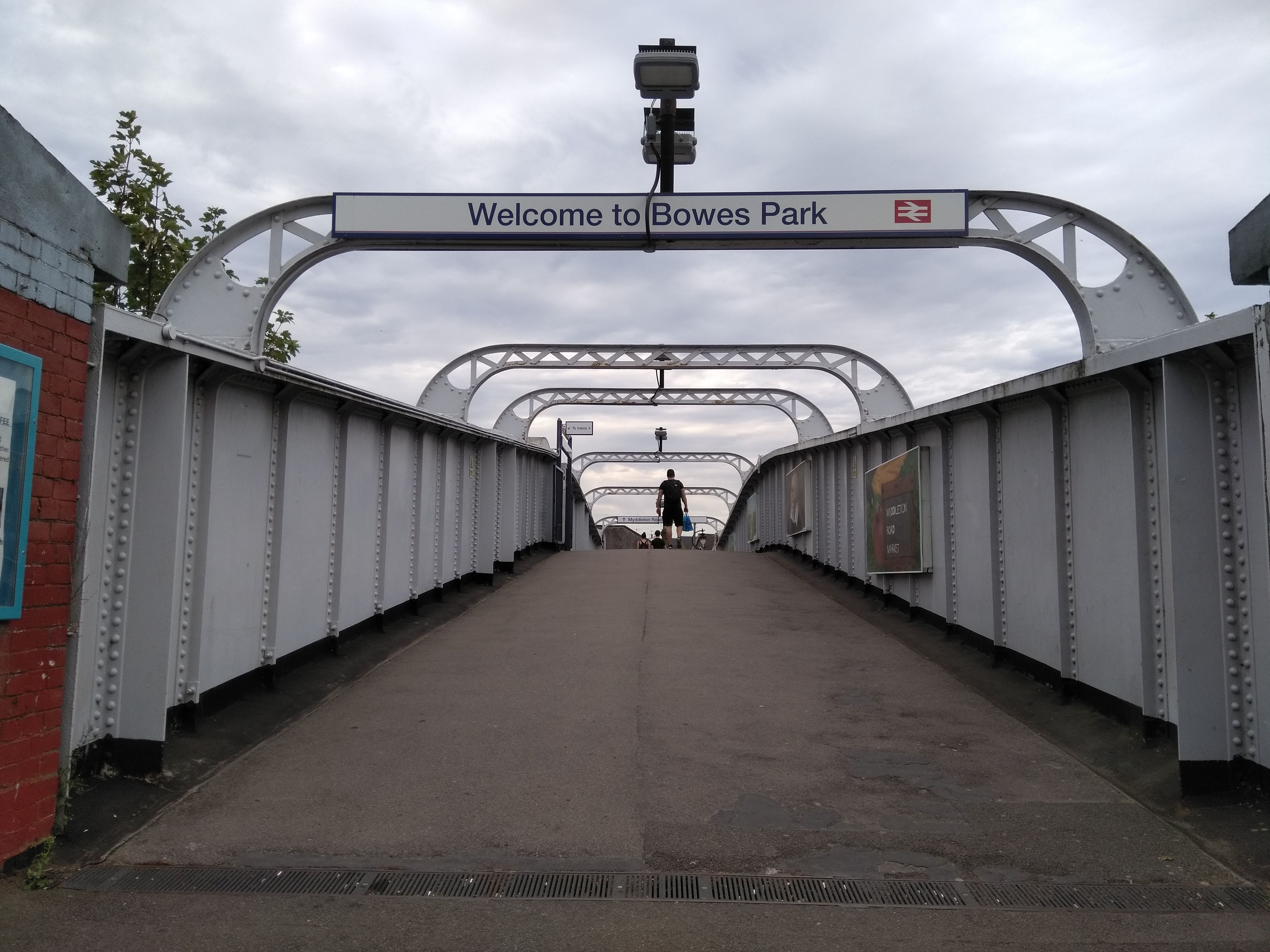
The footbridge over Bowes Park Station which doubles as its entrance

Oyster pay and go has been accepted at the station since 2 January 2010.
