= Manor House tube station =

London Underground station

Manor House
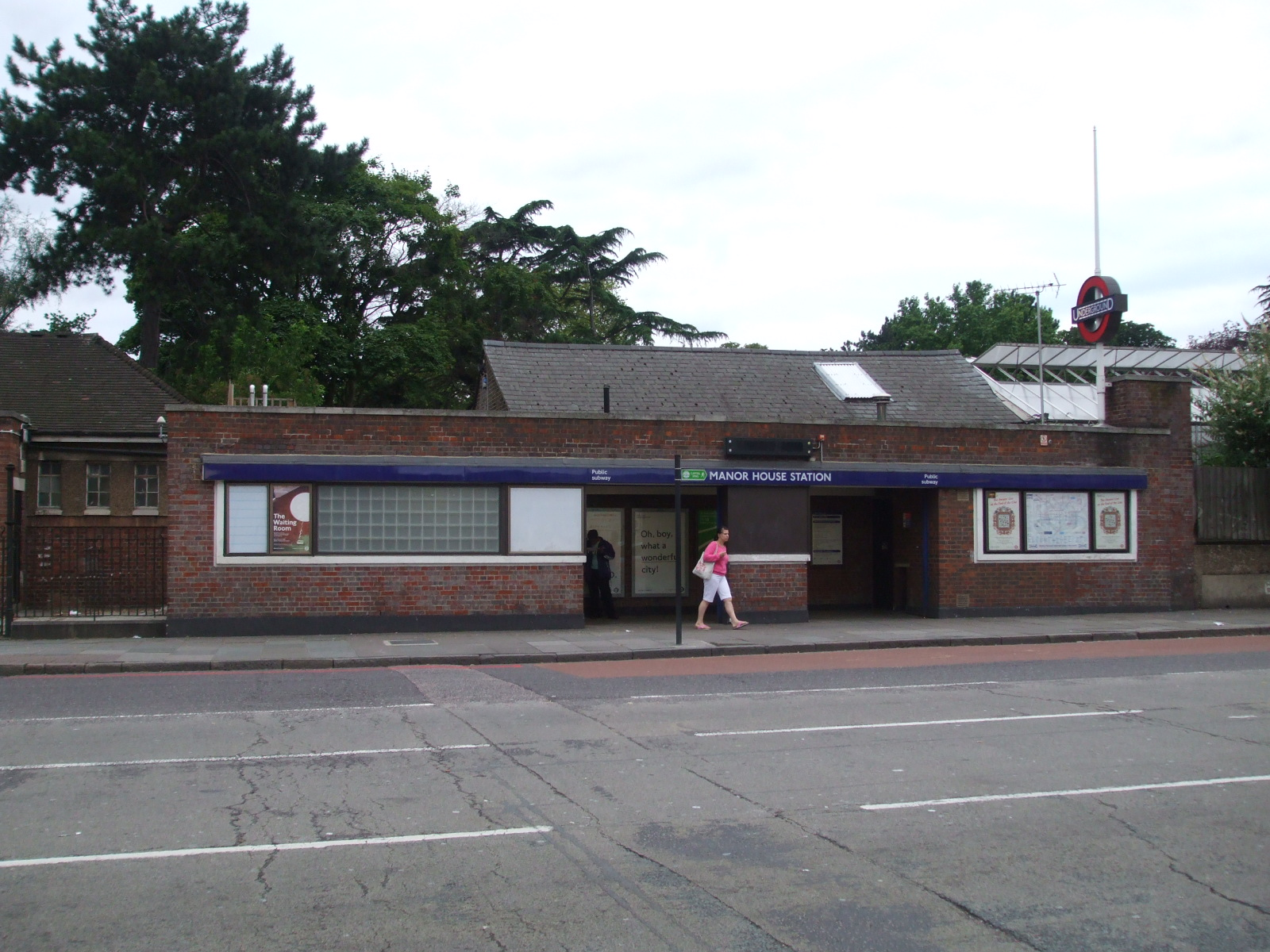
- Station entrance
- Interactive map of Manor House

General information
- Location: Manor House/Harringay
- Local authority: London Borough of Hackney/London Borough of Haringey
- Managed by: London Underground
- Number of platforms: 2
- Fare zone: 2 and 3

London Underground annual entry and exit
- 2021: ▼3.59 million
- 2022: ▲6.02 million
- 2023: ▼5.96 million
- 2024: ▼5.75 million
- 2025: ▼5.40 million

Key dates
- 19 September 1932: Opened

Other information
- External links: TfL station info page
- Coordinates: 51.5708°N 0.0961°W

Manor House is a London Underground station. It is on the Piccadilly line, between Finsbury Park and Turnpike Lane stations. The station is on the boundary between London fare zone 2 and 3. It straddles the border between the London Boroughs of Hackney and Haringey, the postal address and three of the entrances being in the former, and one entrance in the latter.

== Description ==
The station is situated at the junction of Seven Sisters Road and Green Lanes. Named after the former public house that used to be located on the crossroads, it was designed by Charles Holden and opened on 19 September 1932.

Like all stations on the Cockfosters extension, Manor House station set new aesthetic standards, not previously seen on London's Underground. The sub-surface areas of the station were tiled in biscuit coloured tiles lined with blue friezes (refurbished in 2005).

When first constructed, the station was equipped with nine street level entrances, two of which gave access to tram routes to and from Tottenham, Edmonton and Stamford Hill via tramway island exits into Seven Sisters Road. The last of these tram services were withdrawn in 1938 and replaced by trolleybuses and the exits were removed in 1951. There are now seven exits arranged around the crossroads under which the station is located:

- Exit 1: Seven Sisters Road east, north side, (for buses towards Stamford Hill)
- Exit 2: Seven Sisters Road east, south side (for buses towards Finsbury Park)
- Exit 3: Green Lanes south, east side (for buses towards Newington Green)
- Exit 4: Green Lanes south, west side (for buses towards Harringay)
- Exit 5: Seven Sisters Road west, south side (for buses towards Finsbury Park)
- Exit 6: Green Lanes north, west side (for buses towards Harringay) (See image captioned Station Entrance in top infobox)
- Exit 7: Green Lanes north, east side (for buses towards Newington Green).

The station tunnels have, in common with those of Turnpike Lane and Wood Green, a diameter of 23 feet (7 metres) and were designed for the greater volume of traffic expected. In contrast, Bounds Green and Southgate have only 21 foot (6.4 metres) diameter platform tunnels. The construction of "suicide pits" between the rails was also innovative. These were built in connection with a system of passageways under the platforms to give access to the track.

Next to the northern exit is the former Metropolitan Electric Tramways Headquarters (M.E.T) building, later the Eastern Divisional Office of London Transport Buses.

== Plan to transfer station to the Victoria line ==
During the planning of the Victoria line, a proposal to transfer Manor House station to the Victoria line was put forward. New tunnels were also proposed for the Piccadilly line between Finsbury Park and Turnpike Lane, which would have considerably reduced the travelling time from outer North London to Central London. The inconvenience caused during re-construction, as well as the cost, ensured that the ideas were not pursued.

The Victoria line tunnels as built run underneath the station. At the northern end of the eastbound (towards Cockfosters) platform one can hear Victoria line trains running beneath.

== Connections ==
Day and nighttime London Buses routes serve the station.

Preceding station	London Underground	Following station
Finsbury Park towards Uxbridge, Rayners Lane or Heathrow Airport (Terminal 4 or Terminal 5)	Piccadilly line	Turnpike Lane towards Cockfosters or Arnos Grove
