= Palace Gates railway station =

Closed railway station in Wood Green, London

Palace Gates
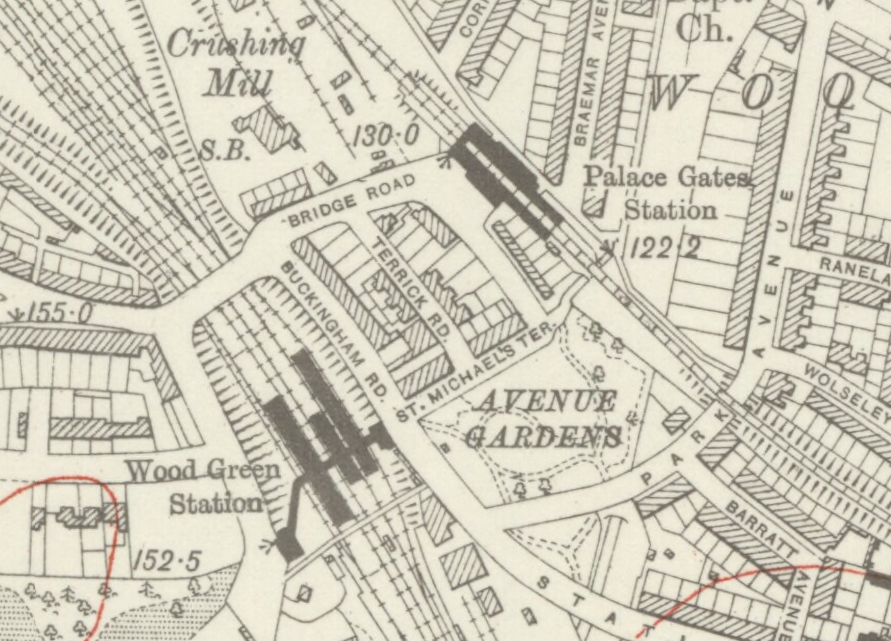
- Palace Gates station on a 1920 map

- Location of Palace Gates in Greater London
- Location: Wood Green
- Owner: Great Eastern Railway
- Number of platforms: 2

Key dates
- 1878: Opened
- 1963: closed for passengers
- 1964: Closed for freight
- Replaced by: none

Other information
- Coordinates: 51.5995°N 0.1191°W

Palace Gates railway station was on the Palace Gates Line in Wood Green, north London, on the corner of Bridge Road and Dorset Road.

It was opened on 7 October 1878 by the Great Eastern Railway (GER) as terminus of the line that bore its name. The line had terminated at the previous station, Noel Park and Wood Green, since opening on 1 January 1878.

Route of Palace Gates Line highlighted on a 1900 map

The station was opened to provide a means by which the GER could transport passengers to the nearby Alexandra Palace. It was thus in competition with the nearby Wood Green (Alexandra Park) station - now Alexandra Palace station - on the Great Northern Railway and another Alexandra Palace station, on a branch line from Highgate, that used to be situated right alongside the Palace. A connection to Bowes Park on the GNR Hertford Loop Line, which runs just north of the site of the station, was made in 1929 but it was used only for occasional freight trains.

Competing as it did with other nearby railway lines and the Underground's Piccadilly line, by the 1960s the Palace Gates line was unprofitable and the line closed to passengers on 7 January 1963 and to freight on 5 October 1964. Following closure the station was demolished and housing built on most of the site. A short section of the station site at its north end is occupied by Network Rail sidings alongside which are traces of the platform ends. The remains of part of the embankment forming the southern approach to the station can still be seen, including the abutments for the bridge taking the line over Park Avenue.

Preceding station	Disused railways	Following station
Terminus	Great Eastern Railway; Palace Gates Line	Noel Park; Line and station closed
