= Bounds Green Depot =

Railway depot situated in North London

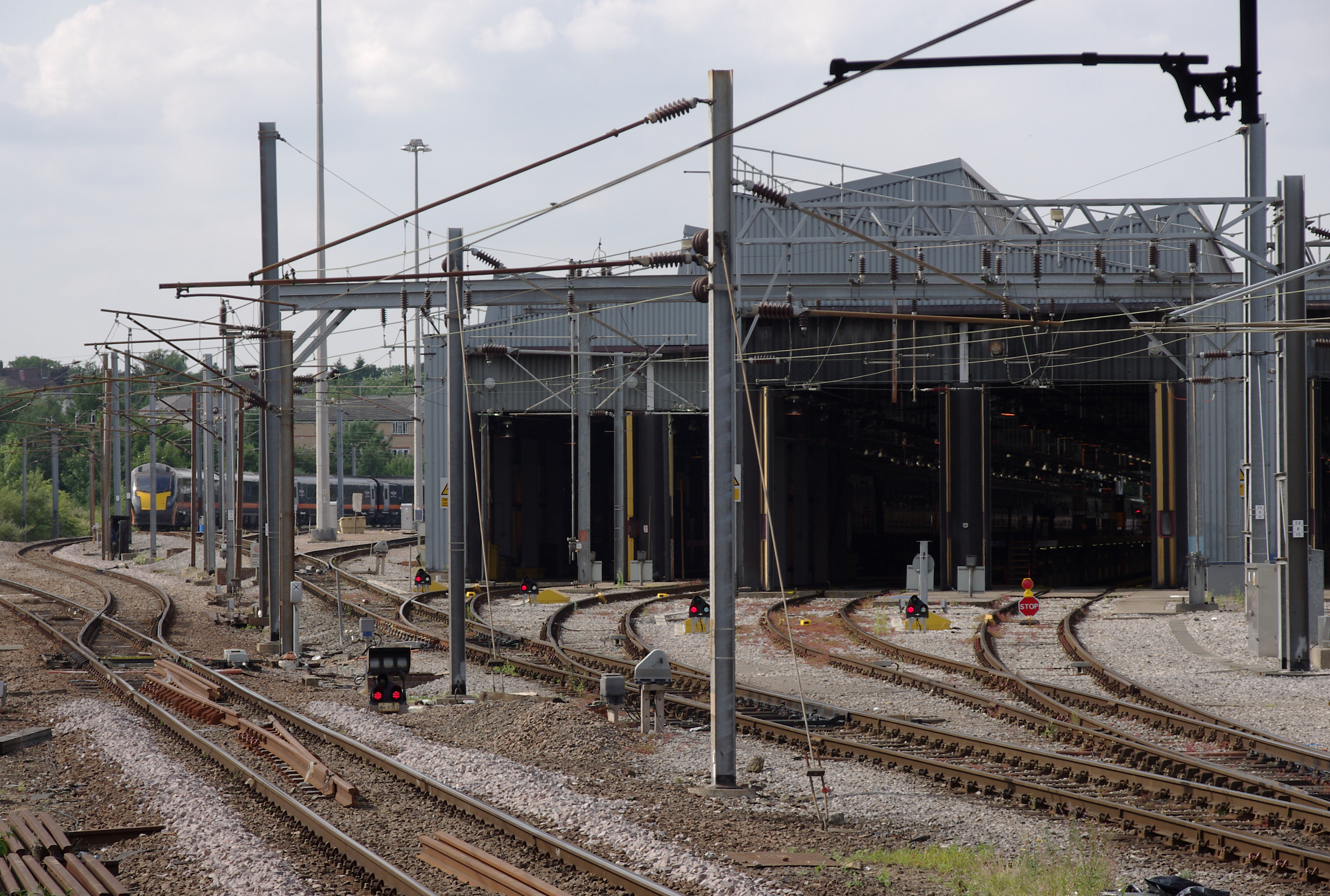
- Bounds Green, seen from Alexandra Palace station
- Interactive map of Bounds Green Depot

Location
- Location: London, England
- Coordinates: 51.6011°N 0.1224°W
- OS grid: TQ300908

Characteristics
- Owner: Network Rail
- Operator: Hitachi
- Depot code: BN (1976-)

History
- BR region: Eastern Region

Bounds Green Depot, also known as Bounds Green Train Maintenance Centre, is a traction maintenance depot situated in Bounds Green, North London. The depot is to the immediate north of Alexandra Palace railway station. It is presently operated by Hitachi and maintains AT300 units for London North Eastern Railway, Hull Trains and Lumo.

== History ==
In 1987, the depot had an allocation of Class 08s and HSTs and also maintained main line diesel locomotives. In January 2021, the Class 91 switched depots from Bounds Green to Neville Hill for the 12 members of the Class earmarked for retention in service.

== Allocation ==
- Class 08
- Class 800
- Class 801
- Class 802
- Class 803

== Former Allocation ==
- Class 91
