= Wood Green tube station =

London Underground station

Wood Green
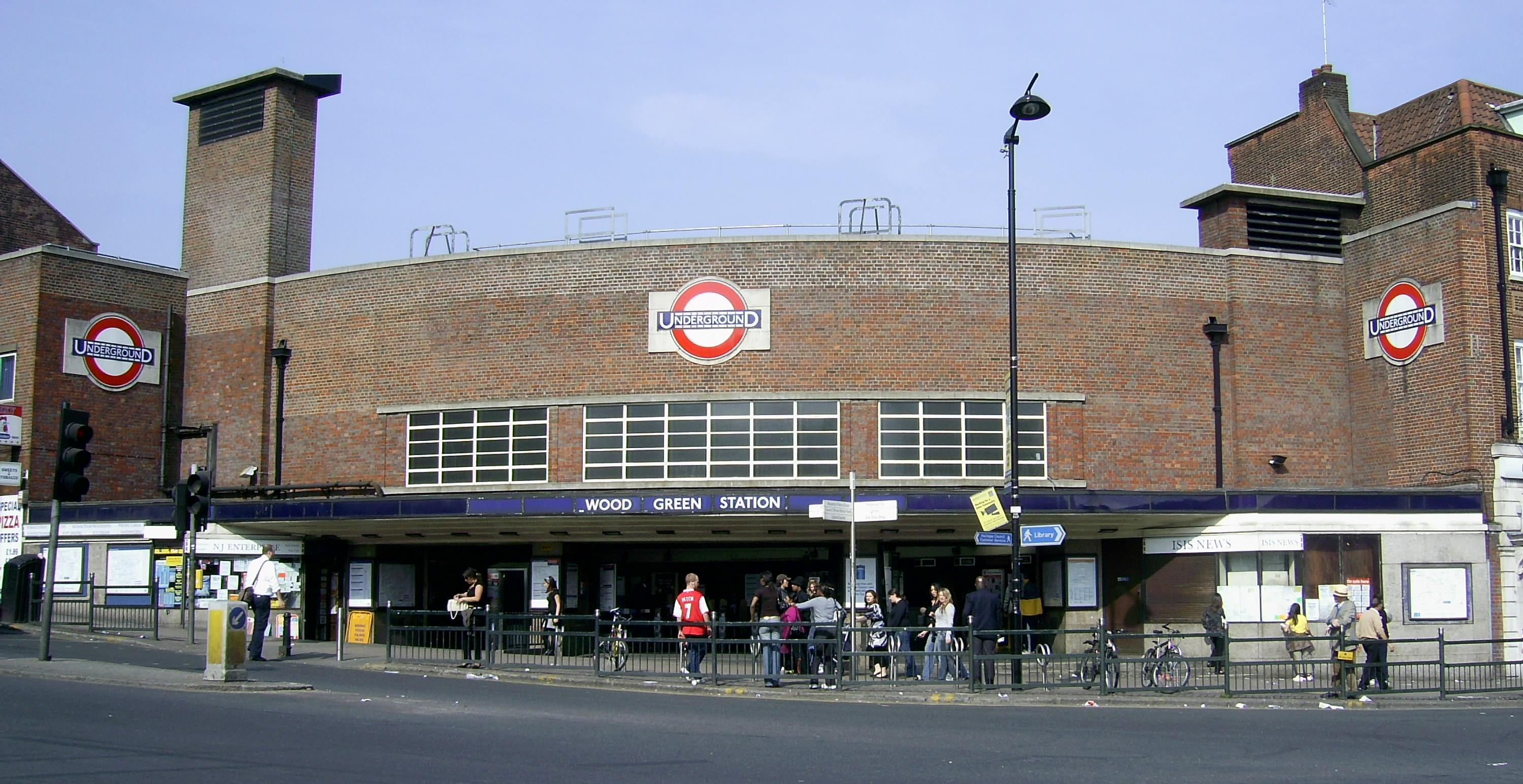
- Station entrance
- Interactive map of Wood Green

General information
- Location: Wood Green
- Local authority: London Borough of Haringey
- Managed by: London Underground
- Number of platforms: 2
- Fare zone: 3

London Underground annual entry and exit
- 2020: ▼6.58 million
- 2021: ▼5.43 million
- 2022: ▲9.12 million
- 2023: ▼9.09 million
- 2024: ▼8.61 million

Key dates
- 19 September 1932: Opened (Piccadilly Line)

Listed status
- Listing grade: II
- Entry number: 1401120
- Added to list: 20 July 2011; 14 years ago

Other information
- External links: TfL station info page
- Coordinates: 51.597°N 0.11°W

Wood Green is a London Underground station. It is on the Piccadilly line between Turnpike Lane and Bounds Green stations, and is in London fare zone 3. The station is located at the junction of High Road, Wood Green and Lordship Lane. It serves Wood Green Shopping City and the nearby Haringey Council administrative complex as well as a densely populated residential area. It is also the closest tube station to Alexandra Palace.

== History ==
The station opened on 19 September 1932, when the first section of the Cockfosters extension from Finsbury Park was opened.

Like all stations on the extension, Wood Green set new aesthetic standards, not previously seen on London's Underground. When the Cockfosters extension was planned, alternative names for this station – "Lordship Lane" and "Wood Green Central" – were considered, but rejected. Architecturally, this station, designed by Charles Holden, is a well-preserved example of the modernist house style Holden developed for London Transport in the 1930s. Located on a corner site, the main frontage is curved and is flanked by two ventilation towers, although these are later additions to the station. On the northern side, the structure also incorporates a shop which forms part of the parade in High Road. The other end of the parade features a large London Underground sub-station.

Since July 2011, the station has been a grade II listed building, which now means every station building between Turnpike Lane and Cockfosters is listed.

The below surface areas of the station are tiled in biscuit-coloured tiles lined with green friezes. The station tunnels – in common with those of Manor House and Turnpike Lane – are 23 ft (7 m) diameter and were designed for the larger number of passengers expected. In contrast, the platform tunnels at both Bounds Green and Southgate have a diameter of only 21 ft (6.4 m). The construction of "suicide pits" between the rails was a new innovation.

To the north of the station is a reversing siding. This is used to reverse northbound trains so that they can return towards central London. Until the 1990s, trains were regularly turned back here – now only one train per day Monday to Thursday is scheduled to reverse at Wood Green, with the siding used mostly in times of service disruption.

On 16 March 1976, the station was the site of a Provisional IRA bombing, when a device exploded on an empty train as it prepared to enter the reversing siding, before heading west to pick up football supporters at Arsenal. There was one passenger standing on the platform and was injured by flying glass.

The National Rail station now called Alexandra Palace was formerly called Wood Green; it was renamed in 1984.

== Crossrail ==
With the Chelsea-Hackney line, otherwise known as Crossrail 2 under discussion, proposals have included Wood Green as a possible station on a spur between Angel and Alexandra Palace stations. Wood Green station is a route option between New Southgate and Seven Sisters in the 2015 consultation.

Preceding station	London Underground	Following station
Turnpike Lane towards Uxbridge, Rayners Lane or Heathrow Airport (Terminal 4 or Terminal 5)	Piccadilly line	Bounds Green towards Cockfosters or Arnos Grove
