= Noel Park and Wood Green railway station =

Disused railway station in England

Noel Park and Wood Green
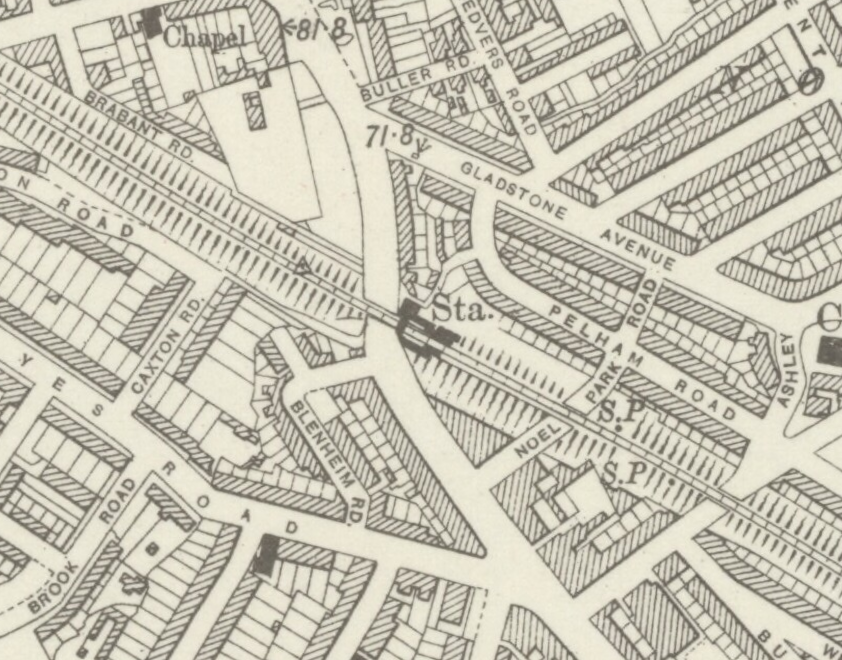
- Noel Park and Wood Green station on a 1920 map

- Location of Noel Park and Wood Green in Greater London
- Location: Wood Green
- Owner: Great Eastern Railway
- Number of platforms: 2

Key dates
- 1878: Opened
- 1963: closed for passengers
- 1964: Closed for freight
- Replaced by: none

Other information
- Coordinates: 51.59538°N 0.10727°W

Noel Park and Wood Green was a railway station on the Palace Gates Line in Wood Green, north London. It was located on the north-east side of The Broadway adjacent to Pelham Road. Its site is now occupied by Wood Green Shopping City.

== History ==
The station was opened by the Great Eastern Railway as Green Lanes on 1 January 1878, as the temporary terminus of the line – which was extended to Palace Gates (Wood Green) station on 7 October 1878.

Route of Palace Gates Line highlighted on a 1900 map

In 1884, as work began on the large Noel Park housing estate nearby, the station name was changed to Green Lanes & Noel Park; it was given its final name in 1902.

Competing as it did with other nearby railway lines and the London Underground's Piccadilly line, the Palace Gates line became unprofitable; the line and the station were closed for passenger services on 7 January 1963, and for freight on 7 December 1964. Following closure, the embankment that housed the station and the bridge over The Broadway was removed. Nothing is left of the station.

Preceding station	Disused railways	Following station
Palace Gates; Line and station closed	Great Eastern Railway; Palace Gates Line	West Green; Line and station closed
