= Alexandra Palace railway station =

National Rail station in London, England

Alexandra Palace
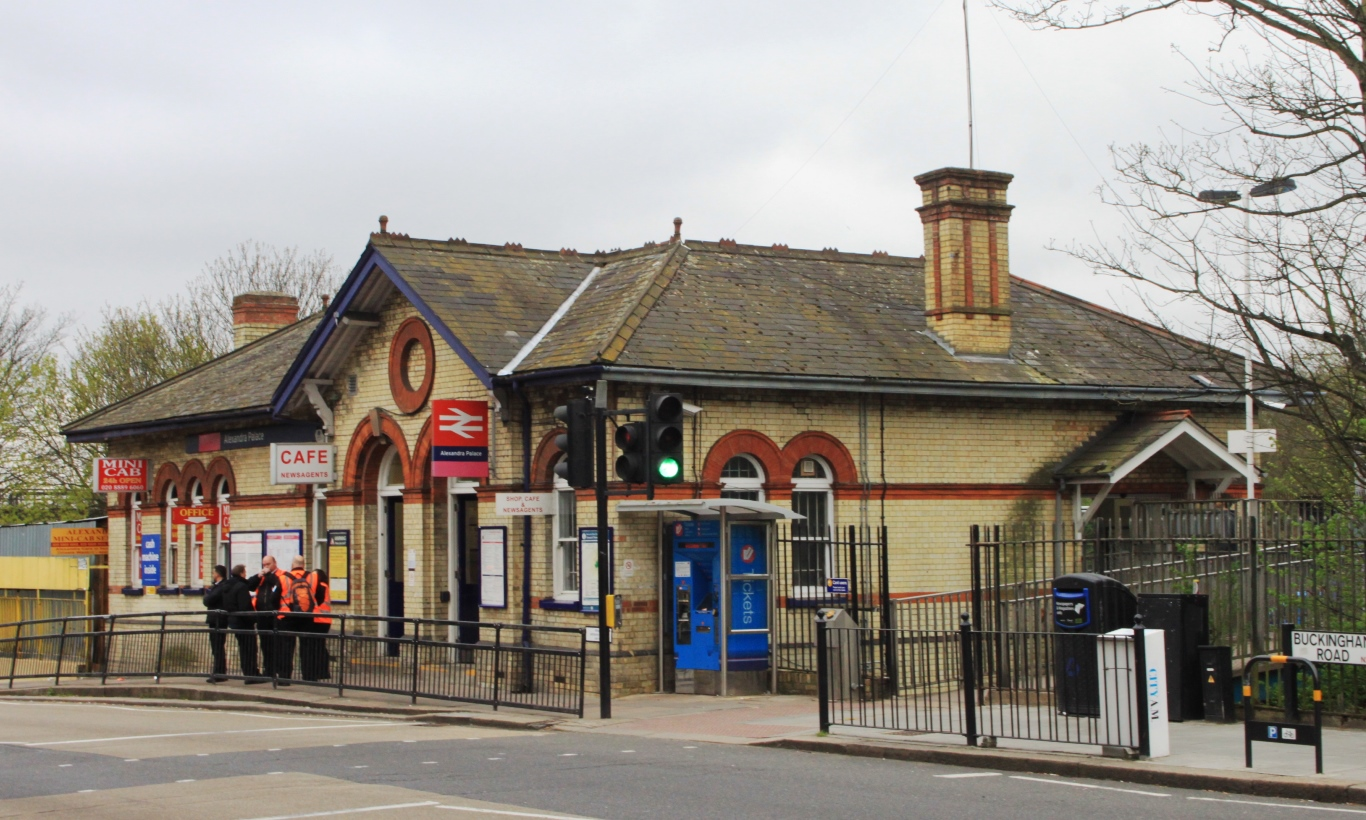
- The station buildings at street level
- Interactive map of Alexandra Palace

General information
- Location: Wood Green
- Local authority: London Borough of Haringey
- Managed by: Great Northern
- Station code: AAP
- DfT category: D
- Number of platforms: 4
- Tracks: 7
- Fare zone: 3

National Rail annual entry and exit
- 2020–21: ▼0.409 million
- Interchange: ▼23,507
- 2021–22: ▲0.969 million
- Interchange: ▲49,994
- 2022–23: ▲1.340 million
- Interchange: ▼43,873
- 2023–24: ▲1.596 million
- Interchange: ▼39,862
- 2024–25: ▲1.856 million
- Interchange: ▼37,178

Key dates
- 1 May 1859: Opened as Wood Green
- 1 August 1864: Renamed Wood Green (Alexandra Park)
- 18 March 1971: Renamed Wood Green
- 17 May 1982: Renamed Alexandra Palace

Other information
- External links: Departures; Facilities
- Coordinates: 51.5983°N 0.1197°W

Alexandra Palace railway station is on the Great Northern Route that forms part of the East Coast Main Line, and takes its name from the nearby Alexandra Palace in the London Borough of Haringey, north London. It is 4 miles 78 chains (8.0 km) down the line from London King's Cross and is situated between Hornsey and either New Southgate on the main line or Bowes Park on the Hertford Loop Line which diverges from the main line just north of Alexandra Palace.

It is in London fare zone 3. All trains serving it are operated by Great Northern.

It is the only surviving station of three that have served Alexandra Palace. A former station also named Alexandra Palace, sited actually at the venue, was on the Highgate-Alexandra Palace Line, while Palace Gates (Wood Green) station was on the Palace Gates Line.

Just outside the station to the north is Bounds Green train depot, used for storage and maintenance of the high-speed trains used on the main line. A line adjacent to the station platforms is used by shunters moving carriages and engines around in the depot.

It is proposed that the station should be a terminus on Crossrail 2.

== History ==
The station was opened by the Great Northern Railway (GNR) on 1 May 1859 as Wood Green, being renamed to Wood Green (Alexandra Park) in 1864. The GNR became part of the London and North Eastern Railway during the grouping of 1923. The line then passed on to the Eastern Region of British Railways on nationalisation in 1948. The station reverted to its original name of Wood Green on 18 March 1971, but was again renamed, this time to Alexandra Palace, on 17 May 1982.

Under plans approved in 1897, the station was to be the northern terminus for the Great Northern and Strand Railway (GN&SR), a tube railway supported by the GNR which would have run underground beneath the GNR's tracks to Finsbury Park and then into central London. The next GN&SR station to the south would have been Hornsey. The GN&SR route and stations north of Finsbury Park were cancelled in 1902 when the GN&SR was taken over by Charles Yerkes' consortium which planned to merge it with the Brompton and Piccadilly Circus Railway to form the Great Northern, Piccadilly and Brompton Railway from Finsbury Park to Hammersmith (now part of the London Underground's Piccadilly line).

When sectorisation was introduced, the station was served by Network SouthEast until the privatisation of British Rail.

In Autumn 2008, a new Shere FASTticket self-service ticket machine, accepting both cash and credit cards, was installed here (and similarly at other local First Capital Connect stations). Oyster card readers were installed at the station during 2008 and activated on 2 January 2010 for use with the Oyster Pay As You Go System.

In May 2013 it was announced that the station would be a terminus on the latest proposed route for Crossrail 2.

== Station layout ==
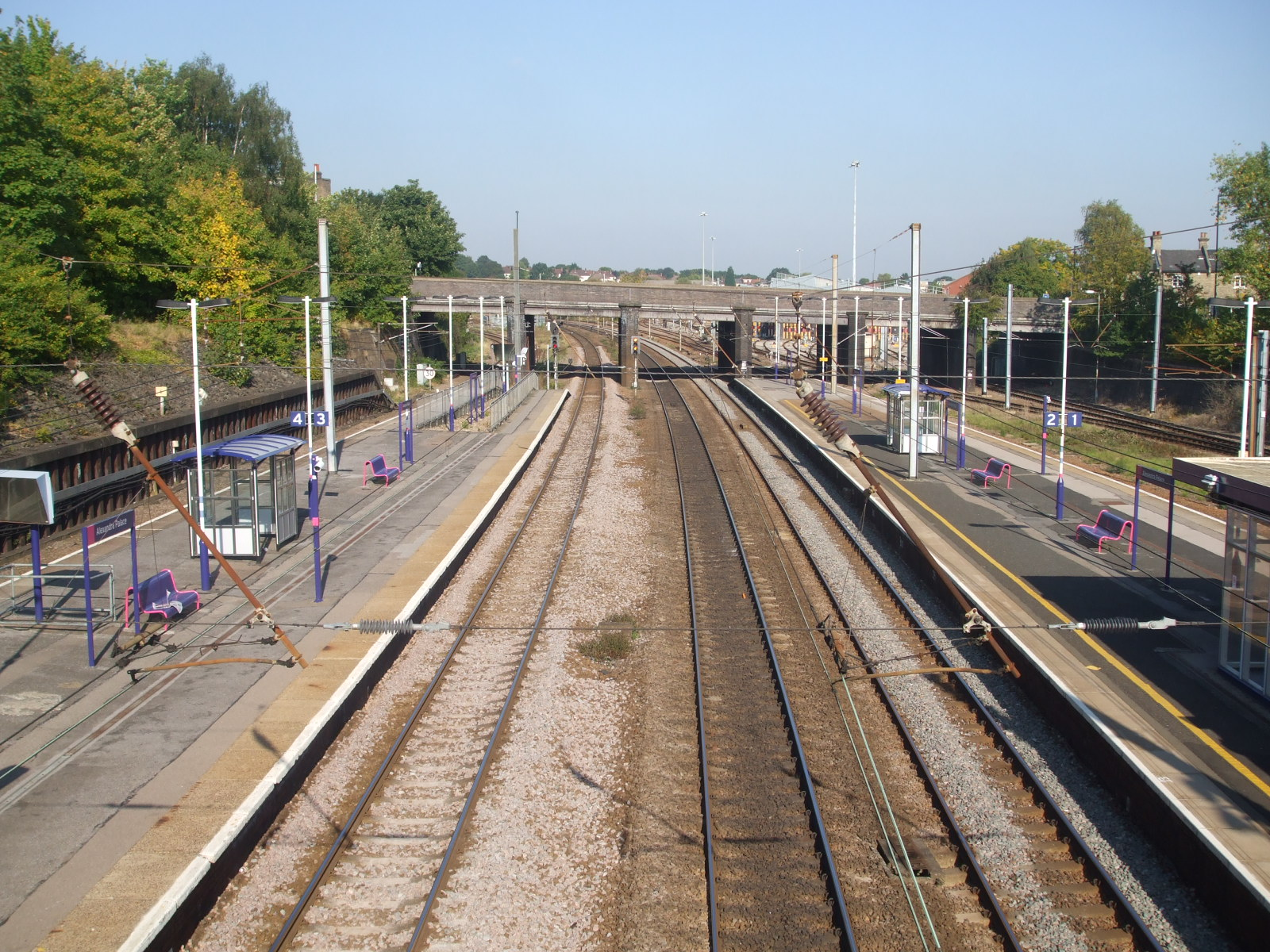
Looking north from the footbridge

The station has old buildings on Buckingham Road, which house a refreshment kiosk and ticket machines, with a modern footbridge connection to the platforms and across the tracks to Bedford Road. On the platforms there are only rudimentary modern buildings for public use.

On 9 December 2012 the old platforms 1 and 2 were closed for reconstruction. A temporary new platform 1 was provided to the east of the up slow line. All up (London-bound) trains which stop (served from either the Welwyn or Hertford directions) did so at this platform face. On 2 April 2013 the reconstructed platform 1 opened, on the west of the up slow line as before, now numbered as platform 2. This new platform is narrower than the former and the track has been moved to the west. The old platform 2 is permanently closed and has a fence along the edge. This work is part of a scheme to provide greater segregation of stopping, semi-fast and high-speed services in the section between Alexandra Palace and Finsbury Park, to allow a greater quantum of services.

The up fast line now has no platform face at this station. The down fast is a through road, without a platform face. Platforms 3 and 4 are faces on an island platform and provide for northbound local services. Platform 3 is used by northbound trains on the ECML down slow line and trains on the Hertford Loop Line use platform 4. Trains to/from Hertford must use the outer platform lines.

== Connections ==
London Buses routes 184 and W3 serve the station.

== Services ==
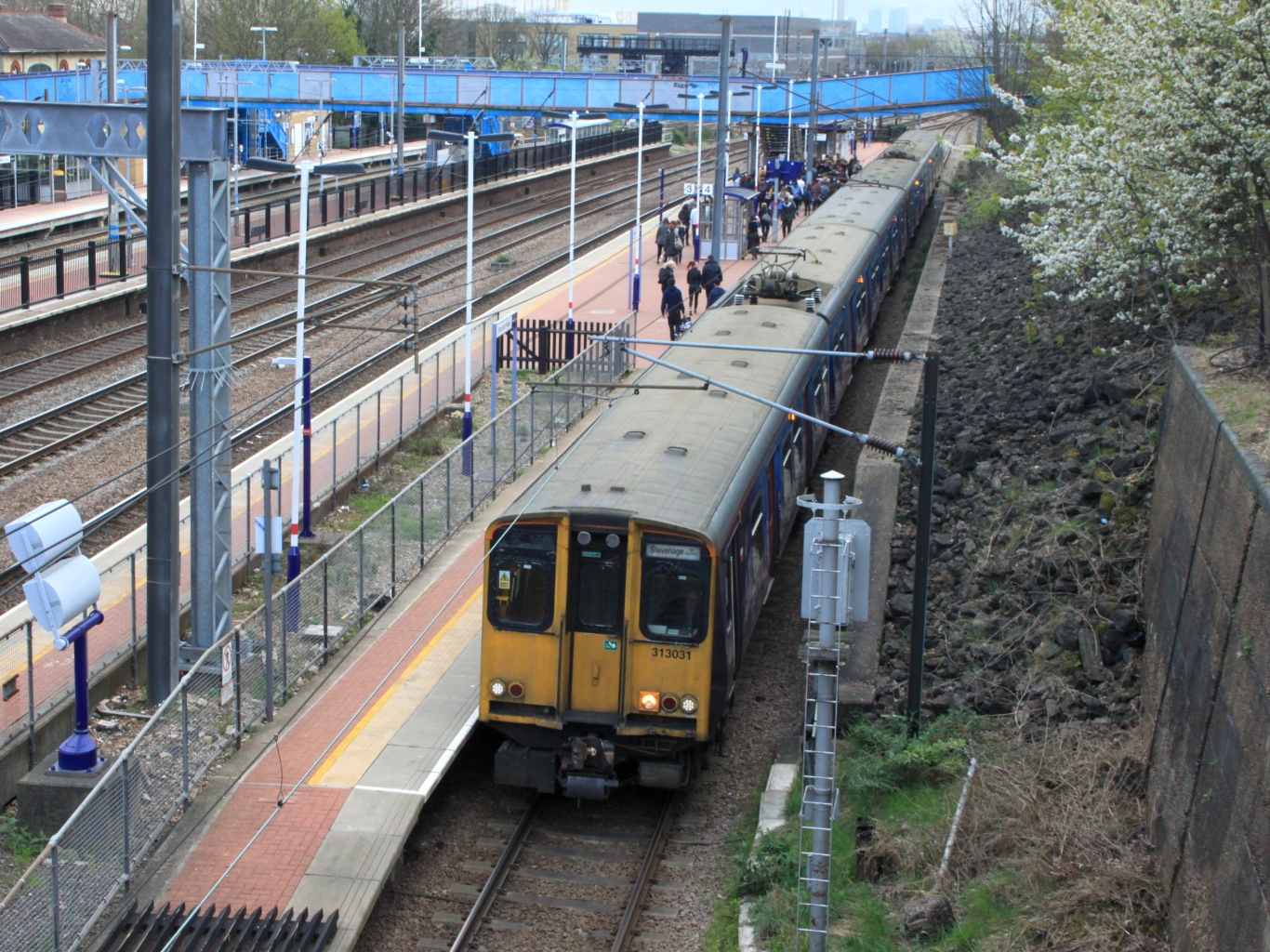
A Class 313 at Alexandra Palace on its way to Stevenage via Hertford.

All services at Alexandra Palace are operated by Great Northern using Class 387 and 717 EMUs

The typical off-peak service in trains per hour is:

- 2 tph to London King's Cross (calls at Finsbury Park only)
- 4 tph to Moorgate (all stations)
- 2 tph to Stevenage via Hertford North
- 2 tph to Welwyn Garden City (all stations)
- 2 tph to Letchworth Garden City of which 1 continues to Cambridge (semi-fast to Hatfield, then all stations thereafter)

Additional services call at the station during the peak hours on both main routes. This includes some trains that start or terminate at Gordon Hill. No Thameslink services stop here, but destinations on the network can be reached by changing at Finsbury Park.

Preceding station	National Rail	Following station
Finsbury Park	Great Northern Great Northern Route Semi-fast Services	Potters Bar
Hornsey	Great Northern Great Northern Route Stopping Services	New Southgate
Hornsey	Great Northern Hertford Loop Line	Bowes Park
	Abandoned Plans	
Preceding station	LUL	Following station
Hornsey towards Strand	Great Northern & Strand	Terminus

== Friends of Ally Pally Station ==
In 2016, local volunteers established the Friends of Ally Pally Station. The group has created a station community garden of over forty planters across the platforms, as well as collaborative art projects in the foyer with Studio 306, The Friends of Alexandra Park, Alexandra Palace and young local origami artist, Eddie Holden. They encourage collaboration in the community with all forms of stakeholders - garden centres, schools, artists, businesses, the Palace, the council and GNR.

The Friends have won several awards since their inception, including from the Community Rail Network ('It's Your Station' Silver and Gold Certificates 2017 and 2018, and Winner of Small Projects 2018 for 'Hop on a Train'), Rail Partnerships Small Projects winner 2018 for 'Sleepers Awake', building benches along with a Bach workshop led by local pianist Stephen Barron, and Haringey in Bloom (2017 and 2020). Much work was done in raising their profile and telling their story by Giles Christian, who died in 2019. A memorial was held for Christian on 31 March 2019, and a healing herb garden in his memory is situated on Platform 1, next to the Back Yard.

As well as holding monthly Gardening Parties and other events, the Friends are also a Rail User Group, representing passengers' needs. In 2020–21, they worked closely with GNR and Groundwork to guide deployment of the Passenger Benefit fund, enhancing shelters and adding significant new planters to Platforms 3 & 4.

In 2020 the Friends used lockdown to create the Bedford Rose Garden on a section of land given to them for community use by Network Rail. The garden has been built up with countless donations from locals, often passing by on their daily walks. It contains a great variety of roses, trees, climbing plants, fruit and vegetables and a pond.

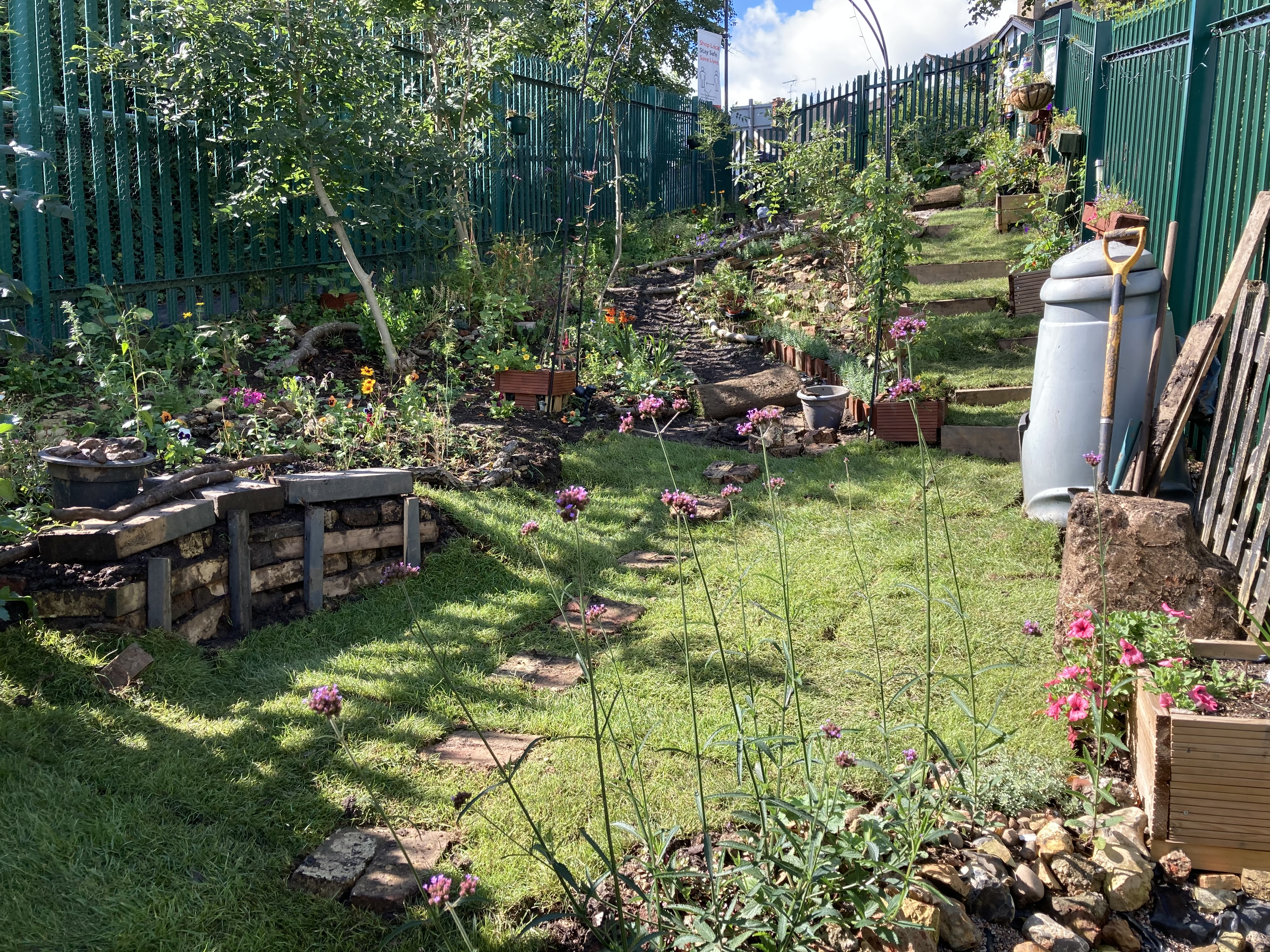
The Bedford Rose Garden
