= Leyton Midland Road railway station =

London Overground station

Leyton Midland Road
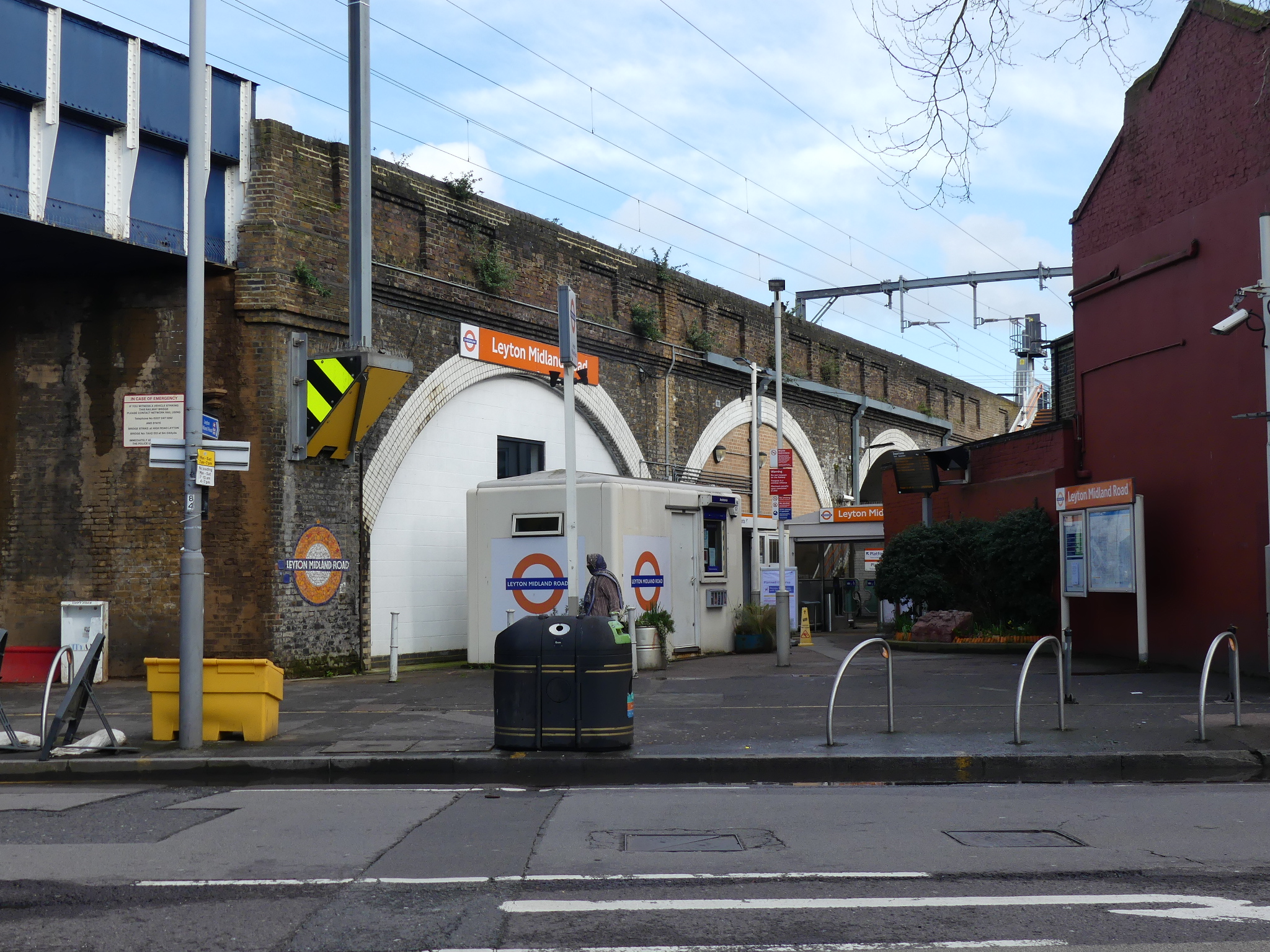
- Leyton Midland Road station entrance in 2024
- Interactive map of Leyton Midland Road

General information
- Location: Leyton
- Local authority: Waltham Forest
- Managed by: London Overground
- Owner: Network Rail
- Station code: LEM
- DfT category: E
- Number of platforms: 2
- Fare zone: 3

National Rail annual entry and exit
- 2020–21: ▼0.631 million
- 2021–22: ▲1.102 million
- 2022–23: ▲1.193 million
- 2023–24: ▲1.414 million
- 2024–25: ▲1.551 million

Key dates
- 9 July 1894: Opened as "Leyton"
- 1 May 1949: Renamed "Leyton Midland Road"
- 6 May 1968: Goods yard closed

Other information
- External links: Departures; Facilities
- Coordinates: 51.5693°N 0.0072°W

Leyton Midland Road is a London Overground station in Leyton of the London Borough of Waltham Forest. It is on the Suffragette line, 9 miles 18 chains (14.8 km) down the line from Gospel Oak and situated between Walthamstow Queen's Road and Leytonstone High Road stations in London fare zone 3. It is the closest railway station to Bakers Arms.

== History ==
The station opened on 9 July 1894 as part of the Tottenham and Forest Gate Railway and was originally called "Leyton".

On 17 August 1915, three explosive bombs from the German Zeppelin L.10 landed on or near the station, destroying the ticket office and a billiard hall in the arches under the platform and damaging several houses nearby. Four people were killed.

The station was renamed Leyton Midland Road on 1 May 1949. The goods yard, which was just beyond the station, closed on 6 May 1968. As with Leytonstone High Road and Wanstead Park stations, the booking office was built into the viaduct arch. By the 1980s all the old buildings had been removed and the Greater London Council built a new booking office on Midland Road itself. A few years later that was closed and demolished when, like other stations, Leyton Midland Road became unstaffed.

In common with other stations on the line, usage has risen greatly this century following improvements in train services and the reintroduction of station staff under London Overground, and peak-hour overcrowding of the two-car diesel trains became a major issue before electric trains were introduced from 2019. Electrification of the line was finally approved after a long campaign and was achieved for 2017. Services from the station were suspended for 8 months (June 2016 – February 2017) whilst the work was carried out.

== Design ==
Since the takeover by London Overground the station has benefited from a major refit including deep clean, new signing, a ticket machine and additional waiting shelters. The community garden which was started by members of the GOBLIN support group is tended by station staff. The station also contains help points and automatic ticket gates have now been installed. Controversially, the Midland Road entrance is now closed.

== Location ==
London Buses routes 69, 97 and W16 and night route N26 serve the station.

== Services ==
All services at Leyton Midland Road are operated by London Overground using Class 710 EMUs.

The typical off-peak service is four trains per hour in each direction between Gospel Oak and Barking Riverside. During the late evenings, the service is reduced to three trains per hour in each direction.

| Preceding station | London Overground | Following station |
|---|---|---|
| Walthamstow Queen's Road towards Gospel Oak | Suffragette line Gospel Oak to Barking line | Leytonstone High Road towards Barking Riverside |
