= Leytonstone railway station =

Leytonstone railway station may refer to:

- Leytonstone High Road railway station
- Leytonstone tube station
