= Manor Park railway station =

National Rail station in London, England

Manor Park
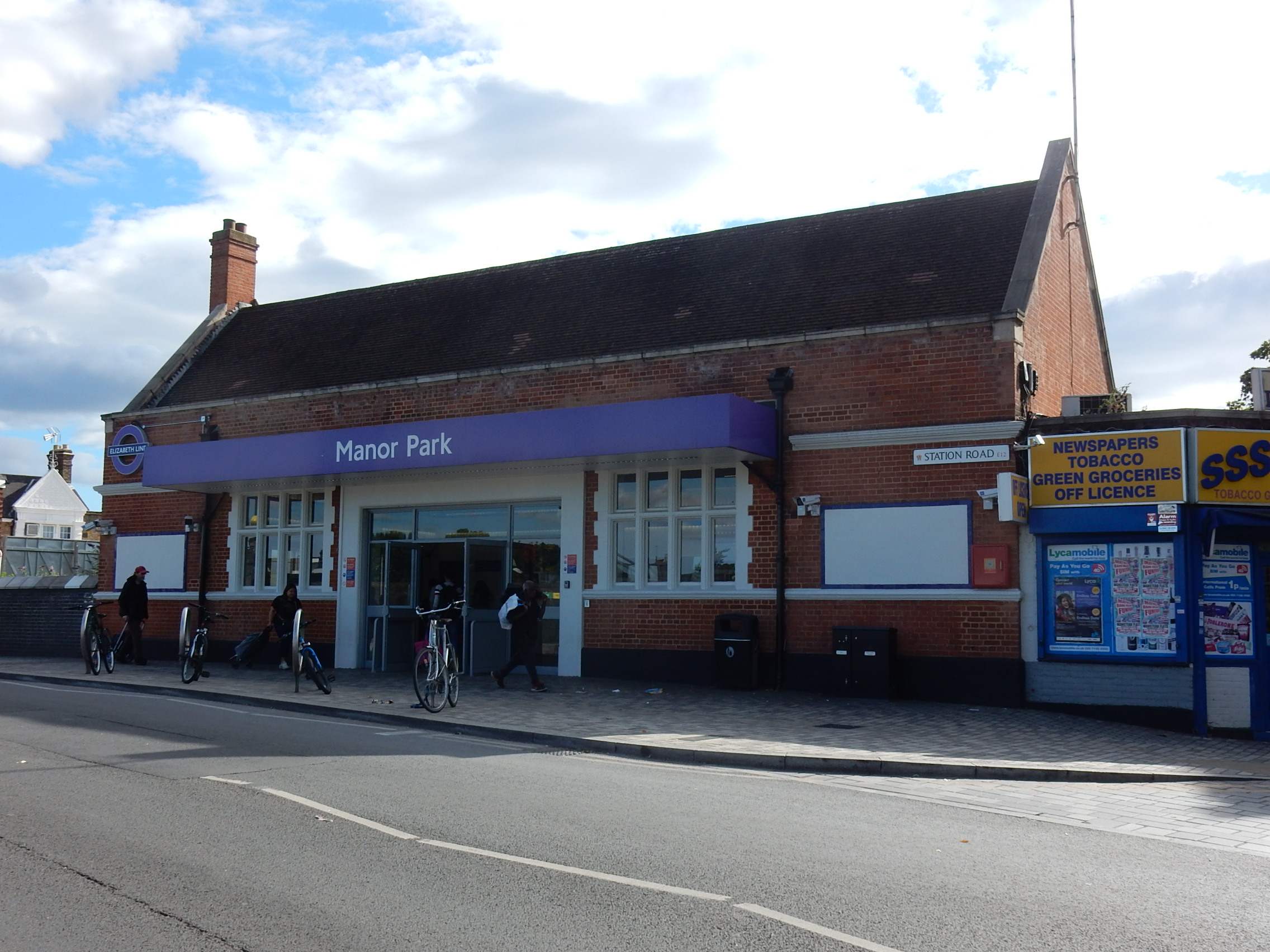
- Station entrance seen in July 2022
- Interactive map of Manor Park

General information
- Location: Manor Park
- Local authority: London Borough of Newham
- Managed by: Elizabeth line
- Owner: Network Rail
- Station code: MNP
- Number of platforms: 4+1 disused
- Accessible: Yes
- Fare zone: 3 and 4
- OSI: Woodgrange Park

National Rail annual entry and exit
- 2021–22: ▲1.977 million
- 2022–23: ▲3.720 million
- 2023–24: ▲5.371 million
- 2024–25: ▼4.427 million
- 2025–26: ▲4.766 million

Railway companies
- Pre-grouping: Great Eastern Railway
- Post-grouping: London and North Eastern Railway

Key dates
- 6 January 1873: Opened

Other information
- External links: Departures; Facilities
- Coordinates: 51.5526°N 0.0463°E

Manor Park railway station is on the Great Eastern Main Line serving Manor Park in the London Borough of Newham, east London. It is 6 miles 20 chains (10.1 km) down the line from London Liverpool Street and is situated between Forest Gate and Ilford. Its three-letter station code is MNP and it is in London fare zone 3 and 4. It is currently managed and served by the Elizabeth line.

Manor Park is a short walk from Woodgrange Park on the Gospel Oak to Barking line, and an out-of-station interchange is available one stop to the west, at Forest Gate, for Wanstead Park.

== History ==
=== Great Eastern Railway (1873-1922) ===
The railway through the site of Manor Park station was first built in 1839 by the Eastern Counties Railway as the first part of what was to become the Great Eastern Main Line, which was constructed between Mile End and Romford.

The original name for the station was Manor Park and Little Ilford. When the original line was built the Manor House had its own access road and bridge that crossed the railway line. Little Ilford referred to the settlement on the western bank of the River Roding opposite Ilford.

When the station opened on 6 January 1873 the land north of the station was undeveloped. The access bridge was replaced by a bridge (Forest Drive) over the railway at the station, and the station building was located on this. The Manor House itself succumbed to housing development and had disappeared by the 1890s. A signal box was provided on the upside of the line west of the station.

A goods yard was provided in 1882 which was located east of the station and a new signal box provided there to control the entrance to that yard. The earlier box was closed.

As London grew, developers starting acquiring land to build new properties and the demand at stations such as Manor Park increased. The GER realised that the two track main line was not enough to cope with the new suburban traffic and longer distance traffic and still provide a reliable service for the minor stations such as Manor Park. The answer was a programme of quadrupling (providing two additional tracks) along the route and this work took place in phases.

The GER was mostly restricted to the land it owned and work commenced c1890 in preparing for the quadrupling that was complete in 1894. The two new lines called the Through Lines, were provided south of the station and the goods yard (which was moved slightly southward) was connected to these lines. In the case of Manor Park some additional land to the north was purchased to accommodate what were now the Local Lines. A new signal box was provided east of the station and the 1882 box became an office. No platforms were provided on the Through Lines as these were used by longer distance services.

An additional track was also provided and opened on 4 April 1893 which ran between the west end of Manor Park and Forest Gate Junction. This was a reception road for the new goods yard located there.

Table 298 of the Bradshaw's timetable guide of July 1922 shows Manor Park to have a regular services of trains from Liverpool Street or Fenchurch Street. These trains terminated at Ilford, Chadwell Heath, Romford or Gidea Park or worked through to the Fairlop Loop. The station is referred to as Manor Park for Little Ilford in this publication.

In 1923, the GER amalgamated with other railways to form the London and North Eastern Railway (LNER).

=== London and North Eastern Railway (1923 - 1947) ===
During this period local stopping trains were generally hauled by LNER Class N7 locomotives on trains of corridor type carriage stock.

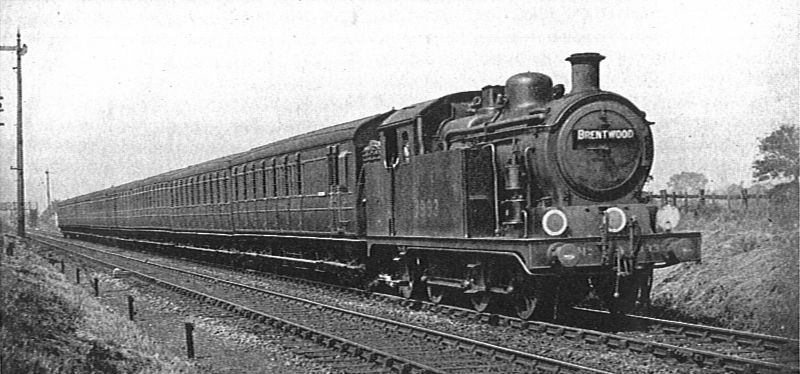
A typical LNER Suburban train, GER section of the LNER (CJ Allen, Steel Highway, 1928)

Plans were drawn up in the 1930s to electrify the suburban lines from Liverpool Street to Shenfield at 1,500 V DC and work was started on implementing this. However, the outbreak of the Second World War brought the project to a temporary halt and it was not until 1949 that the scheme was completed.

The station was damaged by bombing on 29 July 1944 during World War II.

As part of the electrification scheme a flyover was built just north of Manor Park. The flyover was designed to remove conflicting moves between Local Line and Through Line trains and meant that Maryland, Forest Gate and Manor Park stations required new platforms to be provided on the Through Lines as these three locations only had Local Line platforms after the 1893/4 quadrupling.

An additional fifth line known as the Up Passenger Avoiding line was added which allows up trains to switch from the up Through to Up Local lines. After the work was completed the Local Lines became the Electric Lines and the Through Lines became the Main Lines.

=== British Railways (1948 - 1994) ===
On 1 January 1948, following nationalisation of the railways, Manor Park became part of the British Railways Eastern Region. The electrification scheme and its associated works were finished and from February 1949 the Class 306 EMUs operated the service to steam timings but an accelerated all electric schedule was introduced in September 1949.

The signal box was closed as part of the electrification scheme on 14 August 1949 and a new box at Aldersbrook north of Manor Park took over working the area's signals.

The 1500 DC electrification system was converted to 25/6.35 KV AC operation between 4 and 6 November 1960.

In 1980 the first Class 315 EMUs were introduced to replace the Class 306s and were used on passenger trains serving Forest Gate.

The railway was sectorised in 1982 and Manor Park and the trains calling at it became part of the London and South-East sector. On 10 June 1986 this was rebranded to become Network South East which was responsible for working services up to privatisation.

=== The privatisation era (1994 - present day) ===
In April 1994 Railtrack became responsible for the maintenance of the infrastructure. Railtrack was succeeded by Network Rail in 2002.

Between privatisation on 1 April 1994 and 4 January 1997 the station was operated by a non-privatised business unit. Since then passenger services calling at the station have been operated by the following franchises:

- First Great Eastern 5 January 1997 – 31 March 2004
- National Express East Anglia 1 April 2004 – 4 February 2012
- Abellio Greater Anglia between 5 February 2012– 30 May 2015
- MTR TFL Rail between 31 May 2015 and 23 May 2022 after which the line was rebranded as the Elizabeth line who are the current operator.

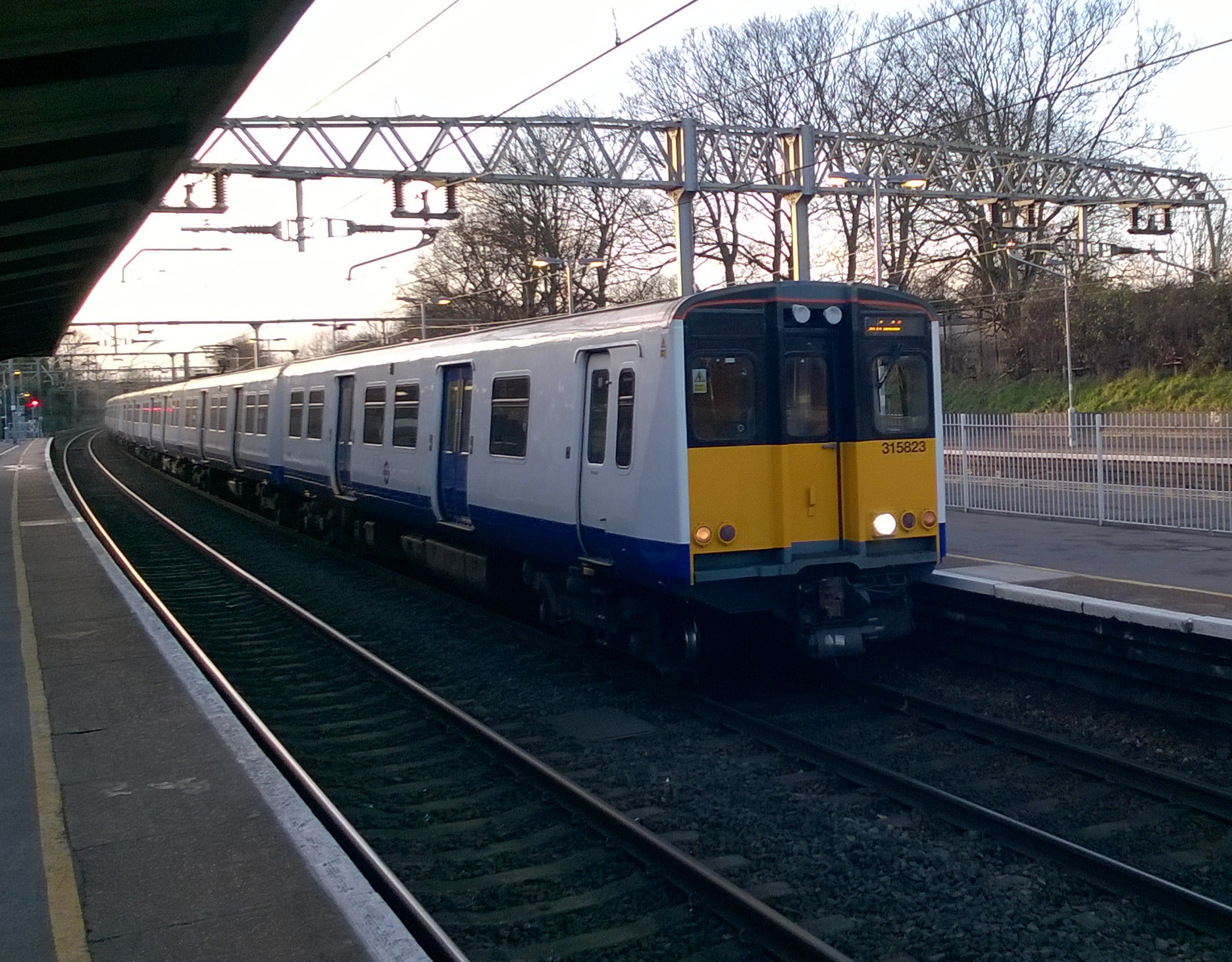
315823 at Manor Park station

In 2015, services run by Greater Anglia were intermediately rebranded to TfL Rail, as part of the development of the Elizabeth line. Significant upgrades were made to the station, including the installation of three lifts, a new bridge, staircases, and signage.

In June 2017, new Class 345 trains began entering service in preparation for completion of the Crossrail project. The Class 315 trains were finally taken out of service in 2022. Through services to central London, Heathrow Airport and Reading started running on the Crossrail-constructed Elizabeth line on 22 November 2022.

In early 2019 step free access was introduced to Manor Park station.

== Services ==
All services at Manor Park are operated by the Elizabeth line using Class 345 EMUs.

The typical Monday to Friday off-peak service in trains per hour is:

- 8 tph to London Paddington of which 2 continue to Heathrow Terminal 5
- 8 tph to Shenfield

During the peak hours, the station is served by a number of additional services between London Liverpool Street and Gidea Park. These services do not call at Whitechapel.

On Sundays, the service to and from Shenfield is reduced to 4 tph, with alternating services running only as far as Gidea Park.

Preceding station	Elizabeth line	Following station
Forest Gate towards Heathrow Terminal 5	Elizabeth line	Ilford towards Shenfield

== Future development ==
New Class 345 trains began entering service in 2017. Platforms 1 and 2 are only 168 metres (184 yd) and 185 metres (202 yd) long respectively and cannot physically be extended to accommodate the new trains, which will be over 200 metres (220 yd) in length, so selective door operation will be used. The freight loop around platform 1 is due to be removed and replaced by a new loop line further down-line, west of Chadwell Heath.

Due to the narrow platforms and the layout of the station, fitting lifts for disabled access is difficult, requiring the walkways to be rebuilt and closing parts of the station for several months. The station will receive new ticket machines and gates, an accessible toilet and new retail space.

== Connections ==
London Buses routes 101, 304, 474 and W19 serve the station.
