= Forest Gate railway station =

National Rail station in London, England

Forest Gate
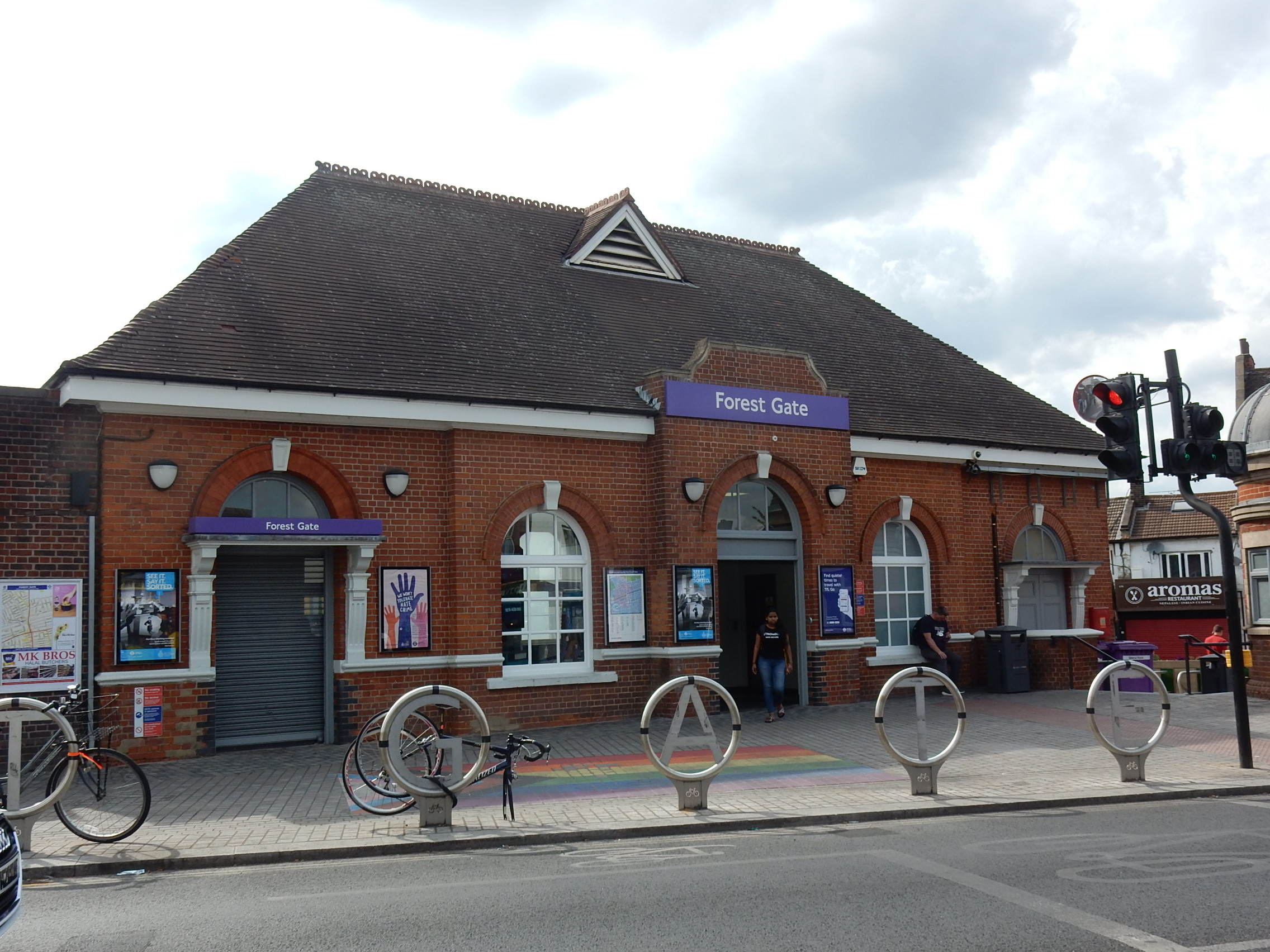
- Station entrance seen in August 2022
- Interactive map of Forest Gate

General information
- Location: Forest Gate
- Local authority: London Borough of Newham
- Managed by: Elizabeth line
- Owner: Network Rail
- Station code: FOG
- Number of platforms: 4
- Accessible: Yes
- Fare zone: 3
- OSI: Wanstead Park

National Rail annual entry and exit
- 2020–21: ▼1.424 million
- 2021–22: ▲2.675 million
- 2022–23: ▲4.884 million
- 2023–24: ▲7.177 million
- 2024–25: ▼5.836 million

Railway companies
- Original company: Eastern Counties Railway
- Pre-grouping: Great Eastern Railway
- Post-grouping: London and North Eastern Railway

Key dates
- 1840: Opened
- 1843: Closed
- 31 May 1846: Re-opened

Other information
- External links: Departures; Facilities
- Coordinates: 51.5494°N 0.0242°E

Forest Gate railway station is on the Great Eastern Main Line serving Forest Gate in the London Borough of Newham, east London. It is 5 miles 21 chains (8.5 km) down the line from London Liverpool Street and is situated between Maryland and Manor Park. Its three-letter station code is FOG and it is in London fare zone 3.

The station was opened in 1840 by the Eastern Counties Railway. It is managed and served by the Elizabeth line.

== History ==
=== Eastern Counties Railway (1840–1862) ===
Forest Gate station first opened in 1840 by the Eastern Counties Railway, a year after the line was built, but was closed in 1843, before re-opening on 31 May 1846 following pressure from local residents.

After re-opening the service was poor and local resident John Curwen observed "The trains were few and uncertain. Ten or twenty minutes belatement we thought nothing of. Sometimes trains did not come at all and I do not think there were more than seven or eight trains each way per day. On an average, about six people entered or left at Forest Gate".

The first station had two 350 feet platforms and an entrance in Forest Lane.

A junction was built east of Forest Gate station on 13 April 1854. which allowed the nascent London Tilbury and Southend Railway to operate trains to London via Stratford, Forest Gate station was not however served by these services. A signal box (or it may have been a platform) was established at the junction at this time.

By the 1860s the railways in East Anglia were in financial trouble, and most were leased to the ECR; they wished to amalgamate formally, but could not obtain government agreement for this until 1862, when the Great Eastern Railway was formed by amalgamation. Thus Forest Gate became a GER station in 1862.

=== Great Eastern Railway (1862–1922) ===
In the late 1860s with a growing population the station was proving inadequate and the station underwent some changes. In 1870 a new station building was provided on Woodgrange Road which crosses over the line at the east end of the station. Two years later, the two platforms were lengthened by 100 feet and a new bay platform for terminating services was provided on the down side.

A signal box was established at the station at this time (as no points had existed previously).

A secondary entrance was opened in Forest Lane in 1880 (further west than the original entrance). This was later extended with a small Tudor style extension. A footbridge linked this office to the platforms.

Further suburban growth led to the need to increase services on the Great Eastern Main Line and the proposal was to quadruple the line from Maryland Point to west of Romford for which powers were granted in an act of Parliament in 1882.

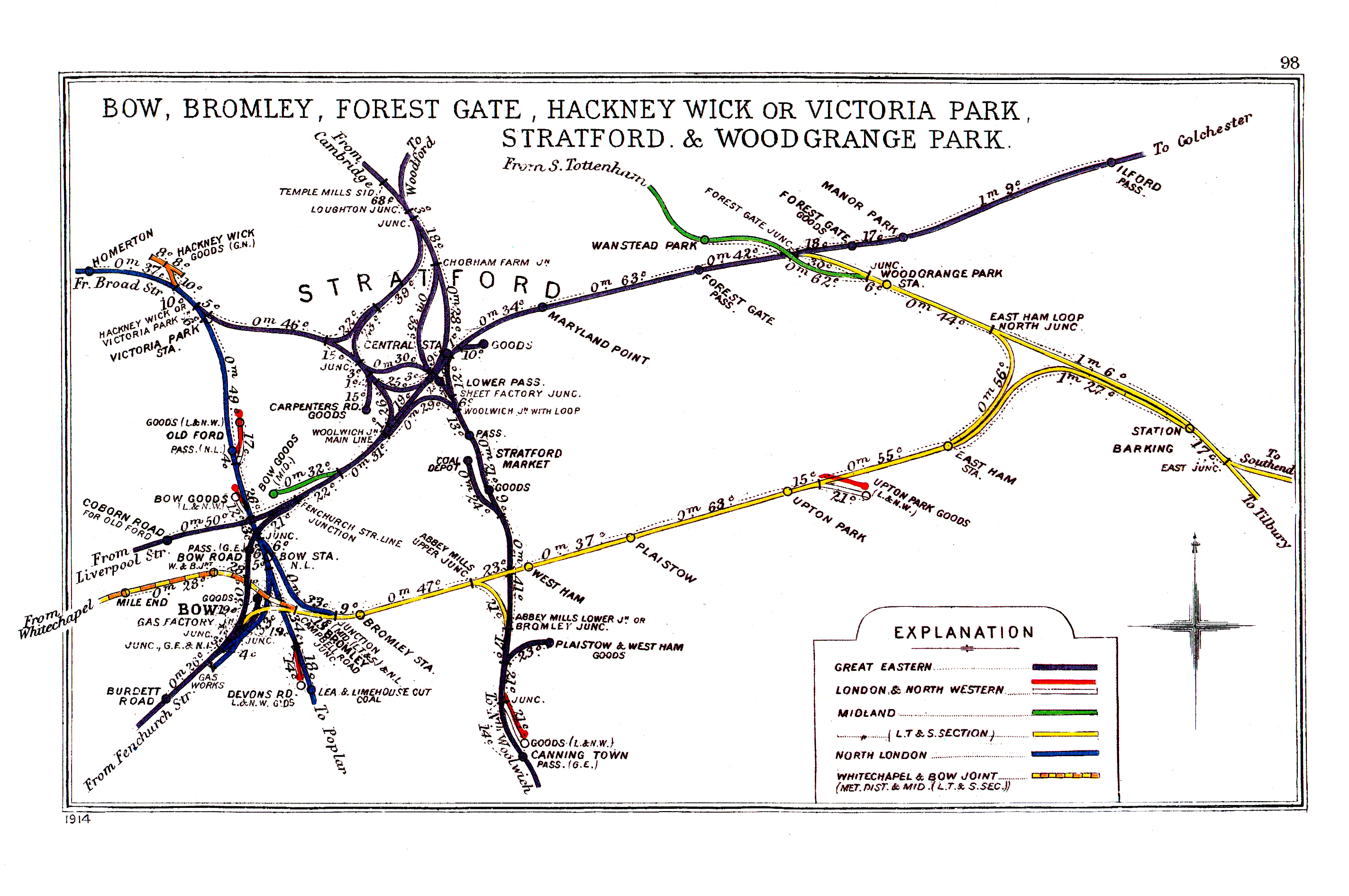
Railway Clearing House diagram - the Forest Gate area is top middle/right

By 1893 the line had been quadrupled either side of Forest Gate with temporary junctions either side of the station. The station was rebuilt with two new lines called the Through Lines being built south of the station. These did not have platforms and a wall separated the Up Local platform from the Down Through Line. Woodgrange Road was widened and another station building was provided. The bay platform was removed as part of the works as the Local Lines were moved slightly to the north to accommodate the changes and stay within the rail boundary. The 1870 signal box was replaced by a new structure at this time.

A small goods yard was established next to Forest Gate Junction on 4 April 1893 to compete with the Tottenham and Forest Gate Railway which was due to open in 1894. This railway crossed over the Great Eastern Railway at Forest Gate Junction and the Tottenham line opened to passengers on 9 July 1894.

In 1923, the GER amalgamated with other railways to form the London and North Eastern Railway (LNER).

=== London and North Eastern Railway (1923–1947) ===
During this period local stopping trains were generally hauled by LNER Class N7 locomotives on trains of corridor type carriage stock.

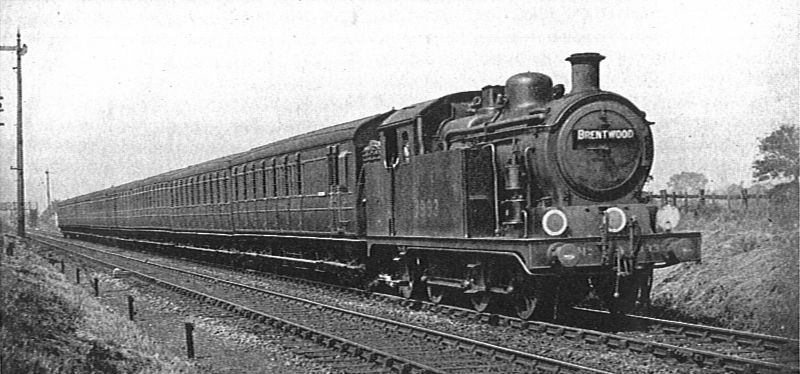
A typical LNER Suburban train, GER section of the LNER (CJ Allen, Steel Highway, 1928)

Plans were drawn up in the 1930s to electrify the suburban lines from Liverpool Street to Shenfield at 1,500 V DC and work was started on implementing this. However, the outbreak of the Second World War brought the project to a temporary halt and it was not until 1949 that the scheme was completed.

The Forest Lane entrance was taken out of service during 1940 as a wartime economy measure. Although it was planned to re-open this entrance after the 1946 remodelling and electrification, the entrance remained closed.

As part of the electrification scheme a flyover was built just south of Ilford. This was designed to remove conflicting moves between Local Line and Through Line trains and mean that south of that location Maryland, Forest Gate and Manor Park stations but meant new platforms had to be provided at these three locations as the only platforms were on the Local Lines. At Forest Gate this was done by digging out the embankment south of the station.

After the work was completed the Local Line became the Electric Line and the Through Line became the Main Line.

=== British Railways (1948–1994) ===
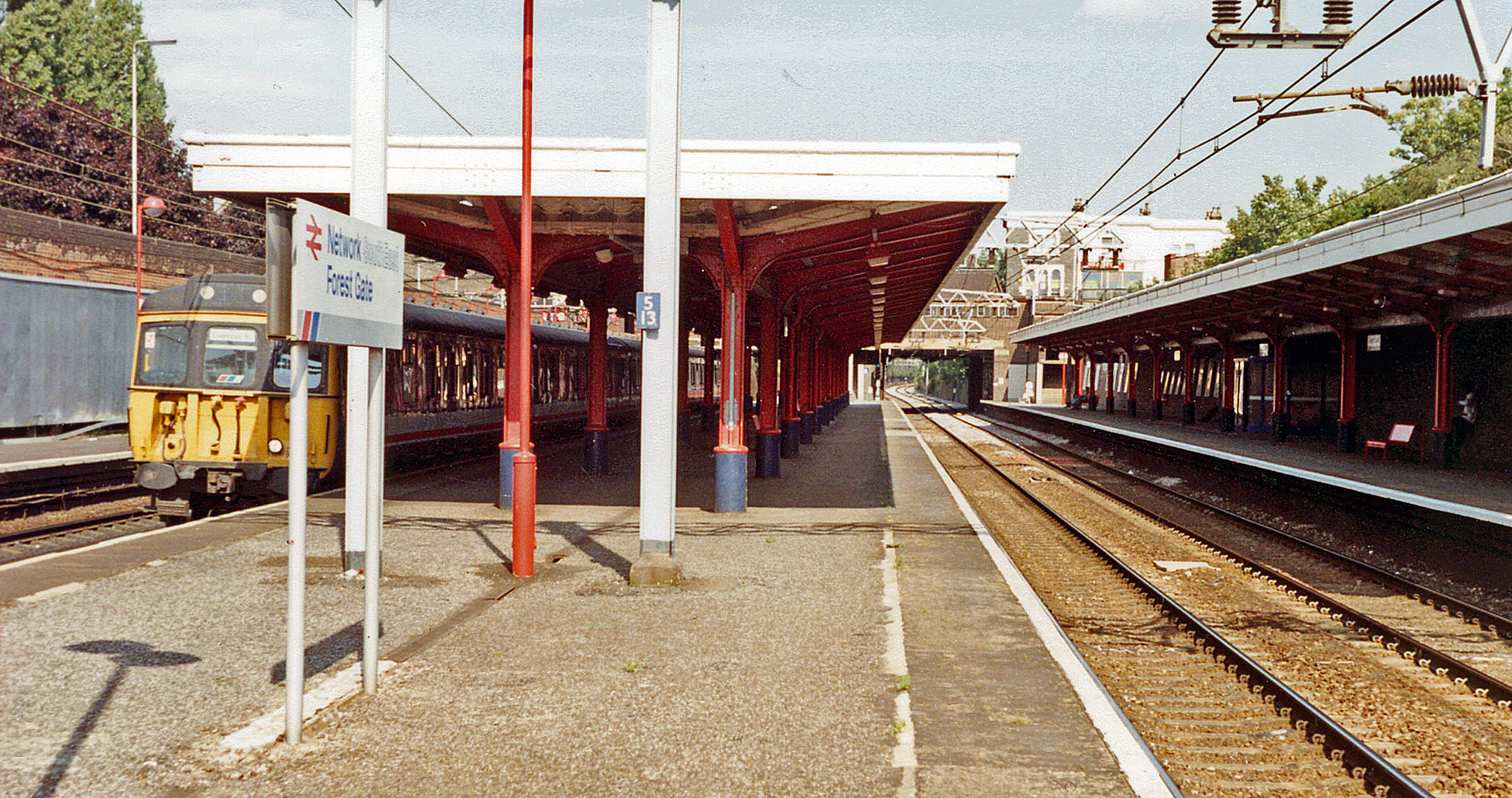
View of the station platforms in 1991

On 1 January 1948, following nationalisation of the railways, Forest Gate became part of the British Railways Eastern Region.

From February 1949 the Class 306 EMUs operated the service to steam timings but an accelerated all electric schedule was introduced in September 1949.

The 1500 DC electrification system was converted to 25/6.35 KV AC operation between 4 and 6 November 1960.

The goods depot was closed on 7 December 1970.

In 1980 the first Class 315 EMUs were introduced to replace the Class 306s. The 315s were used on passenger trains serving Forest Gate.

The railway was sectorised in 1982 and Forest Gate and the trains calling at it became part of the London and South-East sector. On 10 June 1986 this was rebranded to become Network South East which was responsible for working services up to privatisation.

=== The privatisation era (1994 - present day) ===
In April 1994 Railtrack became responsible for the maintenance of the infrastructure. Railtrack was succeeded by Network Rail in 2002.

Between privatisation on 1 April 1994 and 4 January 1997 the station was operated by a non-privatised business unit. Since then passenger services calling at the station have been operated by the following franchises:

- First Great Eastern 5 January 1997 – 31 March 2004
- National Express East Anglia 1 April 2004 – 4 February 2012
- Abellio Greater Anglia between 5 February 2012– 30 May 2015
- MTR TFL Rail between 31 May 2015 and 23 May 2022 after which the line was rebranded as the Elizabeth line who are the current operator.

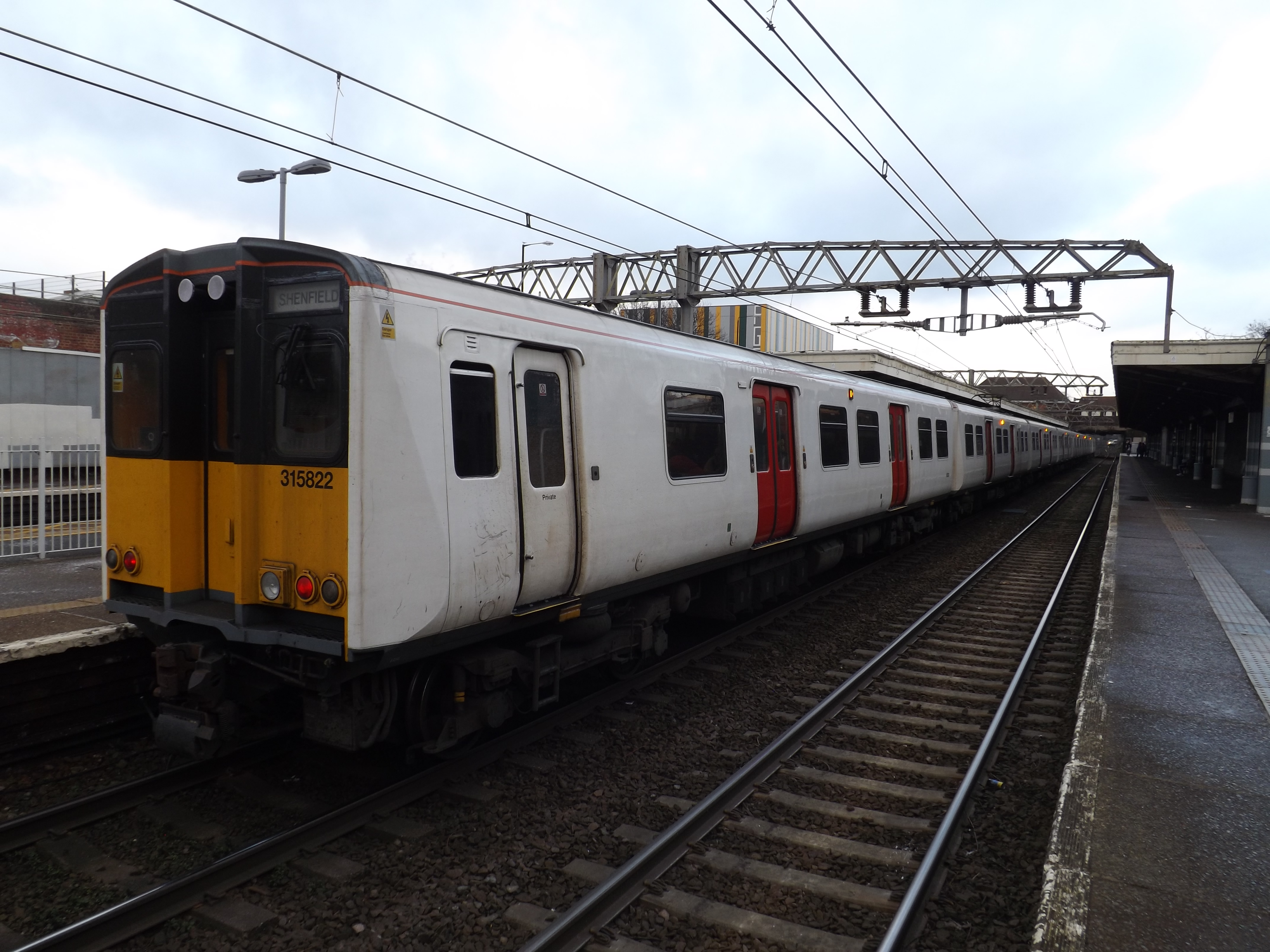
Class 315 at Forest Gate, February 2015

In June 2017, new Class 345 trains began entering service in preparation for the completion of the Crossrail project. The Class 315 trains were finally taken out of service in 2022. Through services to central London, Heathrow Airport and Reading started running on the Elizabeth line on 22 November 2022.

In early 2019 step free access was introduced to Forest Gate station.

=== Accidents and incidents ===
On 24 May 1953, at around 4 a.m., three members of train crew were injured in a collision between a freight train and a staff train that occurred east of Forest Gate station. A London-bound freight train that had started out at the Goodmayes goods yard was crossing from the electric line over to the main line when a staff train bound for the Gidea Park sidings passed a signal at danger and collided with the goods train at a speed of about 35 mph. A Ministry of Transport and Civil Aviation report blamed the driver of the Gidea Park train for his failure to "pay attention to signals".

External videos
- Footage of the aftermath of the 1953 train crash near Forest Gate – British Pathé

=== Crossrail improvements ===
New Class 345 trains were phased into service, and they are over 200 metres (220 yd) in length, necessitating the extension of Forest Gate's platforms. Other enhancements included three new lifts providing access to all platforms, improved lighting and signage, help points, and new ticket machines and gates within a refurbished ticket hall.

== Location ==
The station is 360 yards (330 m) from Wanstead Park station, and this interchange is suggested in the National Rail Timetable.

London Buses routes 58, 308 and 330 serve the station.

== Services ==
All services at Forest Gate are operated by the Elizabeth line using Class 345 EMUs.

The typical Monday to Friday off-peak service in trains per hour is:

- 8 tph to London Paddington of which 2 continue to Heathrow Terminal 5
- 8 tph to Shenfield

During the peak hours, the station is served by a number of additional services between London Liverpool Street and Gidea Park. These services do not call at Whitechapel.

On Sundays, the service to and from Shenfield is reduced to 4 tph, with alternating services running only as far as Gidea Park.

Preceding station	Elizabeth line	Following station
Maryland towards Heathrow Terminal 5	Elizabeth line	Manor Park towards Shenfield
