= East Ham tube station =

London Underground station

East Ham
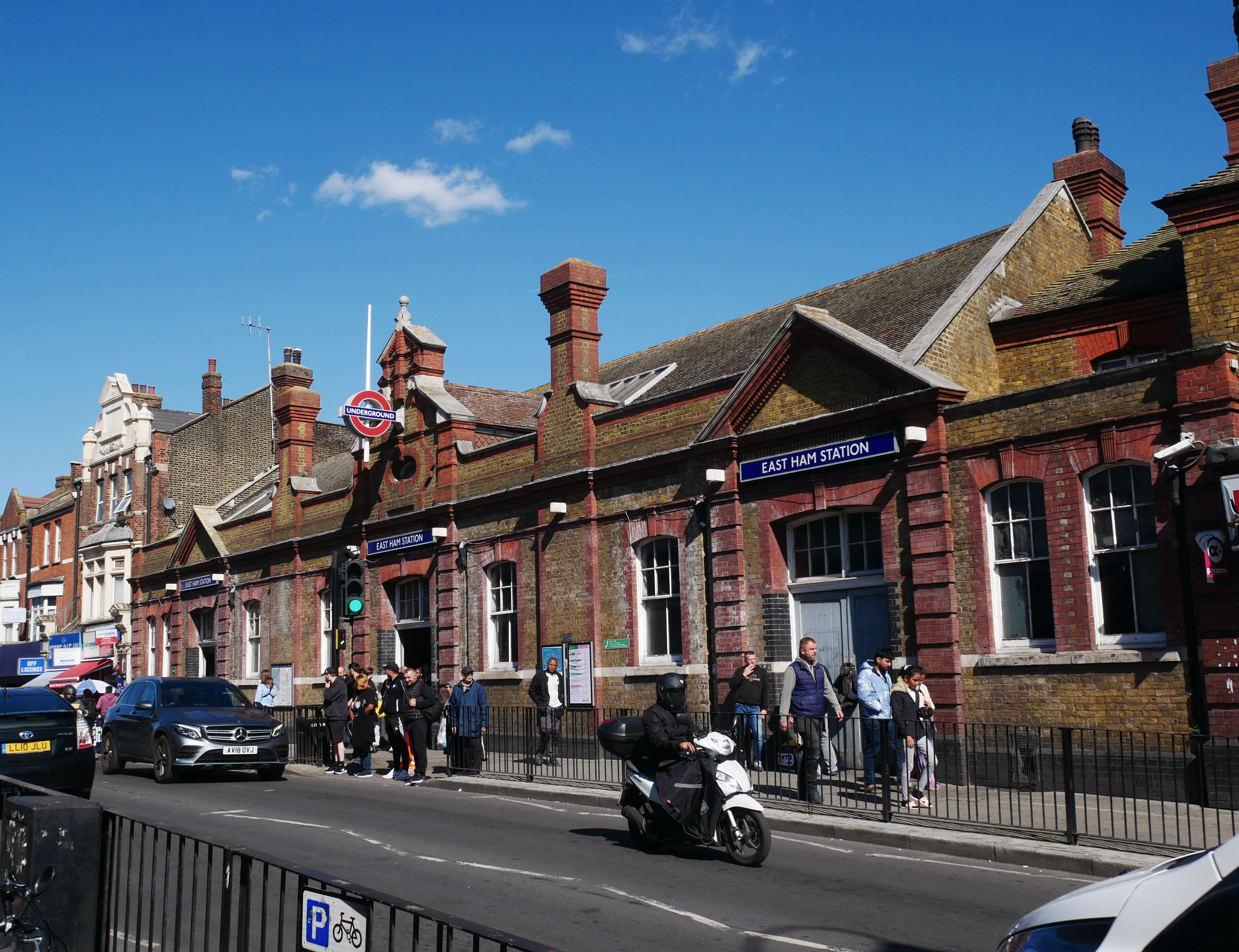
- Entrance to High Street North

General information
- Location: East Ham, Newham
- Coordinates: 51.539°N 0.0516°E
- Owner: Transport for London
- Manager: London Underground
- Platforms: 2

Construction
- Accessible: Yes

Other information
- Fare zone: 3 and 4
- Website: Official website

History
- Opened: 31 March 1858
- Original company: London, Tilbury and Southend Railway
- Pre-grouping: Midland Railway
- Post-grouping: London, Midland and Scottish Railway

Key dates
- 8 July 1894: East Ham–Kentish Town started
- 2 June 1902: District line started
- 30 March 1936: Metropolitan line started
- 1 January 1948: Ownership transferred to British Railways
- 15 September 1958: East Ham–Kentish Town withdrawn
- 14 June 1962: London–Southend withdrawn
- 1 January 1969: Ownership transferred to London Transport

Passengers

London Underground annual entry and exit
- 2021: ▼5.97 million
- 2022: ▲9.89 million
- 2023: ▲10.79 million
- 2024: ▼10.65 million
- 2025: ▲10.69 million

Listed Building – Grade II
- Official name: East Ham Underground Station
- Designated: 20 January 1999; 27 years ago
- Reference no.: 1245066
Location
- Location in Newham

East Ham (/ˈiːst ˈhæm/) is a London Underground station located on High Street North in the East Ham neighbourhood of the London Borough of Newham, East London. It is on the District and Hammersmith & City lines, between Upton Park to the west and Barking to the east. The station was opened by the London, Tilbury and Southend Railway on 31 March 1858 on a new more direct route from Fenchurch Street to Barking. It became an interchange station in 1894 when it was connected to the Tottenham and Forest Gate Railway. The large Edwardian station building was constructed to accommodate the electric District Railway services on an additional set of tracks opened in 1905. Metropolitan line service commenced in 1936. British Railways service to Kentish Town was withdrawn in 1958 and the Fenchurch Street–Southend service was withdrawn in 1962, leaving abandoned platforms. It is in London fare zones 3 and 4.

== History ==
The London, Tilbury and Southend Railway (LTSR) direct line between Bow and Barking was constructed east–west through the middle of the parish of East Ham with service starting on 31 March 1858. Prior to the building of the line, trains took a longer and more congested route via Stratford and Forest Gate. The new line initially had stations at Bromley, Plaistow and East Ham, with Upton Park added as the next station to the west of East Ham on 17 September 1877. A bay platform was added to the north of the station on 1 July 1894 that connected to the Tottenham and Forest Gate Railway. This was used to provide a frequent local service to St Pancras or Moorgate via a circuitous route through Kentish Town from 8 July 1894. East Ham was the interchange station for connections from this line to Tilbury and Southend. (Note: A limited number of express through trains avoiding East Ham commenced 1895.)

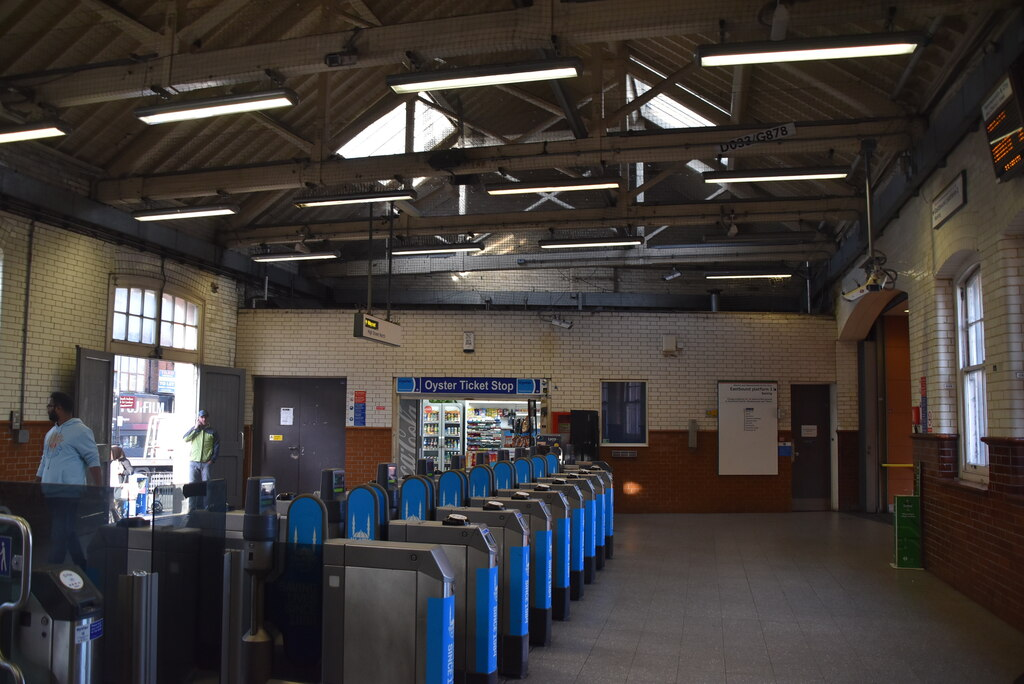
Ticket office interior from 1902 rebuild in 2022

The Whitechapel and Bow Railway opened on 2 June 1902 and allowed through services of the District Railway to operate to Upminster. Service began at East Ham on 2 June 1902. The District Railway was electrified over a second pair of tracks, and the service was cut back from Upminster to East Ham with the station then serving as the eastern terminus from 30 September 1905. The station, which had been described as very inadequate, was rebuilt to coincide with electrification. Passengers travelling further east transferred to steam trains, until 1 April 1908 when electrification was extended to Barking. (Note: Electric District service was extended to Upminster on 12 September 1932.) East Ham was a calling point for peak time "non-stop" trains that were introduced in December 1907. Service frequency was limited east of Whitechapel by the signalling system. Taking advantage of longer platforms on the LTSR section through East Ham, longer trains were run at peak times that split at Whitechapel into non-stop and stopping sections.

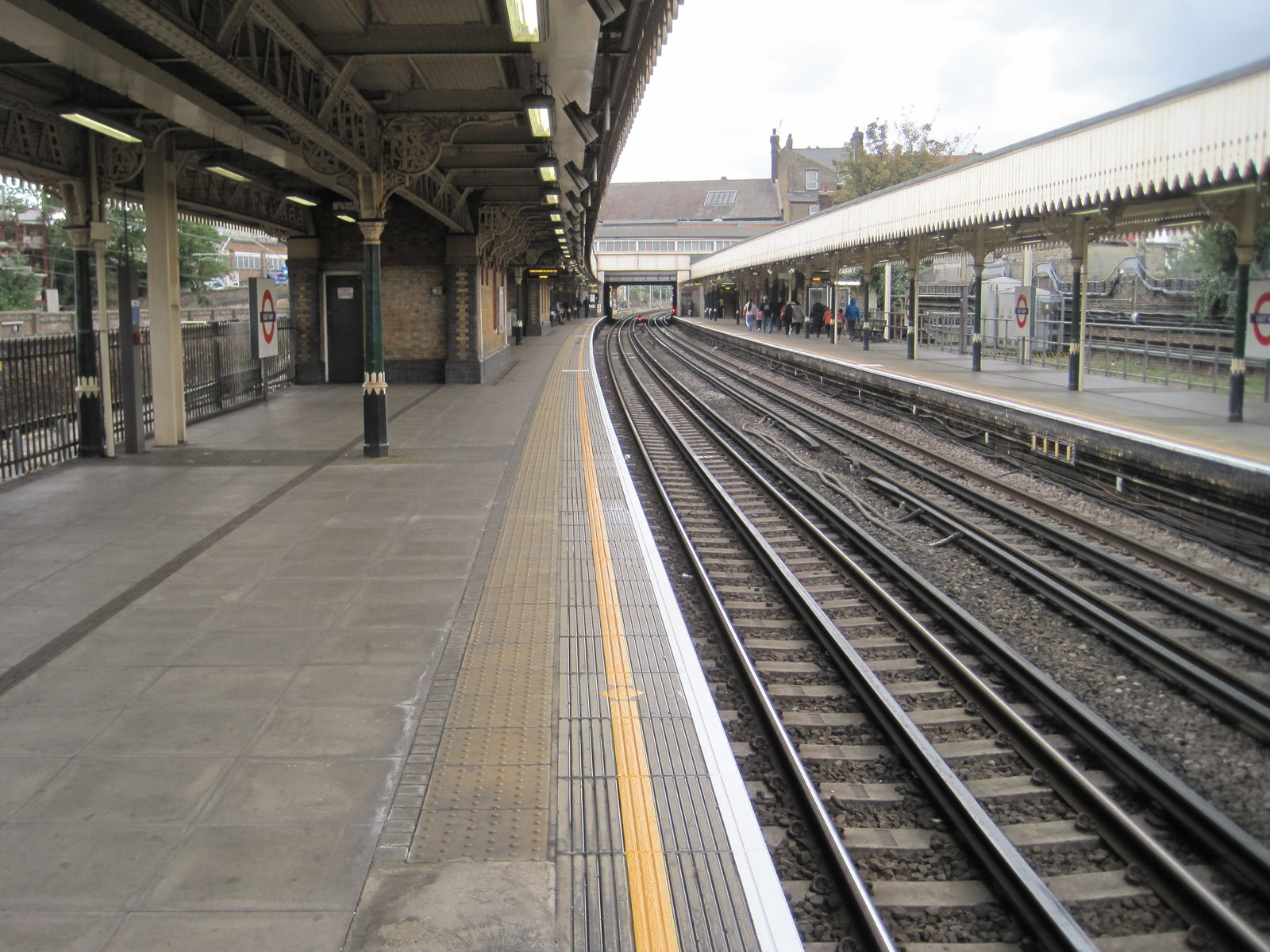
The District line platforms (eastbound to right) and note the 'LTSR' canopy support (close up detail)

The London, Tilbury and Southend Railway and Tottenham and Forest Gate Railway became part of the Midland Railway in 1912. (Note: The Tottenham and Forest Gate Railway was an existing joint venture between the London, Tilbury and Southend Railway and the Midland Railway.) With 3.9 million passengers in 1921 it was the busiest station on the London, Tilbury and Southend line. The Midland Railway was amalgamated into the London, Midland and Scottish Railway (LMS) on 1 January 1923. The District Railway was incorporated into London Transport in 1933, and became known as the District line. The eastern section of the District line was very overcrowded by the mid 1930s. In order to relieve this, the Metropolitan line service was extended to Barking. (Note: This was achieved by diverting Metropolitan line trains that had previously been routed onto the East London Line at Whitechapel.) East Ham was served by a single daily Metropolitan line train from Hammersmith from 30 March 1936. This was expanded from 4 May 1936 with an eight trains per hour service between Barking and Hammersmith at peak times. This was increased to ten trains per hour at East Ham from 8 May 1938. (Note: The two extra trains terminated at East Ham.) The Hammersmith service was swapped for longer Uxbridge trains from 17 July 1939, at eight trains per hour at peak times. This service was suspended on 6 October 1941 with Hammersmith trains again running to Barking.

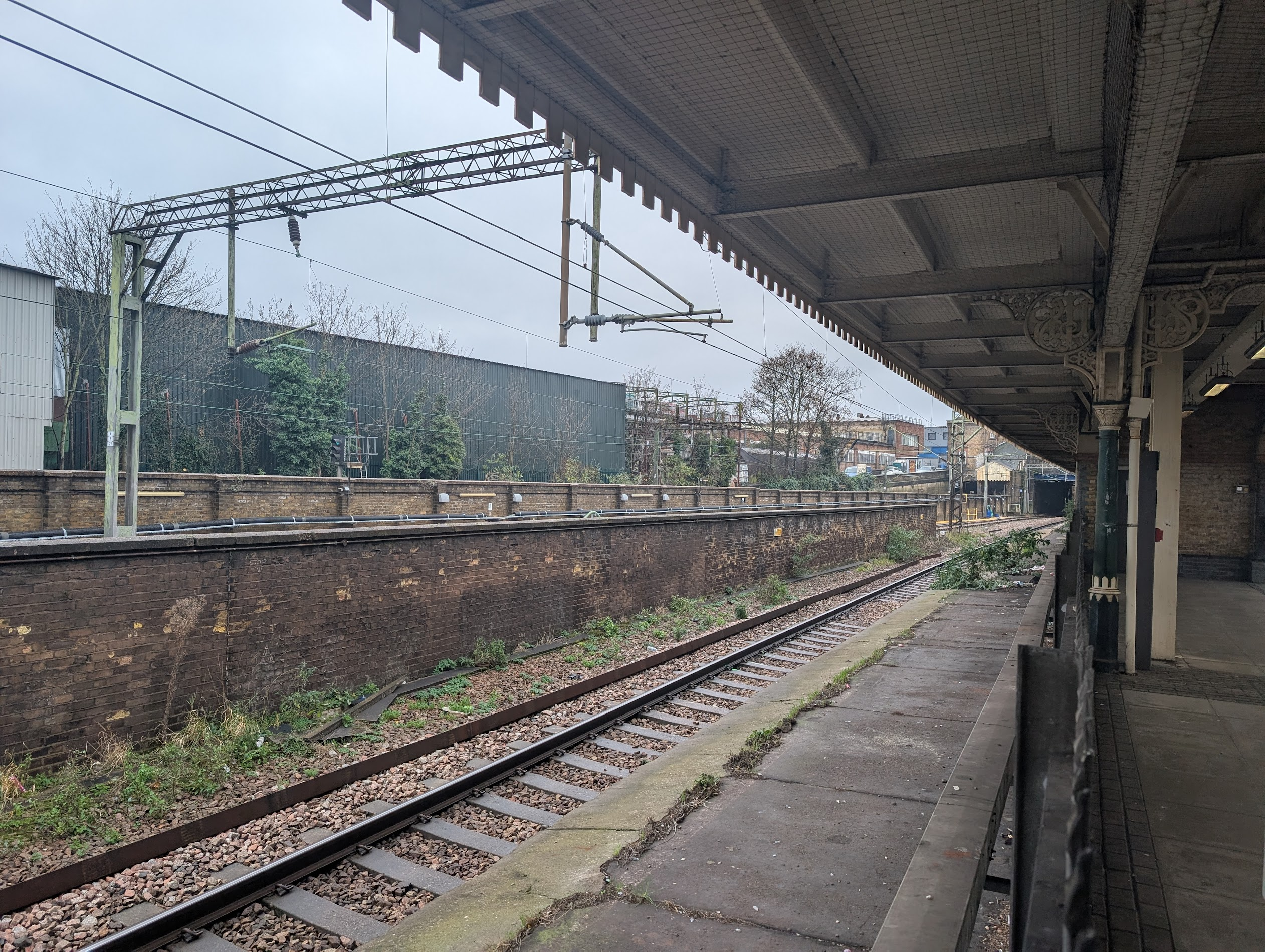
The disused down Southend platform forms an island with the westbound District line

After nationalisation of the railways in 1948, management of the station passed to British Railways. Service to Kentish Town was withdrawn from 15 September 1958 and the northern bay platform was taken out of use. To accommodate the new East Ham depot, the up through (Fenchurch Street) north-facing platform was demolished and a replacement built to the south. The new south-facing platform came into service on 31 November 1959. The Fenchurch Street–Southend services were withdrawn on 14 June 1962 with the introduction of full overhead line electric service. (Note: Limited summer services to Southend continued throughout the 1960s.) On 1 January 1969 ownership transferred to the London Underground. On 30 July 1990, the Hammersmith–Barking service of the Metropolitan line gained a separate identity as the Hammersmith & City line. Lifts providing step-free access to the platforms became operational on 2 August 2004. From 13 December 2009, off-peak Hammersmith & City line service was extended from Whitechapel to Barking with a daily all-day service at East Ham.

=== Incidents ===
On Sunday 10 October 1915, a passenger train travelling from Tilbury to Fenchurch Street was derailed, except for the engine, to the east of the station without causing serious injury. On the evening of 24 March 1924, one coach of a District Railway train derailed at the station. On 12 November 1959, a passenger train overran signals and was in a rear-end collision with another standing at the station. Thirteen people were injured.

== Design ==
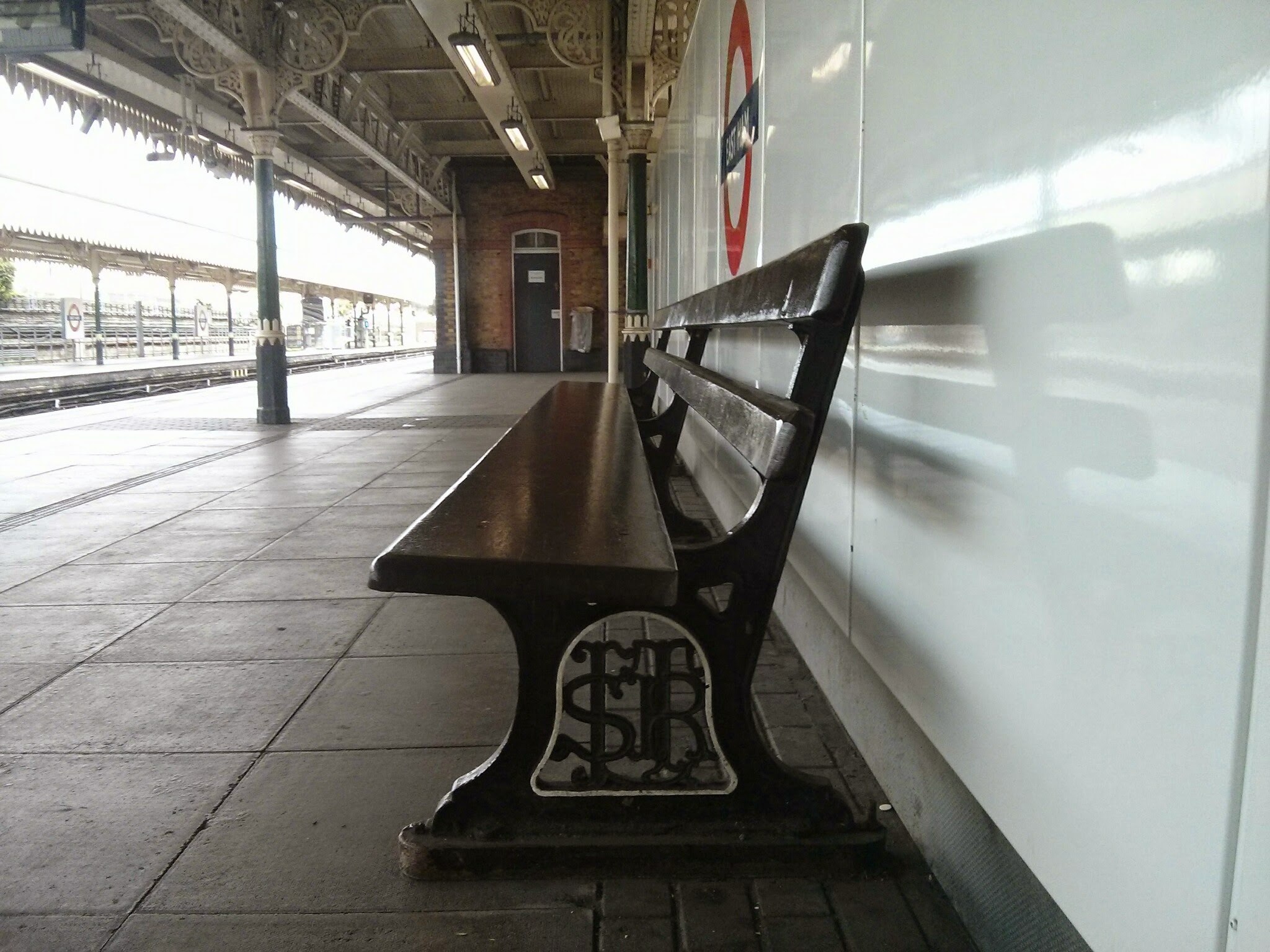
'LTSR' bench on the westbound platform (close up detail)

The station consists of two operational platforms on an east–west alignment. Platform 2, the northernmost, is for eastbound service. Platform 1 is for westbound service. The Edwardian brick station building that spans the tracks is from the 1902 rebuild for District Railway service. The ticket office interior is finished in glazed bricks. Elsewhere the station is finished in London stock and red brick. The station is Grade II listed. The disused platforms of the Fenchurch Street to Southend services are to the south of the operational platforms. There is a disused bay platform to the north of the station.

== Location ==
The station is located in the suburb of East Ham, on High Street North, in the London Borough of Newham. It is served by London Buses routes 101, 147, 238, 300, 304, 325, 376 and 474.

Barking is 2.29 kilometres (1.42 mi) to the east of the station and Upton Park is 1.4 kilometres (0.87 mi) to the west. It is 10.05 kilometres (6.24 mi) along the line from Tower Hill in Central London and 14.63 kilometres (9.09 mi) from the eastern terminus at Upminster. The station is 6 miles 18 chains (10.0 km) down the line from Fenchurch Street.

== Services ==
The station is managed by London Underground. It is in London fare zones 3 and 4. The typical off-peak service from the station is twelve District line trains per hour to Upminster with a further three trains to Barking. There are fifteen trains westbound to Earl's Court, of which six continue to Ealing Broadway, six continue to Richmond and three to Wimbledon. At peak periods the number of trains per hour increases. There are six Hammersmith & City line trains an hour to Barking and six to Hammersmith at all times.

Services towards central London operate from approximately 05:00 to 00:00 and services to Upminster operate from approximately 06:00 to 01:15. The journey time to Upminster is approximately 20 minutes, to Barking 3 minutes and to Tower Hill in central London 29 minutes. With 10.69 million entries and exits in 2025, it ranked 60th busiest London Underground station.

== Notes ==
Preceding station	London Underground	Following station
Upton Park towards Hammersmith	Hammersmith & City line	Barking Terminus
Upton Park towards Wimbledon, Richmond or Ealing Broadway	District line	Barking towards Upminster
Former services
Terminus	Eastern Region of British Railways; St Pancras–Barking/East Ham	Woodgrange Park
Upton Park	Eastern Region of British Railways; London, Tilbury and Southend	Barking
