= Woodgrange Park railway station =

Railway station in Greater London, England

Woodgrange Park
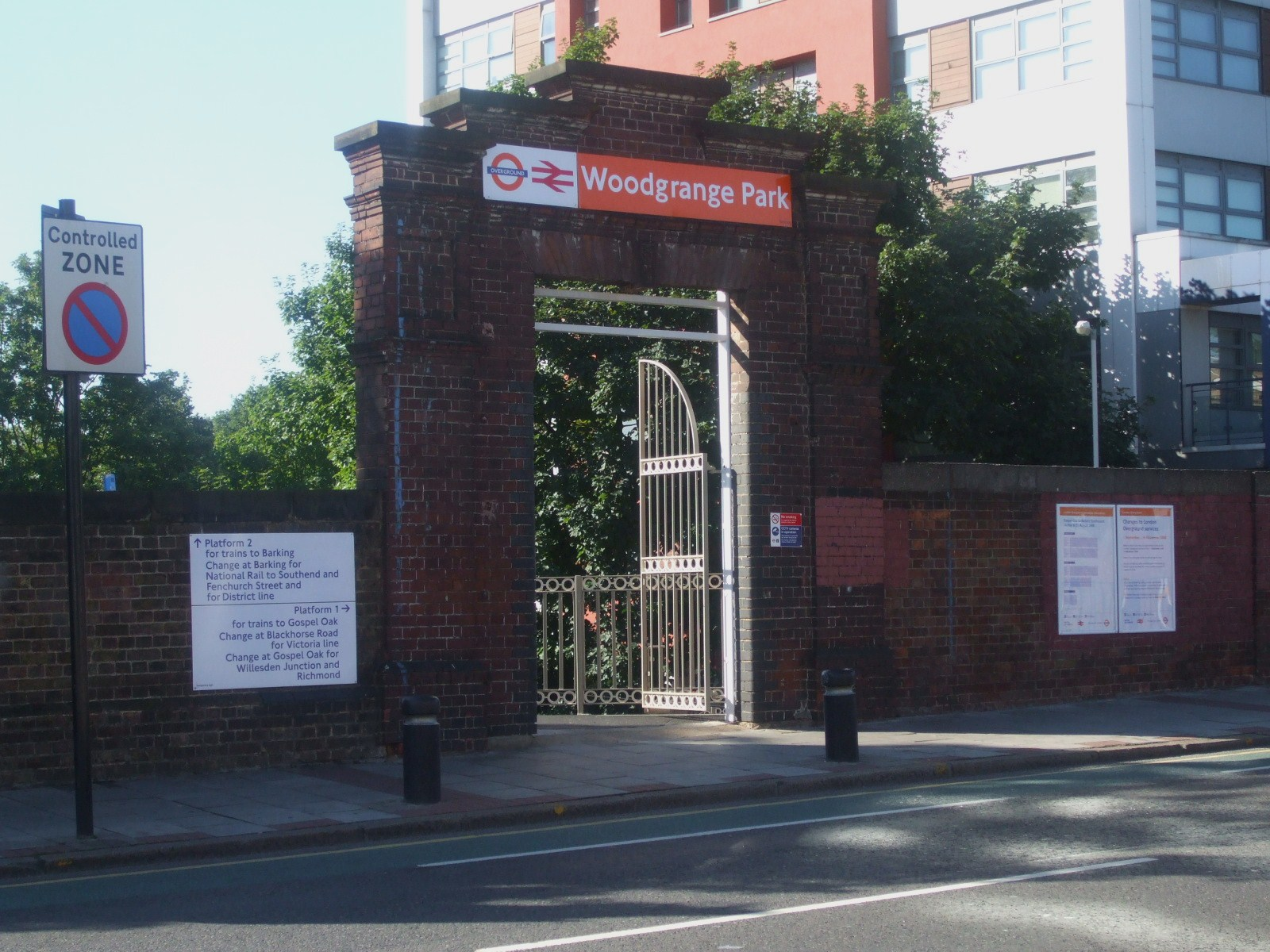
- Entrance to the eastbound platform

General information
- Location: Manor Park, Newham
- Coordinates: 51.5487°N 0.0454°E
- Owner: Network Rail
- Manager: London Overground
- Platforms: 2
- Connections: Out-of-station interchanges: Manor Park

Other information
- Station code: WGR
- Fare zone: 3 and 4
- Classification: Category E
- Website: Official website

History
- Opened: 9 July 1894
- Original company: London, Tilbury and Southend Railway
- Pre-grouping: Midland Railway
- Post-grouping: London, Midland and Scottish Railway

Passengers

National Rail annual entry and exit
- 2021–22: ▲0.732 million
- 2022–23: ▲0.776 million
- 2023–24: ▲0.890 million
- 2024–25: ▲0.939 million
- 2025–26: ▲0.972 million
Location
- Location in Newham

Woodgrange Park is a London Overground station on Romford Road in the Manor Park neighbourhood of the London Borough of Newham, East London. It is on the Suffragette line, between Wanstead Park and Barking stations. The station was opened on 9 July 1894 by the London, Tilbury and Southend Railway on a section of their line that had opened in 1854 and ceased to see regular service after 1858. It was initially served by trains to Bishopsgate, St Pancras, Moorgate, Barking and East Ham. The service pattern now runs regularly between Barking Riverside and Gospel Oak, 12 miles 1 chain (19.3 km) up the line. It is in London fare zone 3 and 4.

== History ==
On 13 April 1854, the first section of the London, Tilbury and Southend Railway (LTSR) from Forest Gate Junction on the Eastern Counties Railway (ECR) to Barking was opened through the site in the north of the parish of East Ham. The LTSR opened a more direct route from Bow to Barking, so its trains could avoid the congested route via Stratford, with service starting on 31 March 1858. The Forest Gate–Barking line was then used by four daily Bishopsgate to Barking services operated by the ECR. (Note: In 1875 the London terminus switched to Liverpool Street.) In 1862, the ECR became part of the Great Eastern Railway (GER). There had been requests from landowners for a station at Woodgrange Park, which had been declined by the LTSR because of difficulty serving the location after trains had been diverted onto the new line.

In July 1894, the Tottenham and Forest Gate Railway opened a new railway to Tottenham, beginning at a junction just north of the station site. This railway was a joint venture between the LTSR and the Midland Railway (MR). The LTSR built a station at Woodgrange Park, and a curve from their Forest Gate–Barking line to a short line running into a bay platform at East Ham. Woodgrange Park station opened on 9 July 1894 with two through platforms and a bay platform on the up side. (Note: It is unclear why this bay was provided and there is no evidence it was ever used. Kay suggests a potential Fenchurch Street–Woodgrange Park LTSR service might have been considered.) It was served by local trains from St Pancras or Moorgate to East Ham as well as eight daily GER Liverpool Street–Barking services. The goods yard, consisting of two sidings, opened on 1 January 1895. From 1895 Woodgrange Park was served by four daily St Pancras–Southend MR trains. The LTSR and the Tottenham and Forest Gate Railway became part of the MR in 1912. The goods yard became coal-only in 1916. During the First World War, Liverpool Street services were reduced to six in 1915, suspended on 1 May 1918, and were not restored. The MR was amalgamated with other railways to create the London, Midland and Scottish Railway (LMS) on 1 January 1923.

After nationalisation of the railways in 1948, management of the station passed to British Railways, initially as part of the London Midland Region and then the Eastern Region from 20 February 1949. Service to East Ham was withdrawn from 15 September 1958, with all trains running to Barking. (Note: All local trains ran to East Ham from 27 October 1957 to 14 September 1958.) The coal yard closed on 7 December 1964. Passenger traffic reached its lowest level in the 1970s. The western terminus became Gospel Oak on 5 January 1981 and it became known as the Gospel Oak to Barking line. The station was transferred to Transport for London (TfL) management in November 2007 and the line become part of the London Overground network. Electric Class 710 trains began serving the station in 2019. In February 2024, it was announced that the service would be named the Suffragette line. The new name took effect in November 2024.

== Design ==
Nothing remains of the original street level building that was located to the west of the platforms and is now the forecourt of a residential building. The street-facing canopy design was also used at Dagenham Dock and Leigh. The building was demolished in the early 1960s and the smaller replacement was also demolished at an unknown date. The platform canopies had the distinctive 'LTSR' support brackets that were first used in 1894. The platform buildings and canopies were removed in 1976. The 1894 covered footbridge was replaced by individual staircases from the platforms to the street in 1994. The entrance arch to the eastbound platform is the surviving remains of an additional exit directly from the footbridge that was brought back into use in 1994. The similar construction at the entrance to the westbound platform is a modern pastiche. The platform buildings which house ticket barriers and shelters are from the 2010s.

== Location ==
The station is on Romford Road, in the London Borough of Newham. To the west of the station is Woodgrange Park Cemetery and the Woodgrange housing estate. "Woodgrange" is an old name for the area, referring to its historic function as a monastic grange for Stratford Langthorne Abbey. Barking is 1.75 miles (2.82 km) to the southeast of the station and Wanstead Park is 0.8 miles (1.3 km) to the west-northwest. Manor Park station on the Elizabeth line is nearby and an out of station interchange is permitted. The Tube Map shows a permitted interchange between Forest Gate and Wanstead Park instead. London Buses routes 25, 86, 425 and night routes N25 and N86 serve the station.

== Services ==
The station is managed by London Overground. It is in London fare zones 3 and 4. The typical off-peak service from the station is four Suffragette line trains per hour eastbound to Barking Riverside and four westbound to Gospel Oak.

== Notes ==
Preceding station	London Overground	Following station
Wanstead Park towards Gospel Oak	Suffragette line Gospel Oak to Barking line	Barking towards Barking Riverside
	Disused railways	
Wanstead Park	Eastern Region of British Railways; St Pancras–Barking/East Ham	East Ham
