= Blackhorse Road station =

London Overground and London Underground station

Blackhorse Road
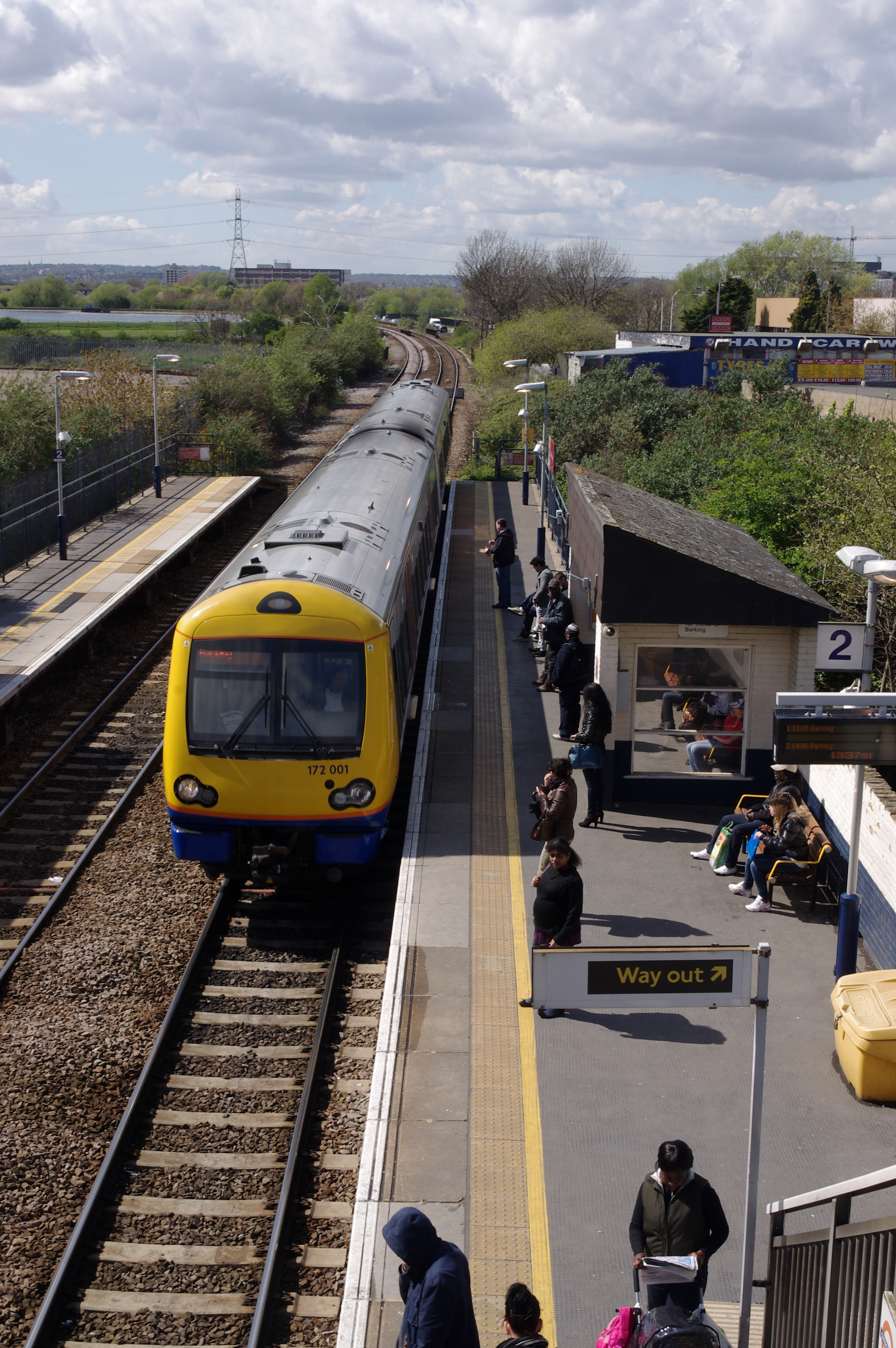
- Class 172 Turbostar at the station in 2012
- Interactive map of Blackhorse Road

General information
- Location: Walthamstow
- Local authority: London Borough of Waltham Forest
- Managed by: London Underground
- Owners: London Underground; Network Rail
- Station code: BHO
- DfT category: E
- Number of platforms: 4
- Accessible: Yes (London Overground only)
- Fare zone: 3

London Underground annual entry and exit
- 2020: ▼6.16 million
- 2021: ▼4.99 million
- 2022: ▲8.51 million
- 2023: ▲8.98 million
- 2024: ▲9.47 million

National Rail annual entry and exit
- 2020–21: ▼0.972 million
- 2021–22: ▲1.753 million
- 2022–23: ▲1.932 million
- 2023–24: ▲2.281 million
- 2024–25: ▲2.694 million

Key dates
- 9 July 1894: National Rail opened
- 1 September 1968: Victoria line started
- 14 December 1981: BR station resited

Other information
- External links: TfL station info page; Departures; Facilities
- Coordinates: 51.586944°N 0.041389°W

Blackhorse Road is an interchange station, located at the junction of Blackhorse Road/Blackhorse Lane with Forest Road in Walthamstow, London for London Underground and London Overground services.

It is on the Victoria line of the London Underground and is the penultimate station on the eastern end of that line. Above ground, the station is on the Suffragette line of the London Overground, 7 miles 21 chains (11.7 km) from St Pancras (measured via Kentish Town and Mortimer Street Junction).

It is in London fare zone 3.

Ticket barriers control access to all platforms. Passengers using Oyster cards are required to tap on a yellow Oyster card reader at ticket gates when entering and leaving the station and - to be charged a lower fare - suggested to also tap on a pink Oyster card reader if transferring between the two lines.

== History ==
The station was opened by the Tottenham and Forest Gate Railway on 9 July 1894, and was originally situated east of Blackhorse Road. Its opening changed the local area from a gentrified London suburb to industrial, with several works and units opening around Ferry Lane to the northwest.

The Victoria line station opened on 1 September 1968, across the road from the mainline station. It was planned as a simple two-platform station, and was the only station on the line with any new structures above ground level. The surface line station was re-sited by British Rail on 14 December 1981, to provide better interchange with the Underground station.

== Design ==
=== Structure ===
The station contains two underground platforms for the Victoria line and two for the London Overground. Owing to budget restraints at the time of construction, the Underground station, like many stations on the Victoria line, was never completely finished to the standard of other lines. White ceiling panels were never fixed to the ceilings above the platforms; instead the steel tunnel segments were painted black and used to support the fixtures and fittings. This has had a detrimental effect on the lighting levels.

=== Artwork ===
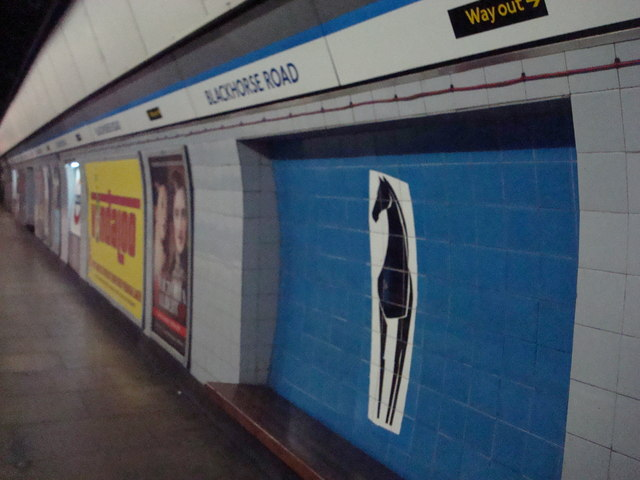
The black horse tile motif at the tube station.

There are two distinct works of art at the station, both depicting black horses, in reference to the station's name. One is in the form of a tile motif depicting a black horse on a white cameo against a light blue background, identical to the Victoria line's colour. It was designed by Hans Unger, who also did the tile motif at Seven Sisters tube station. The other is a mural of a black horse outside the station's entrance, by David McFall.

== Location ==
It is the closest railway station to Walthamstow Wetlands.

London Bus routes 123, 158, 230, W11 and night route N73 serve the station.

== Services ==
During peak periods, trains run approximately every two minutes on the Victoria line (up to 33 trains per hour) in both directions.

The typical off-peak service for the Suffragette line of the London Overground in trains per hour (tph) is:

- 4 tph westbound to Gospel Oak
- 4 tph eastbound to Barking Riverside

From June 2016 until February 2017, services on the route were suspended whilst it was electrified; this project involved lowering track in several places, rebuilding bridges and lengthening platforms as well as installing overhead wires. A replacement bus service was in operation for the duration of the closure period.

Preceding station	London Underground	Following station
Tottenham Hale towards Brixton	Victoria line	Walthamstow Central Terminus
Preceding station	London Overground	Following station
South Tottenham towards Gospel Oak	Suffragette line Gospel Oak to Barking line	Walthamstow Queen's Road towards Barking Riverside
