= Max Blaney =

Recipient of the George Cross

Michael Floud Blaney
- Born: 14 November 1910; Newry, Ireland
- Died: 13 December 1940 (aged 30); Manor Park, Essex, England
- Burial place: Newry Old Chapel Roman Catholic Cemetery, Newry
- Military career
- Allegiance: United Kingdom
- Branch: British Army
- Service years: 1939–1940
- Rank: Captain
- Nickname: Max
- Service number: 119978
- Unit: Corps of Royal Engineers
- Conflicts: Second World War: Home Front; The Blitz †
- Awards: George Cross

Michael Floud Blaney, GC (14 November 1910 – 13 December 1940), known as Max Blaney, was posthumously awarded the George Cross for defusing enemy bombs during the Blitz in 1940.

== Second World War ==
Blaney, a member of the Corps of Royal Engineers, dismantled several bombs on 18 September, 20 October and 13 December 1940. During the last incident he was killed, aged 30, when the bomb he was defusing exploded in Manor Park, Essex.

== George Cross citation ==
Notice of Blaney's George Cross appeared in the London Gazette on 15 April 1941:

The King has been graciously pleased to approve the award of the George Cross, for most conspicuous gallantry in carrying out hazardous work in a very brave manner.

In December 2013 an Ulster History Circle blue plaque was unveiled in his memory in Newry.
