= Manor Park, London =

Area in East London, England

Coordinates: 51.55033°N 0.056219°E

Manor Park
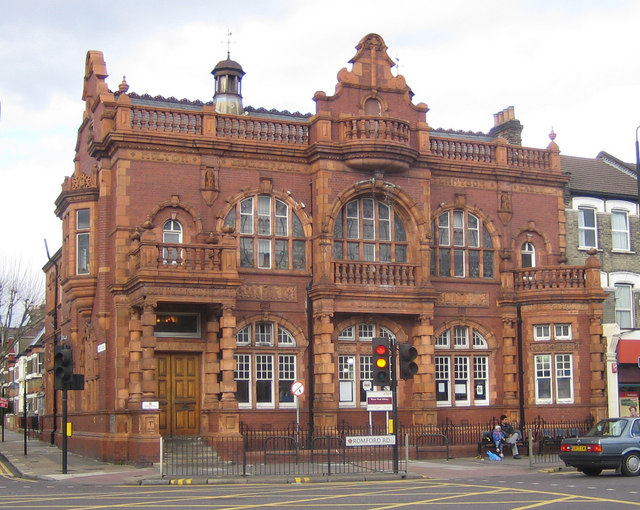
- Manor Park Library

- Location within Greater London
- Population: 15,318 (2011 Census Ward)
- OS grid reference: TQ425855
- London borough: Newham
- Ceremonial county: Greater London
- Region: London
- Country: England
- Sovereign state: United Kingdom
- Post town: LONDON
- Postcode district: E12
- Dialling code: 020
- Police: Metropolitan
- Fire: London
- Ambulance: London
- UK Parliament: East Ham
- London Assembly: City and East

Manor Park is a residential area of the London Borough of Newham in east London, England. The area is bordered by Ilford to the east, Forest Gate to the west, Wanstead to the north, and East Ham to the south.

It was originally a part of the hundred of Becontree, and part of the historic county of Essex. Since 1965, Manor Park has been part of the London Borough of Newham, a local government district of Greater London. The area forms the majority of the London E12 postcode district.

== History ==
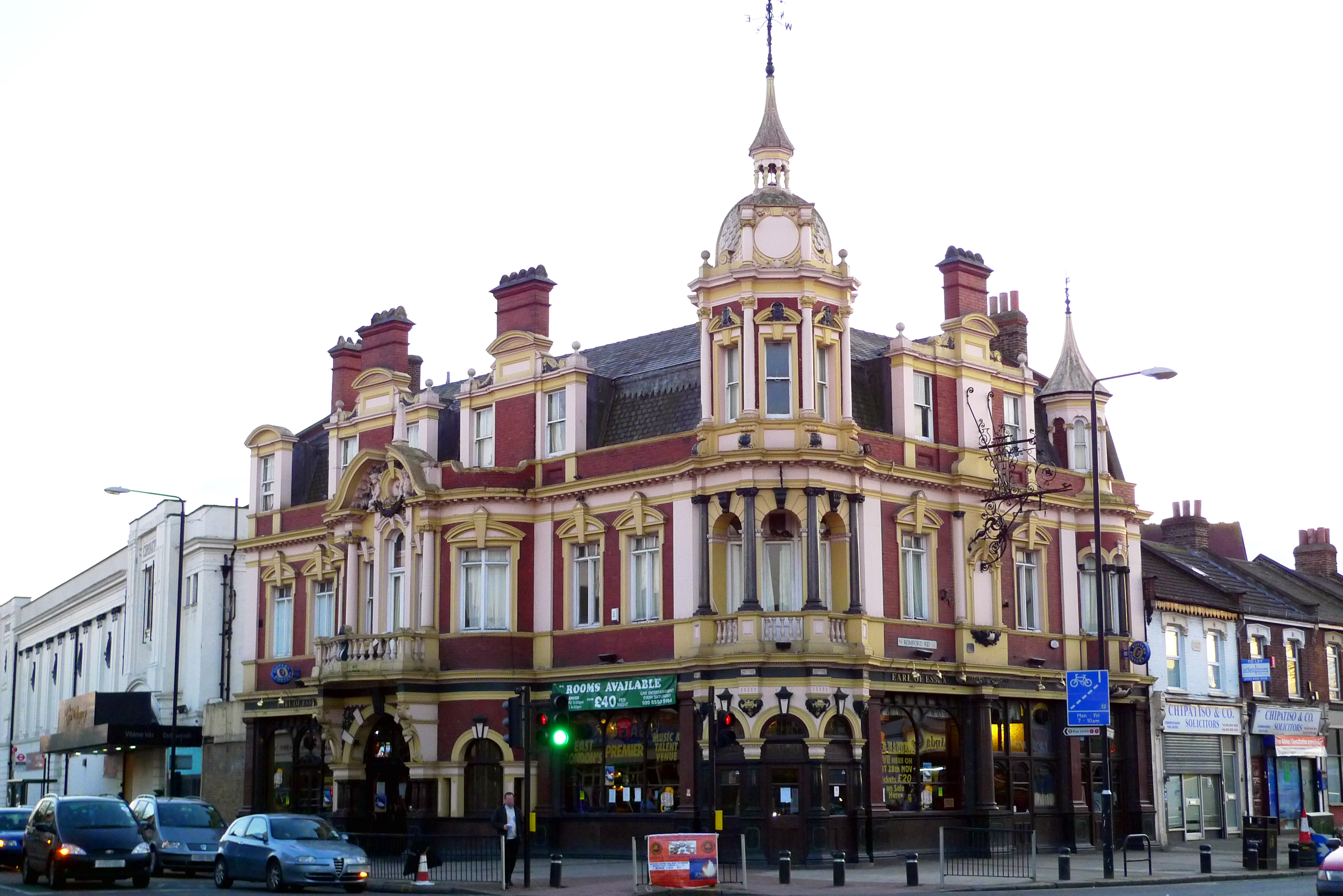
The Earl of Essex pub

Manor Park is centred on one of the Roman roads developed out from Londinium between 43CE and 68CE, leaving the north-east corner of the capital Londinium, through Old Ford, Stratford, Forest Gate, Ilford and Romford to Camulodunum (Colchester), being recorded by the Romans as Iter IX in the Antonine Itinerary. Antiquarian Ivan Margary labelled the Roman road as RR3, and it became known as The Great Road.

The original route of Margary's RR3 (The Great Road) has been obscured over time: 'The crossing place at Iceland Wharf, Old Ford, has been well established and from it the eastern road ran north-eastward through Stratford, though its course through Forest Gate and Manor Park appears to be slightly distorted from the true line.'

Apart from four pairs of small semi-detached agricultural workers' houses, known as Ebor Cottages, the area to the north of Romford Road was ripe for development; the owners, the Gurney family, sold 110 acres of market garden land to Thomas Corbett in 1877. The Corbett family built the Woodgrange and Durham Road estates between 1877 and 1892. The Forest Gate Weekly recorded the attractiveness of the estate, it having "the three great essentials to the average city man of easy access, reasonable rentals and a first class local market."

== Geography ==
Manor Park was part of the County Borough of East Ham, Essex until 1965, when the Greater London county was formed. The area postcode is E12 and it is part of the East London post town.

=== Durham Road Conservation Zone ===
The Durham Road Conservation Zone is a small late-Victorian development, built close to Manor Park station. It was designated a Conservation Area in 1984 to retain its original charm and character. Additional planning controls were introduced in 1998 to protect and enhance its special character. The area, popularly referred to as Manor Park Village, was originally developed in the 1880s on farmland that formed part of the Gurney estate. It was built by one builder to an overall plan, with a limited range of house styles giving the area a distinctive character and unity. The developers, the Corbett family, built several suburban estates including the adjacent Woodgrange Estate in Forest Gate.

A direct line of Margary's identified ancient Roman Road RR3 from the Old Ford crossing, to the ancient river crossing at Ilford, would run east through a section of the estate, north-east to the area of Manor Park station.

== Governance ==
Manor Park is part of the East Ham constituency for elections to the House of Commons of the United Kingdom.

Manor Park is part of the Manor Park ward for elections to Newham London Borough Council.

== Transport ==
Romford Road, a stretch of the A118, runs for much of its length in both Newham and Redbridge, providing the main road route through Manor Park and linking the eastern districts with the city of London.

Manor Park railway station is a stop on the main public transport link, the Elizabeth line. Trains between Shenfield, Liverpool Street, Paddington and Heathrow Terminal 5 run every ten minutes. Nearby Woodgrange Park station is on the Barking to Gospel Oak line, popularly referred to as the Goblin, which is part of the London Overground network. Both stations are in Zone 3.

== Education ==
Manor Park is home to many primary schools, including Salisbury primary school, which opened in 1893; it is accessible by the main Romford Road or High Street North.

== Sport ==
Manor Park also has an amateur football team called A.C. Manor Park, who play in the AFL.

== In popular culture ==
Little Ilford Park was made famous in a song called Itchycoo Park by the Small Faces, whose lead singer Steve Marriott lived in the area.

== Notable people ==
- Michael Blaney, World War II bomb disposal officer from Newry; died when a bomb he was trying to defuse exploded in Manor Park; Blaney Crescent in East Ham is named after him; awarded the George Cross
- Clive Burr, drummer with Iron Maiden, grew up in Manor Park
- Kathleen Byron, actress, born in Manor Park in 1921
- Jack Cornwell, posthumous teenage recipient of the Victoria Cross in 1916, grew up in Manor Park and is buried at the Manor Park Cemetery
- Greer Garson, Oscar-winning film actress, born in Manor Park in 1904
- Bobby George, darts player and pundit. Born in Manor Park, 1945.
- Jimmy Greaves, footballer, born Manor Park in 1940.
- Stanley Holloway, actor, born at 25 Albany Road (at which there is an English Heritage blue plaque erected in 2009)
- Steve Marriott, lead singer and guitarist of Small Faces and Humble Pie, was born in Manor Park
- Kele Okereke, lead singer of Bloc Party, is from Manor Park
- Matt Taylor, space scientist, who landed the Rosetta spacecraft on a comet. Born in Manor Park, 1973.
