= Tottenham and Forest Gate Railway =

Railway line in London, England

Overview
- Status: Part of Gospel Oak to Barking line
- Owner: London, Tilbury and Southend Railway and Midland Railway and successors
- Locale: London, England
- Stations: 6

Service
- Type: Suburban rail and goods

History
- Opened: 9 July 1894

Technical
- Number of tracks: 2
- Track gauge: 1,435 mm (4 ft 8 1/2 in) standard gauge

The Tottenham and Forest Gate Railway was a railway line in north London, that is now entirely integrated into the London Overground network. Two sections of railway were authorised in 1890 and built as a joint venture between the Midland Railway and the London, Tilbury and Southend Railway. The line and six new stations opened to passengers on 9 July 1894. It provided passenger services to parts of Walthamstow poorly served by existing lines and gave both railway companies access to new territory. It connected with other railways at either end, including the Tottenham and Hampstead Junction Railway, to provide through services to Moorgate, St Pancras, East Ham, Tilbury and Southend. By 1962, the only passenger service was a local train between Barking and Kentish Town. The railway is now part of the Gospel Oak to Barking line and it carries the Suffragette line service of the London Overground.

== History ==
The Tottenham and Forest Gate Railway (TFGR) was promoted by Courtenay Warner, a landowner in Walthamstow who was acting as a property developer. By 1889, suburban housebuilding was underway, but some parts were too far from the Great Eastern Railway (GER) lines to be served by rail. Warner desired a new line through these areas to open them up for development. It was proposed to connect the London, Tilbury and Southend Railway (LTSR) at Woodgrange Park with the Tottenham and Hampstead Junction Railway (THJR) at South Tottenham. The LTSR were immediately supportive of the scheme. Proposed services included from St Pancras/Moorgate to Southend and a horseshoe route from St Pancras to Fenchchurch Street.

Tottenham and Forest Gate Railway Act 1890
- Act of Parliament
- Parliament of the United Kingdom
- Long title: An Act to authorise the construction of Railways between Tottenham and Forest Gate and for other purposes.
- Citation: 53 & 54 Vict. c. clviii

Dates
- Royal assent: 4 August 1890

Text of statute as originally enacted

The engineer Arthur Cadlick Pain developed the scheme in greater detail. Two lines were authorised in 1890 by the Tottenham and Forest Gate Railway Act 1890 (53 & 54 Vict. c. clviii). They were built as a joint venture between the Midland Railway (MR) and the LTSR. Part of the longer 6 miles 4 chains (9.7 km) joint railway section was through recently built upon land and 343 newly-built homes were demolished. Rehousing would be easy because new houses were still being built. However, the railway was obliged to build 70 dwellings. Construction works were undertaken by Lucas and Aird. There was an official opening on 1 July 1894 and through goods traffic commenced on 2 July. The line opened to passengers on 9 July 1894. The shorter 32.5 chains (0.65 km) line was opened to passengers on the same day. It was built for the LTSR to connect Woodgrange Park with East Ham. Initially, local services ran between St Pancras or Moorgate and East Ham. Goods stations on the line opened on 1 September 1894. St Pancras–Tilbury boat trains and St Pancras–Southend trains commenced in 1895.

Both sections were taken over entirely by the MR in 1912, when the MR purchased the LTSR. The MR was amalgamated with other railways to create the London, Midland and Scottish Railway (LMS) on 1 January 1923. Through trains to Moorgate were withdrawn in 1931. The line became part of British Railways on 1 January 1948, initially as part of the London Midland Region and then the Eastern Region from 20 February 1949. Service to East Ham was withdrawn from 15 September 1958. From this date, local services ran between Kentish Town and Barking. Boat trains ceased running in 1962. The western terminus switched to Gospel Oak on 5 January 1981. In 2007, the railway become part of the London Overground network and has been known as the Suffragette line since November 2024.

== Route ==
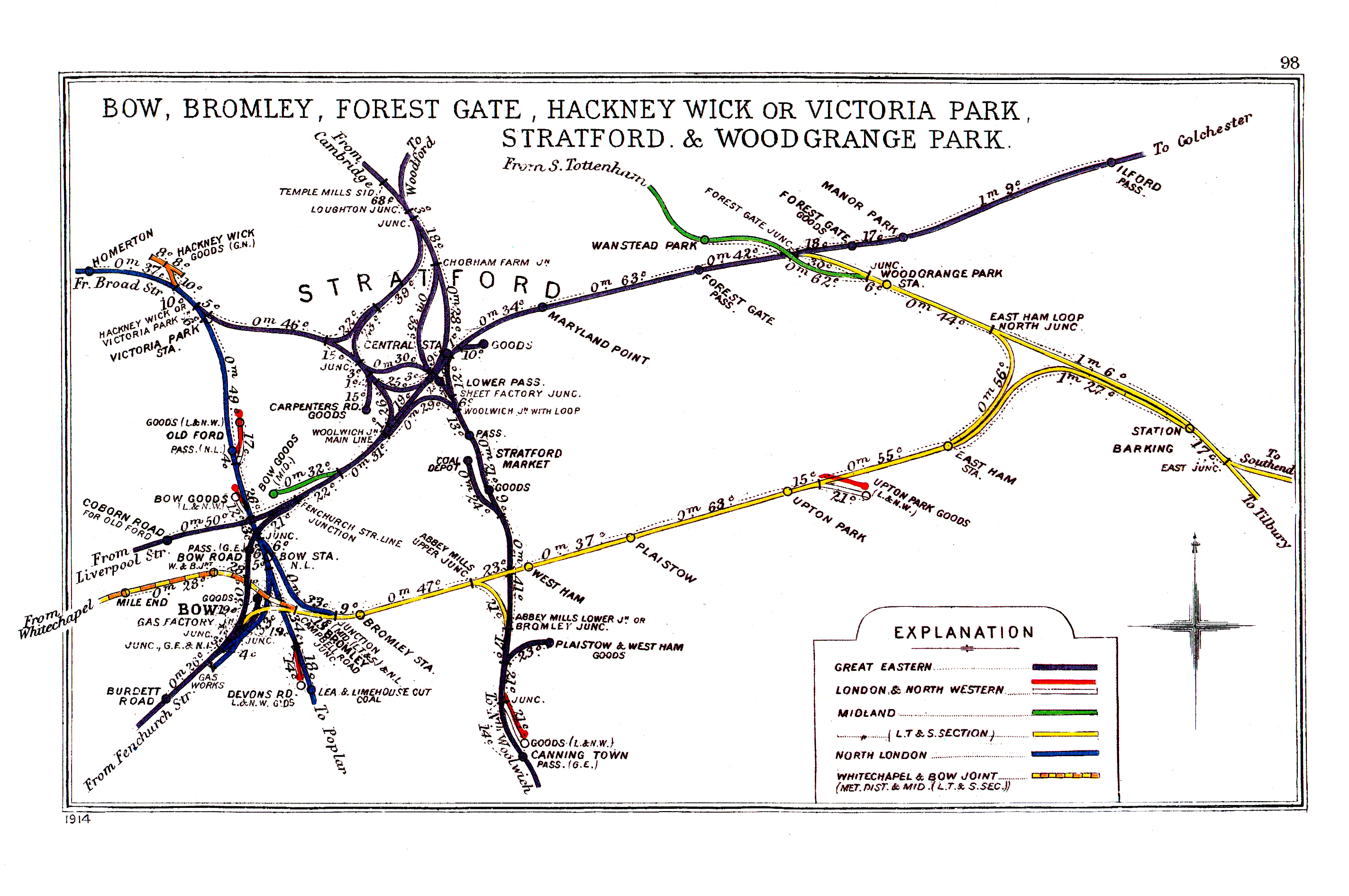
1914 map showing the eastern part of the line (in green), as well as the LTSR curve to East Ham (in yellow)

The line connected the existing South Tottenham THJR station with a new LTSR station at Woodgrange Park. It ran at ground level alongside Ferry Lane in order to pass between the Walthamstow Reservoirs. Once past Blackhorse Road, the area was already built-up and level crossings would not be permitted. The line was built in cutting to Walthamstow Boundary Road, which required the demolition of several recently built houses. It then continued on a brick viaduct, and a short section of embankment, to Leyton. Further demolition of housing was required through Leytonstone. The line descended towards Woodgrange Park on an embankment. Five new stations were built on the joint line. The LTSR also built a station at Woodgrange Park on a section of their existing line, and built a curve to a line running into a bay platform at East Ham.

== Design ==
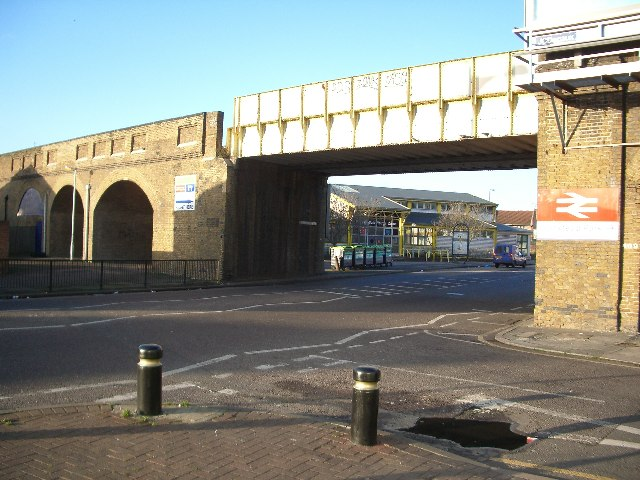
Viaduct and brick arches at Wanstead Park

Nothing remains of the original Lucas and Aird station buildings. The elevated stations at Leyton, Leytonstone and Wanstead Park had small brick-built booking offices next to the viaduct. Small brick station buildings with short street-facing canopies were found at Black Horse Road, taken out of use in 1981, and Walthamstow, demolished in 1995. None of the stations have retained their original wooden platform buildings, covered footbridges and zig-zag canopies. Leytonstone lost some platform canopy following bombing in the Second World War. Wanstead Park platform buildings were removed in 1970. Black Horse Road was the last to have the platform buildings demolished in 1977. The station, by now called Blackhorse Road, was relocated in 1981 to provide better interchange with the Victoria line. Basic 1970s brick platform shelters replaced the wooden platform buildings.

== List of stations ==
The line had the following stations (listed from west to east):

Station	Notes	References
South Tottenham and Stamford Hill	Existing THJR station, originally opened 1 May 1871	
Black Horse Road	New, opened 9 July 1894	
Walthamstow	New, opened 9 July 1894	
Lea Bridge Road	Unbuilt proposal	
Leyton	New, opened 9 July 1894	
Leytonstone	New, opened 9 July 1894	
Wanstead Park	New, opened 9 July 1894, called Forest Gate until opening	
Woodgrange Park	New LTSR station on existing line, opened 9 July 1894	
East Ham	New line to existing LTSR station, originally opened 31 March 1858 (Note: Abandoned 15 September 1958.)	
Barking	Existing LTSR station, originally opened 13 April 1854	

There were goods depots at Black Horse Road, Boundary Road (Walthamstow), Leyton and Leytonstone.
