= Walthamstow Queen's Road railway station =

Railway station in Walthamstow, London

Walthamstow Queen's Road
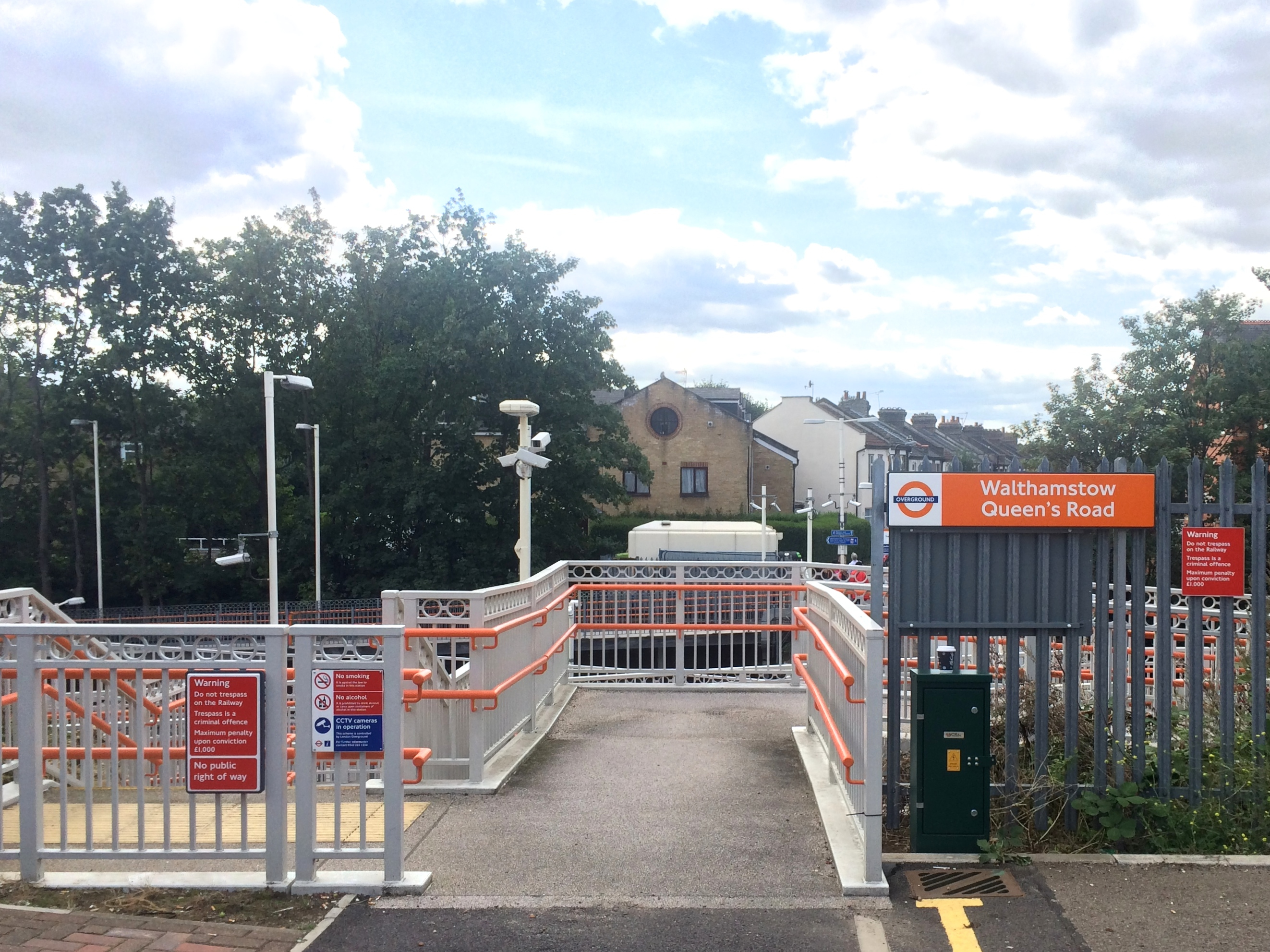
- The Ray Dudley Way station entrance in 2014
- Interactive map of Walthamstow Queen's Road

General information
- Location: Walthamstow
- Local authority: London Borough of Waltham Forest
- Managed by: London Overground
- Owner: Network Rail
- Station code: WMW
- DfT category: E
- Number of platforms: 2
- Accessible: Yes
- Fare zone: 3
- OSI: Walthamstow Central

National Rail annual entry and exit
- 2020–21: ▼0.404 million
- 2021–22: ▲0.690 million
- 2022–23: ▲0.765 million
- 2023–24: ▲0.956 million
- 2024–25: ▲0.997 million

Key dates
- 9 July 1894: Opened
- 6 May 1968: Renamed "Walthamstow Queen's Road"

Other information
- External links: Departures; Facilities
- Coordinates: 51.5817°N 0.024°W

Walthamstow Queen's Road railway station is a London Overground station on the Suffragette line between Blackhorse Road and Leyton Midland Road stations, 8 miles 7 chains (13.0 km) down the line from Gospel Oak. It is in London fare zone 3.

== History ==
It opened as "Walthamstow" on 9 July 1894 and was renamed on 6 May 1968 under British Rail.

== Design ==
There is step-free access from the street to both platforms.

== Location ==
The station stands on Edinburgh Road (not Queens Road) facing Walthamstow (Queens Road) Cemetery.

The station is about 330 yards (300 m) from Walthamstow Central station on the Weaver line and there is a direct footpath link between the two stations via a new exit onto Exeter Road. The footpath link, which opened in August 2014, is called Ray Dudley Way in commemoration of a local man who campaigned for the link for many years.

== Services ==
All services at Walthamstow Queen's Road are operated by London Overground using Class 710 EMUs.

The typical off-peak service is four trains per hour in each direction between Gospel Oak and Barking Riverside. During the late evenings, the service is reduced to three trains per hour in each direction.

Preceding station	London Overground	Following station
Blackhorse Road towards Gospel Oak	Suffragette line Gospel Oak to Barking line	Leyton Midland Road towards Barking Riverside
