= Leytonstone High Road railway station =

London Overground station

Leytonstone High Road
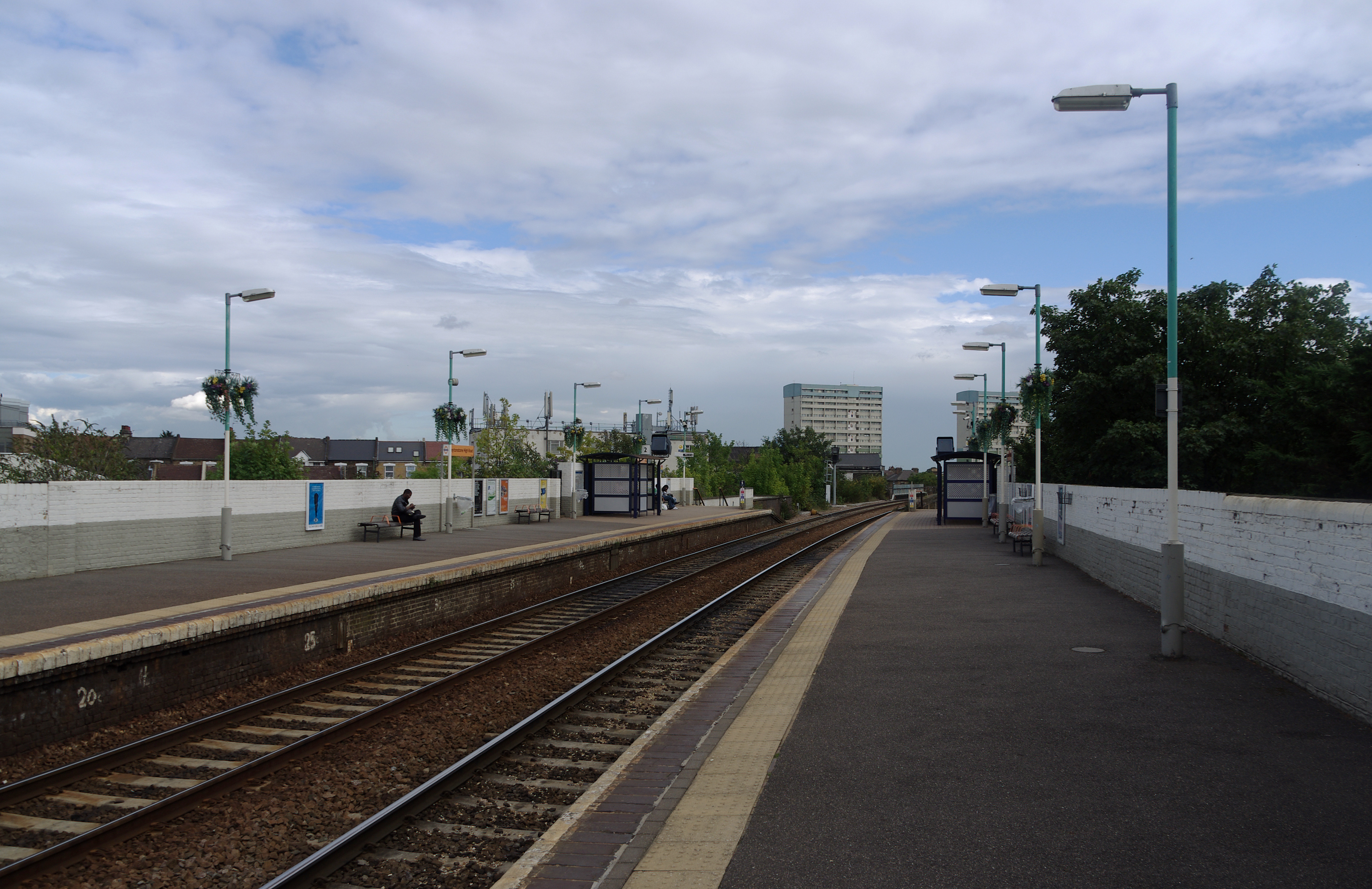
- The station in 2010
- Interactive map of Leytonstone High Road

General information
- Location: Leytonstone
- Local authority: London Borough of Waltham Forest
- Managed by: London Overground
- Owner: Network Rail
- Station code: LER
- DfT category: E
- Number of platforms: 2
- Fare zone: 3
- OSI: Leytonstone

National Rail annual entry and exit
- 2020–21: ▼0.438 million
- 2021–22: ▲0.802 million
- 2022–23: ▲0.841 million
- 2023–24: ▲1.018 million
- 2024–25: ▲1.152 million

Key dates
- 9 July 1894: Opened as Leytonstone
- 1 May 1949: renamed

Other information
- External links: Departures; Facilities
- Coordinates: 51.5634°N 0.0087°E

Leytonstone High Road is a railway station in Leytonstone in the London Borough of Waltham Forest, on the Gospel Oak to Barking line (currently branded as the Suffragette line of the London Overground), 9 miles 76 chains (16.0 km) down the line from Gospel Oak and situated between Leyton Midland Road and Wanstead Park. It has two platforms that are elevated approximately 20 feet (6 m) above ground level, each of which contains a metal shelter, covered but not completely enclosed. Ticket machines and Oyster validators (for touching in and out) are installed under the arch at the foot of the stairs.

== History ==
The station opened on 9 July 1894 as "Leytonstone" with the Tottenham & Forest Gate Railway. Originally, wagons were lowered from the arches to the ground-level goods yard by means of a hydraulic hoist. The station was renamed Leytonstone High Road on 1 May 1949. The original wooden platform buildings were destroyed by fire in the 1950s.

Ticket barriers were installed in 2016.

== Location ==
Although the railway crosses over the London Underground's Central line almost immediately north west of the station, there is no direct interchange; Leytonstone station is about a 10-minute walk away. Despite the distance, travellers using Oyster cards can make the interchange as part of a single journey.

London Buses routes 257 and W13 and night route N8 serve the station.

== Services ==
All services at Leytonstone High Road are operated by London Overground using Class 710 EMUs.

The typical off-peak service is four trains per hour in each direction between Gospel Oak and Barking Riverside. During the late evenings, the service is reduced to three trains per hour in each direction.

Preceding station	London Overground	Following station
Leyton Midland Road towards Gospel Oak	Suffragette line Gospel Oak to Barking line	Wanstead Park towards Barking Riverside
