= Wanstead Park railway station =

London Overground station

Wanstead Park
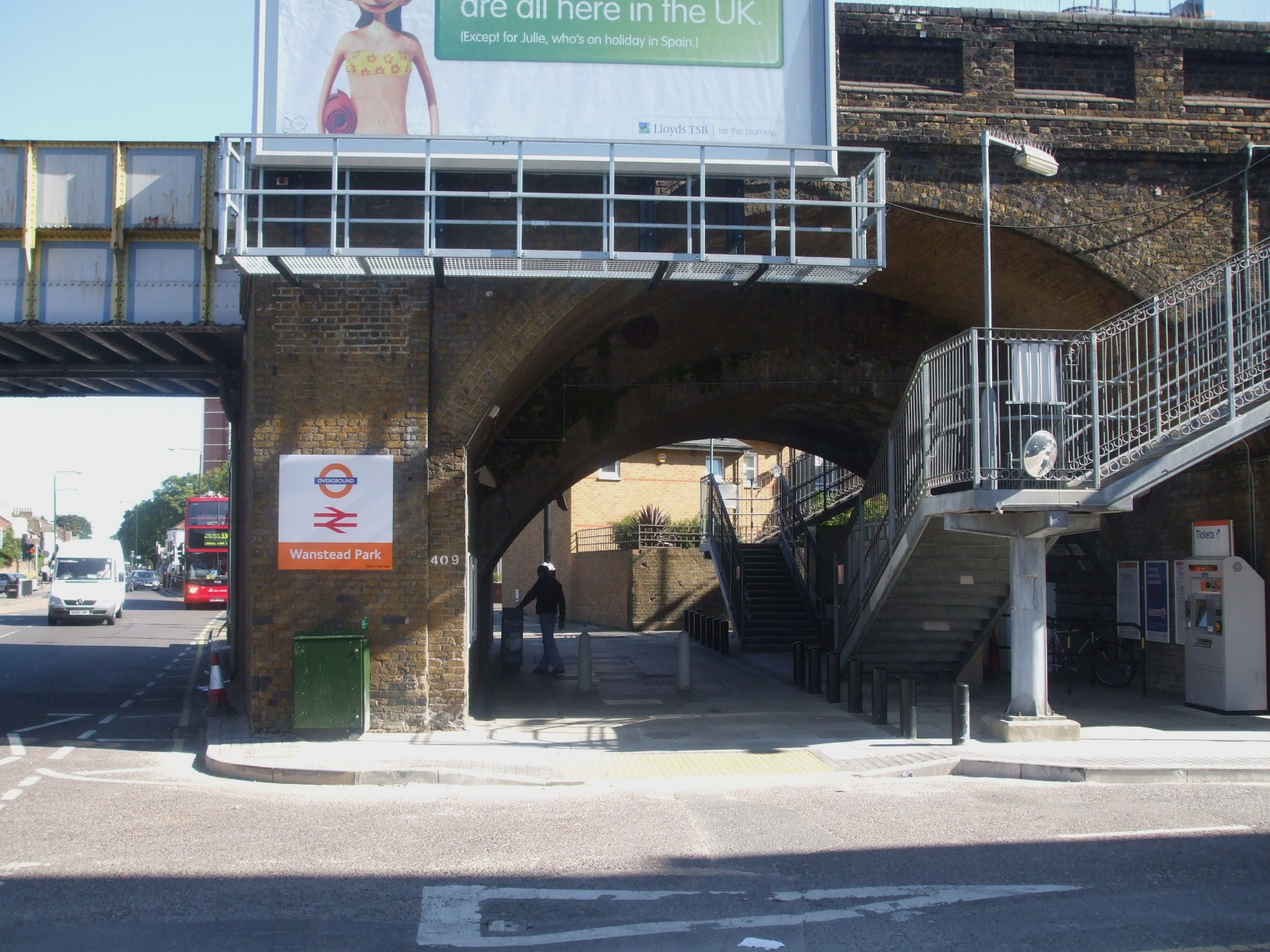
- Station entrance in 2008

General information
- Location: Forest Gate, Newham
- Coordinates: 51.5518°N 0.0264°E
- Owner: Network Rail
- Manager: London Overground
- Platforms: 2
- Connections: Out-of-station interchanges: Forest Gate

Other information
- Station code: WNP
- Fare zone: 3
- Classification: Category E
- Website: Official website

History
- Opened: 9 July 1894
- Original company: London, Tilbury and Southend Railway
- Pre-grouping: Midland Railway
- Post-grouping: London, Midland and Scottish Railway

Passengers

National Rail annual entry and exit
- 2021–22: ▲0.871 million
- Interchange: ▲13,397
- 2022–23: ▲0.891 million
- Interchange: ▼11,671
- 2023–24: ▲0.998 million
- Interchange: ▲44,292
- 2024–25: ▲1.071 million
- Interchange: ▼26,795
- 2025–26: ▲1.087 million
- Interchange: ▲28,815
Location
- Location in Newham

Wanstead Park is a railway station in Forest Gate, London. It is on the Suffragette line of the London Overground in London fare zone 3, 11 miles 11 chains (17.9 km) down the line from Gospel Oak and situated between Leytonstone High Road and Woodgrange Park. Despite its name, Wanstead Park station is not situated in Wanstead but in Forest Gate – and it is not near Wanstead Park but Wanstead Flats. The station was opened 9 July 1894.

== History ==
In July 1894 the Tottenham and Forest Gate Railway (TFGR), a joint venture between the London, Tilbury and Southend Railway (LTSR) and the Midland Railway (MR), opened a new railway between Tottenham and a junction just north of a new LTSR station at Woodgrange Park. In planning, the station was to be called Forest Gate, but the name was changed just before opening. The station was opened on 9 July 1894 by the TFGR in the northeast of the County Borough of West Ham, 0.4 kilometres (0.25 mi) south of the boundary with Wanstead and 2 kilometres (1.2 mi) southwest of Wanstead Park.

The line was electrified in 2016-7 – whilst the working was underway (from 6 June 2016 until February 2017), trains were replaced by buses between Barking & South Tottenham (until 23 September 2016) and then through to Gospel Oak thereafter.

== Location ==
The station is 360 yards (330 m) from Forest Gate station, according to TfL's journey planner, and this interchange is suggested in the National Rail Timetable.

London Buses routes 58, 308 and 330 serve the station.

== Services ==
All services at Wanstead Park are operated by London Overground using Class 710 EMUs.

The typical off-peak service is four trains per hour in each direction between Gospel Oak and Barking Riverside. During the late evenings, the service is reduced to three trains per hour in each direction.

Preceding station	London Overground	Following station
Leytonstone High Road towards Gospel Oak	Suffragette line Gospel Oak to Barking line	Woodgrange Park towards Barking Riverside
