= History of Harringay (1880–present) =

The advance of late Victorian urbanisation during the last twenty years of the 19th century swept away the 18th and early 19th-century houses, their grounds and the farmland. By 1900 Harringay was completely urbanised.

== Urbanisation & change ==
From 1894, Harringay was spread across the borders of the former urban districts, later municipal boroughs, of Hornsey and Tottenham in Middlesex.

Following the Second World War, Harringay began to change as immigration began to impact the nature of the town. In 1965 it was unified under one local authority with the creation of the London Borough of Haringey.

== 1880 to 1940 ==
=== The development of West Harringay ===
The earliest development in West Harringay followed the development of Finsbury Park and the construction of Endymion Road, which was started in about 1875 by the Metropolitan Board of Works. A small area of land between the Tottenham & Hampstead Junction Railway, Finsbury Park and Endymion Road was laid out as streets and fully developed by 1885.

Before this development was complete, the British Land Company purchased most of the Harringay Park Estate in June 1881. It was bought from successful builder William Hodson who had acquired the land in 1880 from the executors of Edward Chapman, the last owner of Harringay House and grounds. Also in 1881 the Great Northern Railway Company purchased a large slice of land, about half a mile long by 800 feet wide, at its broadest. The land, which ran along the western boundary of the estate, was used to construct a large railway sidings.

Having acquired the land, the British Land Company was responsible for most of the development of West Harringay. Originally established as part of the land reform movement, by the time the company was involved in Harringay's development it was operating as a purely commercial land company. Its role in Harringay was with the preliminaries of estate development—laying out the estate, building the roads and supplying major services. Once this was complete it auctioned off the land to builders.

For development purposes, the area was divided into two-halves: the 'Hornsey Station Estate' and the 'Harringay Park Estate'. The former estate was located close to Hornsey Station and included around a half of the total area of the Harringay Park Estate; it ran from Sydney Road to Effingham Road. To the south, the Harringay Park Estate included all the roads from Beresford Road to Atterbury Road.

The development of the railways in the area was critical to the development of housing. By 1880 the area was already well served with Hornsey, Harringay Green Lanes and Finsbury Park Stations. With the opening of Harringay station by the Great Northern Railway on 2 May 1885, the area was amongst the best served in London.

The pattern of housing development started closest to the railway stations. In the case of the 'Hornsey Station Estate' the first roads to be laid out were those nearest to Hornsey Station. Similarly, on the 'Harringay Park Estate', the earliest roads to be built were those nearest to Finsbury Park and Harringay Green Lanes stations. The pattern of subsequent development was for the Hornsey Station Estate to spread gradually southwards, whilst the Harringay Park Estate, likewise, was extended northwards until the two met.

The first mention of development on the estate was made in a report of the Plans Committee of the Hornsey Local Board in October later in the same year, when plans for the 'Hornsey Station Estate' were submitted by the British Land Company. In March 1881 plans were submitted for the 'Harringay Park Estate'.

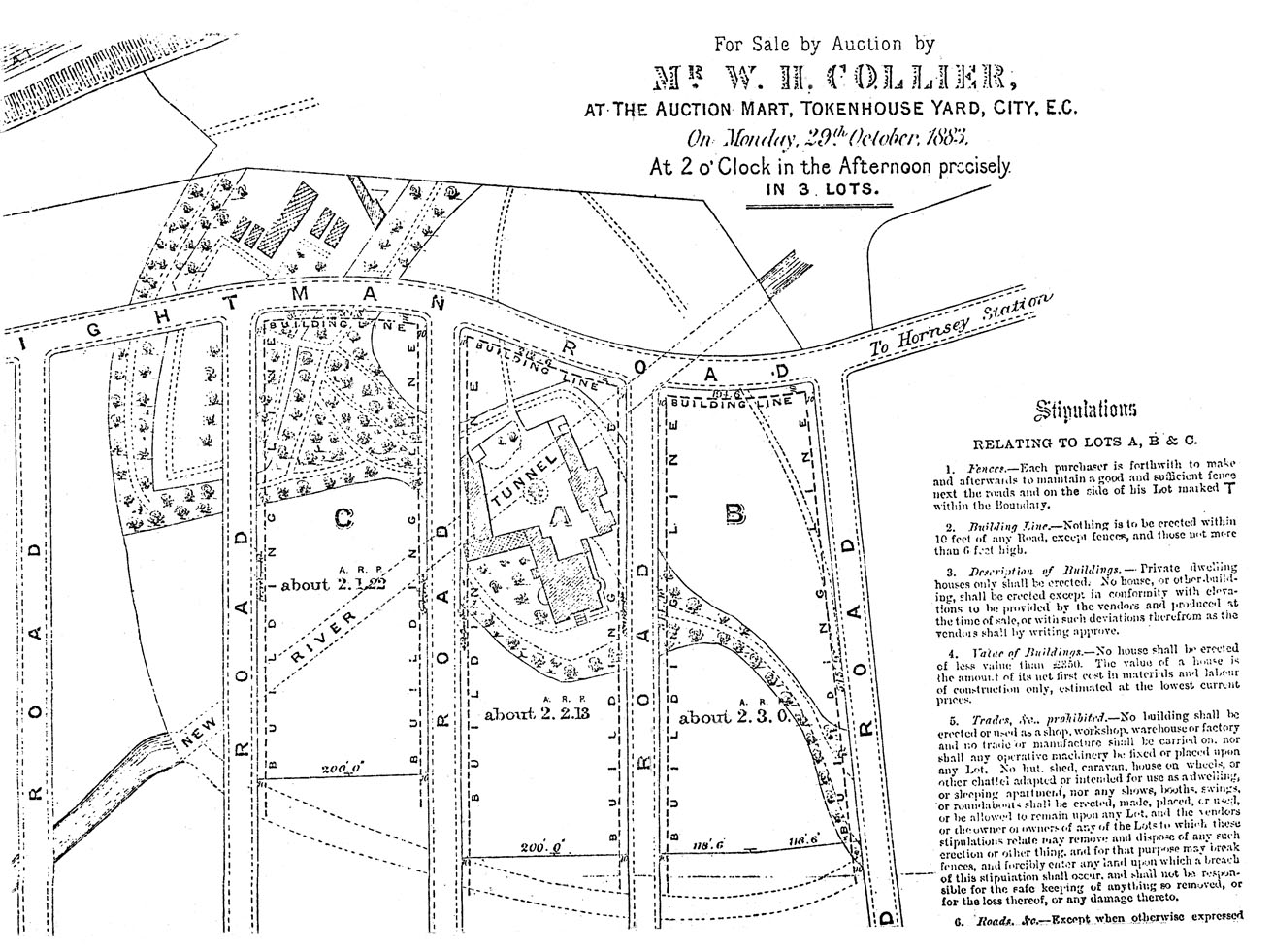
Part of a plan included in the material for one of the auctions held by the British Land Company. Harringay House is shown between Hewitt & Allison Roads.

Most of the auctions for both estates took place in the Auction room adjoining the Queen's Head Tavern, Green Lanes. On 7 July 1881 a local press advertisement appeared announcing the auction of the first portion of the Station estate. More than a year later, in September 1882, an advertisement announcing the auction of the first portion of the Harringay Park Estate appeared. This delay in the development of the Harringay Park portion was due to problems associated with providing adequate drainage facilities in the more difficult hilly terrain of the Harringay Park part of the estate. There was also the problem of finding a satisfactory way to divert the course of the New River in order to facilitate the provision of more building land. Because of the total size of the estates, it was some time before they were both fully laid out and the individual plots sold.

The first roads to be laid out were the Wightman Road, (as far as present day Beresford Road) set out by the Great Northern Railway Company, and what is now Effingham Road, by the British Land Company.

The British Land Company took great care to ensure that the type and value of the buildings were of a good quality. With development taking place in successive stages the type of development in one section would naturally affect the saleable value of areas that were yet to be developed and had not yet been put up for auction. Their concern is shown in a plan which was issued in connection with an auction of 119 lots on the Harringay Park Estate on 17 November 1884. Incorporated in the plan are stipulations. The following is an extract:

1.Fences - Each purchaser is forthwith to make and afterwards maintain a good and sufficient fence next the roads and on the sides of his lot ---- 2. Building lines --- On lot ----nothing is to be erected---- except fences, and those not more than six feet high,---- 3. Description of Buildings - Private Dwelling Houses only shall be erected on lots ----Dwelling Houses with shops for ordinary trade purposes may be erected on lots----No House, Shop, or other Building, shall be erected, except on conformity with elevations to be provided by the Vendors and produced at the time of sale---- 4. Value of Buildings - No House shall be erected on Lots---of less value than £350, and no building on lot---, if used as a tavern, shall be of less value than £700. The value of a House is the amount of its' net first cost in materials and labour of construction only, estimated at the lowest current prices. 5. Trades, prohibited - The trade of an Inn keeper, Victualler, or Retailer of Wine, Spirits, or Beer, except the retailing of bottles to be consumed off the premises is not to be carried on upon any Lot, except Lot --. No building shall be erected or used as a Shop, Workshop, Warehouse, or Factory, and no Trade, or Manufacture shall be carried on, nor shall 'any operative, Machinery be fixed or placed upon any Lot. No Hut, Shed, Caravan, House on wheels, or other Chattel adopted or intended for use as a dwelling or sleeping apartment nor any Shows, Booths, Swings, or Roundabouts shall be erected, made, placed, or used, or be allowed to remain upon any Lot and the Vendors or the owner or owners of any of the Lots to which these stipulations relate may remove and dispose of any such erection or other thing. 6. Roads - Except when otherwise expressed, all the ways are public highways -- 7. Mutual Covenants - Each conveyance shall contain covenants by the vendors and the purchaser to observe the above Stipulations with a proviso limiting the personal liability to the period of ownership.

Building Station Mansions, Wightman Road, next to the entrance of Hornsey Station.

Once building work started, many builders were at work on both estates. Most of the applicants requesting permission to build were from local addresses, certainly not more than 5 miles away from either estate - some applicants even lived on either one of the estates. In the majority of cases the scale of operations of each builder was not unusually large. The Hornsey Local Board minutes show that the biggest single development seems to have been one of 32 dwellings in Mattison Road, for which planning permission was granted in 1895. However, this seems to have been exceptional since most applications were for a dozen houses or less; in some cases for only one or two houses. The evidence of this can be still be seen today. At first glance most of the houses look the same, but a second look will reveal a considerable range of styles. With some care, it is possible to discern each small row or pair of houses. The table below shows how each estate developed.

Number of Houses Built and Occupied
	1878	1882	1886	1889	1892	1895	1899
Hornsey Station Estate	0	0	180	323	679	755	1,016
Harringay Park Estate	1*	1*	14	153	451	928	1,400
Total	1*	1*	194	476	1,130	1,683	2,416

* Harringay House

All the roads on both parts of the estate had been fully laid out and all houses built by 1899.

Although some local residents regarded the changing scene of Hornsey with dismay, it is clear from the local press that the changes were welcomed by the majority. This attitude, no doubt, reflected the Victorian obsession with the magic of size. The excitement with the scale and speed of the area's development can be discerned from comments made by the Chairman of the Hornsey School Board in 1883 during a visit to assess developments in the light of the possible need to provide a new school:-

The enormous neighbourhood which is just coming into being on what is known as the Harringay Park Estate --- At the time the Board was established in 1874, Turnpike Lane, upon which the Harringay Park Estate abuts was a narrow country-lane, with a footpath on one side only, and a hedge and ditch on both, but the country-like lane has given place to a well made public road of 50' width, and the fields and parks which formerly existed have been given over to the ever encroaching builder, while new interesting roads have been laid out in all directions and upon a scale which can only be described as gigantic. The whole aspect of this portion of the parish has been changed. In the place of fields there are now well paved and well lighted roads covered with rows of neat looking and attractive houses, while others are still passing through the transition stages.

Harringay House itself and three acres of ground around it was put up for auction on 29 October 1883. The British Land Company had hoped to sell the house as a viable building. The advertisement announcing its auction described it as being suitable for occupation by a large family or a charitable institution. However, with all the development going on in the immediate area and the whole character of the district changing rapidly, there was no interest in the building itself. In April 1885 an advertisement appeared in the local press announcing the auction of the first portion of the building materials and fittings of the house; obviously the house had been demolished. At intervals of approximately two months there were three further auctions selling off the remaining building materials and fittings of the house. In September of the following year even the trees were put up for auction for sale to timber merchants.

==== A community establishes itself ====
Wightman Road in 1906.

By the turn of the century a strong sense of civic pride had been created and many local residents looked with a sense of achievement at the size which Harringay had reached in such a short period of time. Most of the occupants of both the estates were from the middle or lower-middle classes, the area being especially popular with clerks commuting to the city.

Any suggestion, however remote, that the lower orders were about to assault the bastion of social exclusiveness produced a quite remarkable reaction. An example of this came when the Hornsey School Board were considering a proposal to erect a Board school either on the Hornsey Station Estate or at nearby Stroud Green. The furore caused by this proposal in both Harringay and Stroud Green was extreme.

In Harringay protest meetings were held, letters were sent to the Hornsey and Finsbury Park Journal, deputations bearing memorials of protest were sent to the Board; all of this in an effort to keep the school out of Harringay. At a meeting in Hermitage Road about the issue, a Mr. Cummings mentioned that the neighbourhood of Walthamstow had been utterly ruined by the erection of small houses and Board schools and that if a school were erected on the site proposed he, for one, would leave the district.

Faced with opposition from both Stroud Green and Harringay the School Board was caught between two opposing factions. Throughout 1890 and into 1891, numerous resolutions to build a school at either Stroud Green or Harringay were passed and reversed. In September 1891, they resolved once and for all to build a school in the Hornsey Station Estate purchased in 1883. Tenders were put out, work begun and the school opened to the junior boys and girls on 11 April 1893 and to the infants on 17 April 1893. Not long afterward, another Board school was erected in Duckett Road, and incidentally in Stroud Green.

Catering for religious needs there were, five churches on the combined estates. The first of these was the temporary St. Paul's Church of England (Iron Church) on the corner of Green Lanes and Burgoyne Road which opened on 23 December 1883. A permanent church at the other end of Burgoyne Road on the junction with Wightman Road opened in the early 1890s. St. Peter's, situated at the corner of Lausanne and Wightman Roads was opened in October 1884. At some time around 1888/1889 a Wesleyan Methodist Chapel opened in Hampden Road and early in 1891 the Primitive Methodists opened a Chapel in Mattison Road. The Emmanuel Union Chapel was built in Duckett Road at about the same time.

These various churches and chapels, as well as ministering to different religions needs, also provided social outlets by creating organisations such as choral and debating societies. Lectures on a wide range of topics, as well as concert entertainments, were also frequently held in some of the church halls. In this way a sense of local identity was created. Reinforcing this were the local residents' associations which existed on both estates from quite early on.

On the political level, it seems that the residents of the Harringay Park Estate were very politically conscious. In the first District Council election held in 1894, out of the 749 residents entitled to vote in the South Harringay ward, which comprised practically the whole of the Harringay Park Estate, 511 actually did so. As the Chairman of the Council commented afterwards The highest proportion of voters was in the South Harringay ward. While most of the western part of Harringay fell within the borough of Hornsey, the eastern fringe adjoining Green Lanes became part of a new ward within Tottenham in 1901 after the middle-class residents, chafing at their inclusion in the predominantly working-class wards of West Green and St. Ann's, sought to be transferred to Hornsey. Harringay ward was created out of parts of West Green and St. Ann's wards. Consequently, by 1901 there were three Harringay wards - North and South Harringay in the urban district of Hornsey (a municipal borough from 1903) and Harringay ward in that of Tottenham (a borough from 1934).

=== The development of East Harringay ===
Building to the east of Green Lanes started in the south-eastern part of the neighbourhood in the mid-1870s when Holloway-based contractor, William Williamson, built eight large houses on Green Lanes between the New River and Hermitage Road. During the same period, agreement was reached with the owners of the private Hermitage Road to widen it. In addition, Vale and Eade Roads were laid out. Eleven houses were built in Eade Road in 1881 and 1882 and 16 in Hermitage Road between 1880 and 1884. By the end of the decade most of the houses in this part of Harringay had been built, although there was some small scale, infilling through the 1890s.

A sizeable portion of land around Vale Road was developed for industrial use and by 1914 the area was one of three main pockets of industry in the Borough of Tottenham. Firms which were settled there included the wine gum manufacturers Maynards and piano makers Eavestaffs and Brasteds.

The largest portion of east Harringay, an area known today as 'The Gardens', was developed by the Provident Association of London. This was a quite different style of development to that which happened in the west of the neighbourhood. The company ran a financing scheme to enable the less well-off to purchase their own houses and built up an area measuring about a quarter of a square mile with uniform houses between 1893 and 1897. The houses were smaller than most of the houses to the west of Green Lanes. All the houses in the Gardens was built in this way by the Provident company with two exceptions. A few houses behind at the western end of Stanhope Gardens were built along with the National Provincial Bank (now Barclays Bank). Also, the houses on Salisbury Road, about 40 on the northern side of Kimberley Gardens and six on Chesterfield Gardens were built by J. C. Hill when he was building The Salisbury and Grand Parade.

To the north of St Ann's Road, the roads to the west of Woodlands Park Road had been laid out and fully developed by the early 1890s. A plot in Conway Road was developed as a fire station for the Tottenham Urban District Council Fire Brigade Station (Harringay District). Behind it was a municipal yard for the Harringay district depot of Tottenham Urban District Council. To the east of Woodlands Park Road, Hangar Lane Farm held on a few years longer and its fields were built up during the closing years of the century, being fully developed by 1902. Just beyond Harringay's borders, from 1892 the North-Eastern fever hospital (now St. Ann's) was built. in 19 acres on the south side of St. Ann's Road.

=== The development of Green Lanes ===
The style of development of the shops along Green Lanes mirrored that of the residential areas in that almost the whole of the eastern side was built as a single development whilst building on the western side was rather more piecemeal. Completed in 1899, the eastern side was developed almost entirely as the architecturally unified Grand Parade by J. C. Hill. It had more generously sized shops than those to the west and smart accommodation above. The single break in Grand Parade is created by the National Provincial Bank (now Barclays Bank), built in 1894. The western side was built up between 1892 and 1898. Some blocks were developed as parades by a single builder; others were developed by a number of builders and the range of styles used give these blocks a somewhat higgledy-piggeldy appearance. Directories during the first decade of the twentieth century suggest that the accommodation above the shops in Grand Parade was very respectable with surgeons and doctors counted among the residents.

Harringay entered the 20th century a more or less fully developed suburb of London occupied for the most part by middle or lower-class people. For many years to come it was to stay largely unchanged in character.

Source: This section relies largely on the paper by Alan Aris, to whom the principal author is most grateful.The Urban Development of Hornsey, published by the Hornsey Historical Society.

== Harringay during the Second World War ==
Whilst Harringay was luckier than some areas of London during World War II, it did not survive unscathed. A number of V-1 and V-2 bombs fell in Harringay, including one on Warwick Gardens, which destroyed or damaged a number of houses and the 'Ever Ready' factory that stood on the corner of St Ann's Road and Warwick Gardens. Some of the Ladder roads were also affected by attempts to bomb the railway around Hornsey station. RAF aerial reconnaissance shows a path of bomb damage across the roads near the station heading towards the railway. This included the area at the western end of Fairfax and Falkland Roads where the damaged houses were never rebuilt. The area is now a small park.

== 1945 to the present day ==
Green Lanes 1949, between Cavendish & Burgoyne Roads, The photo was originally titled A bad shop front Conversion

After the war, Harringay's carefully crafted English middle class respectability began to disappear. Houses became more crowded as more were split into bedsits. A photographic survey undertaken in the late 1940s showed the beginnings of the disappearance of the old shop front facades and the hint of some neglect. The population also changed, becoming more working class and English-born residents beginning to be replaced by an influx of mainly Irish and Greek Cypriot immigrants (between 1959 and 1961 10,000 English-born people left the borough of Hornsey, including Harringay, while among the newcomers were over 9000 born outside the UK - 3000 from the Republic of Ireland).

By the 1950s the area was especially popular with Greek immigrants from Cyprus and it began to take on a distinctly Greek side to its character with the Greek Cypriots, and the Turkish Cypriots who followed, initially largely engaged in the garment industry. Although by the late 1980s the Greek population was beginning to disperse, the Cypriot connection remained as Turkish Cypriots, and then Turks and Kurds, began to occupy many of the shops on Green Lanes. As a result, it gained a reputation as a lively area with many Turkish restaurants, jewellers, and fruit and vegetable shops. For a short period Turkish and Kurdish criminal groups used Green Lanes as a base to run national drug operations and more local protection schemes. Such activity subsided followed a police crackdown after the death of a man in a street battle in November 2002.

Despite their ubiquitous presence along Green Lanes, the Turks and Kurds were not present in great numbers in the residential streets of Harringay. A number of the houses were converted to flats and a new wave of more affluent young middle class professionals began to move in, taking advantage of the fact that, despite rapidly appreciating property prices, Harringay was one of the relatively more affordable areas within easy access of central London to buy or rent a home. Following the expansion of the European Union after 2004 to include eleven central and east European states, many migrants from these countries, especially Poles, also moved into Harringay and by the end of the decade Polish shops were becoming an increasingly common sight along Green Lanes.

From 1965 Harringay formed part of the new London borough of Haringey, incorporating the former municipal boroughs of Hornsey and Tottenham and controlled by the Labour Party since 1971. After the reorganisation of parliamentary constituencies in 1982 all of it was included within the Tottenham constituency. This was politically significant because Tottenham (Tottenham North and South until 1950) has returned Labour members to the House of Commons ever since 1935 while Hornsey (Hornsey and Wood Green after 1983) returned Conservatives from its creation in 1885 until 1992 (when Labour first won the now marginal seat, then lost it to the Liberal Democrats in 2005 and regained it in 2015).

The changing social composition of the neighbourhood had political repercussions. Although the Labour Party managed to retain control of the borough in the 2006 and 2010 local elections, fending off a strong challenge from the Liberal Democrats, it lost two of the three seats in the Harringay ward to the Liberal Democrats in both polls. As had been the case a century earlier, despite lying just to the east of the north–south railway marking the political fault line across the borough (in 2010, except in Harringay, Labour won all the council seats to the east and none to the west), the increasingly middle class residents of Harringay at the beginning of the 21st century were again demonstrating their difference. However, Labour again won all the Harringay ward seats in 2014, retaining them with an increased majority four years later.

The area retained its original Victorian architectural landscape almost intact. Beyond the few war damaged buildings and a small proportion of post-war infill building, the Electric Cinema on the corner of St Ann's Road was the only Victorian building to be replaced. The commercial frontage on Green Lanes however was not preserved and is now an eclectic mix of late 20th and early 21st century commercial styling.

== Entertainment ==
=== The Stadium and Arena ===
Harringay Stadium opened in 1927 as a major greyhound racing venue, the stadium was soon serving a dual purpose, also host to a famous speedway track. Next door the shorter-lived Harringay Arena opened in 1936 between the Stadium and Green Lanes. It was home, amongst many other things, to ice hockey, boxing, circuses, greyhound racing, stock car racing, the Horse of the Year Show (from 1949 to 1958), classical music and a famous crusade by the American evangelist Billy Graham in 1954. The Arena had closed by 1958, while the Stadium continued racing dogs until 1987.

However, things were nearly very different. In 1912, when Arsenal Football Team was seeking to relocate from Woolwich, Harringay was one of three sites, along with Battersea and Highbury, shortlisted for the team's new ground. The proposed site in Harringay was presumably where the stadium and arena were built in the 1920s and 1930s.

=== Cinemas ===
In its days as an entertainment centre for London, Harringay in North London also provided more locally directed entertainment in the shape of four cinemas. The earliest was opened in 1910 and was operating as a cinema until January 2003.

Harringay was also home to a film studio operated by George Merino and British Animated Productions, which produced the first British technicolour cartoon, Bubble & Squeak (A series of five cartoons about Bubble, a taxi driver, and Squeak, his sentient car, who get into various silly adventures together.)

=== Other ===
Harringay saw the birth of one of the UK's best known wine stores when Majestic Wine opened their first store in Colina Mews, Harringay, in 1981.

== Transport and communications history ==
There is little doubt that the history of transport communications through Harringay had a decisive effect on shaping it today.

=== Roadways ===
In Roman times, a great roadway to the north was established (see Early history). This roadway endured as a great communication passage to the north and brought much activity through the heart of the area. It also acted as the rough dividing line for land ownership, establishing Harringay's position on the edge of manorial and subsequently borough boundaries.

During the early 1960s, Harringay was the location for ground-breaking pedestrian control arrangements instituted by the then Transport Minister Ernest Marples.

=== Rail ===
==== Great Northern Railway ====
In the mid nineteenth century, the arrival of the Great Northern Railway (GNR) divided Harringay from the rest of its ancient borough. The subsequent arrival of the Tottenham and Hampstead Junction Railway (THJR) almost defined its present-day southern boundary. Harringay's development in the late 19th century was of a markedly different nature than that which occurred to the west of the GNR and so the south of the THJR.

The GNR opened through the area in 1850 when Hornsey was the first stop after London. The station was re-sited in 1866, when the old lines became sidings. In response to the growing development in the area, Harringay station was opened on 2 May 1885.

==== Tottenham & Hampstead Junction Railway ====
The Tottenham & Hampstead Junction Railway, running east–west towards the south of the area, opened in 1880. Harringay Green Lanes railway station was originally named just 'Green Lanes'. Two years later it was renamed to 'Harringay Park, Green Lanes'. In June 1951 the name changed to 'Harringay Park' and in October 1958 it became 'Harringay Stadium'. Then in May 1990 the name was again changed to reflect the closure of the stadium; the name chosen this time was 'Harringay East'. The station got its present name a year later in May 1991.

==== Palace Gates Line ====
The short-lived Palace Gates Line running just to the north of Harringay operated from 1878 to 1963. It ran from Liverpool Street through Seven Sisters, West Green, Wood Green (Palace Gates) and North to Hertford.

==== Great Northern and City Railway ====
The Great Northern and City Railway was first planned in 1891 to bring commuters into the heart of the city at Moorgate. The Great Northern Railway Company took an obvious interest in the project from the start. They put onerous conditions on the use of Finsbury Park, gained powers in an act of Parliament to forbid extension of the proposed line north of the station, and eventually managed to get it bottled up in a tube station underneath the mainline one.

The line was eventually opened in 1904 running from Moorgate to Finsbury Park. A few years after the formation of London Transport, the line was transferred to the Northern line for operational purposes, then being called the "Northern City Line". When the Victoria line was built, the Great Northern & City Railway services were cut back to Drayton Park, and the tube station at Finsbury Park was rebuilt to allow cross-platform interchange between the Victoria and Piccadilly lines. In March 1970 it was renamed again, to the "Northern line - Highbury Branch". Eventually London Underground closed the branch in 1975 and transferred ownership to British Rail, who installed new connections to the main line south of Finsbury Park. Finally the route has taken on its original intended purpose of providing a City terminus for suburban services, now run from Moorgate to Hertford, Welwyn, and Letchworth.

=== The Tube ===
The story of a Harringay tube station is one of near-misses. Provision for a Tube station at Harringay actually made it into plans contained in the Great Northern and Strand Railway (GNSR) Act of Parliament of 1899, which gave the go-ahead for a new line running from Wood Green to Aldwych. Stations were to be built at Wood Green, Hornsey, Harringay, Finsbury Park, Holloway, Bingfield Street/York Road, Russell Square, Holborn and Strand (adjacent to Aldwych). On the northern section, the line would have run below the Great Northern Railway with stations beneath the existing mainline ones. Finance for the new line, however, was problematic and eventually the scheme was taken over by an American sponsor, Charles Tyson Yerkes. Yerkes also owned two other railway companies, which had plans to build similar routes. He decided that financial viability meant they should be incorporated into one line. The Piccadilly line opened in 1906; Finsbury Park on 15 December. However, at the eastern end of the line, the Great Northern Railway considered the territory beyond Finsbury Park their own, and they vetoed any extension beyond that point. This remained the situation until public opinion became strong enough to reverse the veto.

In the early 1930s, with the opposition swept aside, plans to extend the Piccadilly line from Finsbury Park up to Wood Green and beyond were made public. However, the plans no longer included stops at either Harringay or Hornsey. A campaign by the Harringay Ratepayers' Association tried to get a station built near to St Ann's Road; however, the campaign failed because London Underground argued that an additional stop would increase the journey times to central London above their targets. The section from Finsbury Park to Arnos Grove was opened on 19 September 1932.

== See also ==
- Municipal Borough of Hornsey for the local government unit of which Harringay was part from 1903 to 1965
- London Borough of Haringey for the local government unit of which Harringay has been part since 1965
