= Stroud Green railway station =

Former railway station in north London, England

Stroud Green
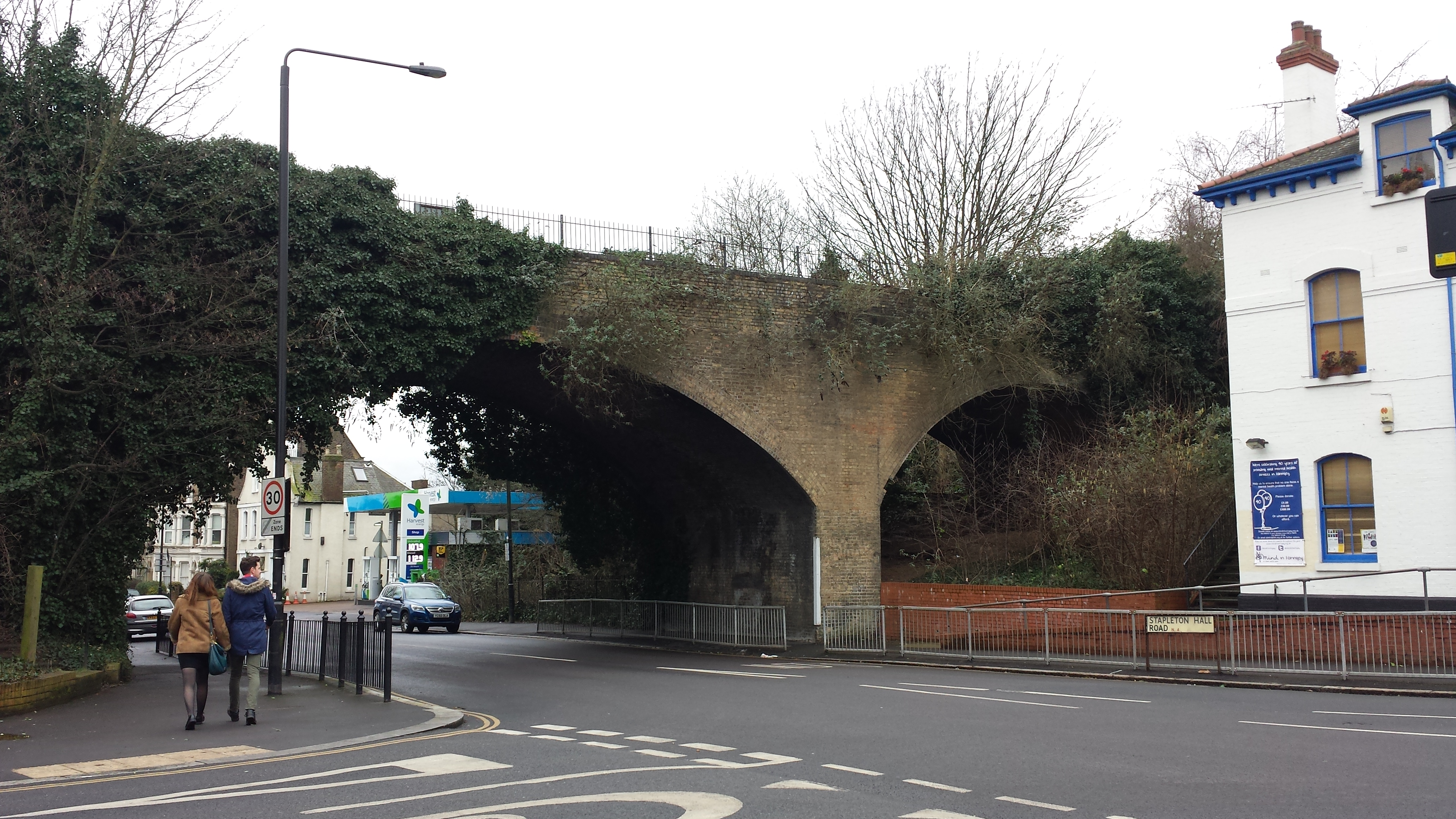
- Bridge and station master's house (2015)

- Location of Stroud Green in Greater London
- Location: Stroud Green
- Local authority: Haringey
- Owner: Great Northern Railway
- Number of platforms: 2

Key dates
- 1881: Opened
- 29 October 1951: Closed
- 7 January 1952: Reopened
- 5 July 1954: Closed permanently
- Replaced by: none

Other information
- Coordinates: 51.5731°N 0.1129°W

Stroud Green railway station served the Stroud Green area of north London, England, between 1881 and 1954. It lay between Finsbury Park and Crouch End stations, on a bridge over Stapleton Hall Road. The station had platforms (now demolished) cantilevered from the bridge structure and a wooden station building (also now demolished) at ground level under and on either side of the bridge, with a station master's house to the north of it.

== History ==
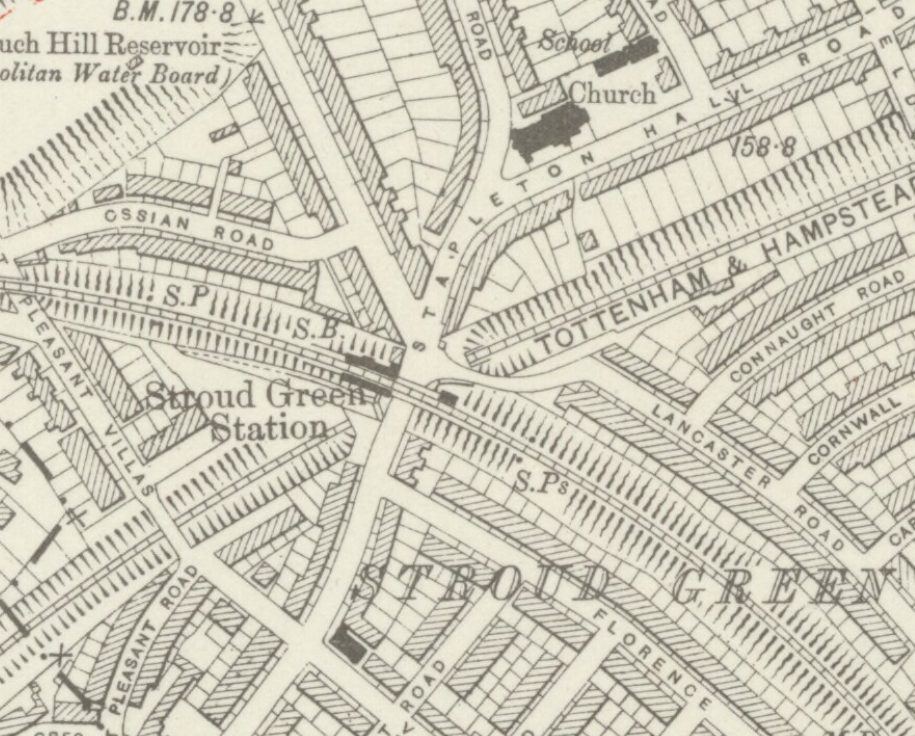
The station's location on a 1920 map

The station was built by the Great Northern Railway (GNR) and opened on the existing Edgware, Highgate and London Railway on 11 April 1881. The line ran from Finsbury Park to Edgware via Highgate, with branches to Alexandra Palace and High Barnet. After the Railways Act 1921 created the Big Four railway companies, the line became part of the London & North Eastern Railway (LNER) in 1923.

In 1935, London Underground planned, as part of its New Works Programme to take over the line from LNER, modernise it for use with electric trains and amalgamate it with the Northern line.

Works to modernise the track began in the late 1930s and were well advanced when they were interrupted and halted by the Second World War. Works were completed from Highgate to High Barnet and Mill Hill East and that section was incorporated into the Northern line between 1939 and 1941. Further works on the section between Finsbury Park, Highgate and Alexandra Palace were postponed, and the line continued under the operation of the LNER. After the war, the dwindling passenger numbers and a shortage of funds lead to the cancellation of the unfinished works in 1950. British Railways, the successor to the LNER, closed the line temporarily from 29 October 1951 until 7 January 1952; passenger services to Stroud Green were ended after the last train on 3 July 1954, along with the rest of the line between Finsbury Park and Alexandra Palace.

The line continued to be used for goods into the 1960s and by London Underground for train stock movements until September 1970 and was officially completely closed on 5 October 1970. The station buildings were gutted by a fire on 3 February 1967 and were demolished shortly thereafter. The track was lifted in 1972.

Disused railways
Crouch End; Line and station closed	British Railways (Eastern Region); Edgware, Highgate and London Railway	Finsbury Park; Line closed, station open
Abandoned Northern Heights extension
Preceding station	London Underground	Following station
Crouch End towards Bushey Heath, High Barnet or Alexandra Palace	Northern line	Finsbury Park via Northern City Line towards Moorgate

== Location ==
The Gospel Oak to Barking line passes under both Stapleton Hall Road and the station site, in a tunnel between Crouch Hill and Harringay Green Lanes stations; it can be seen from the former platforms of Stroud Green station. The site lies within the area of the London Borough of Haringey, close to that borough's boundary with that of Islington.

== The site today ==
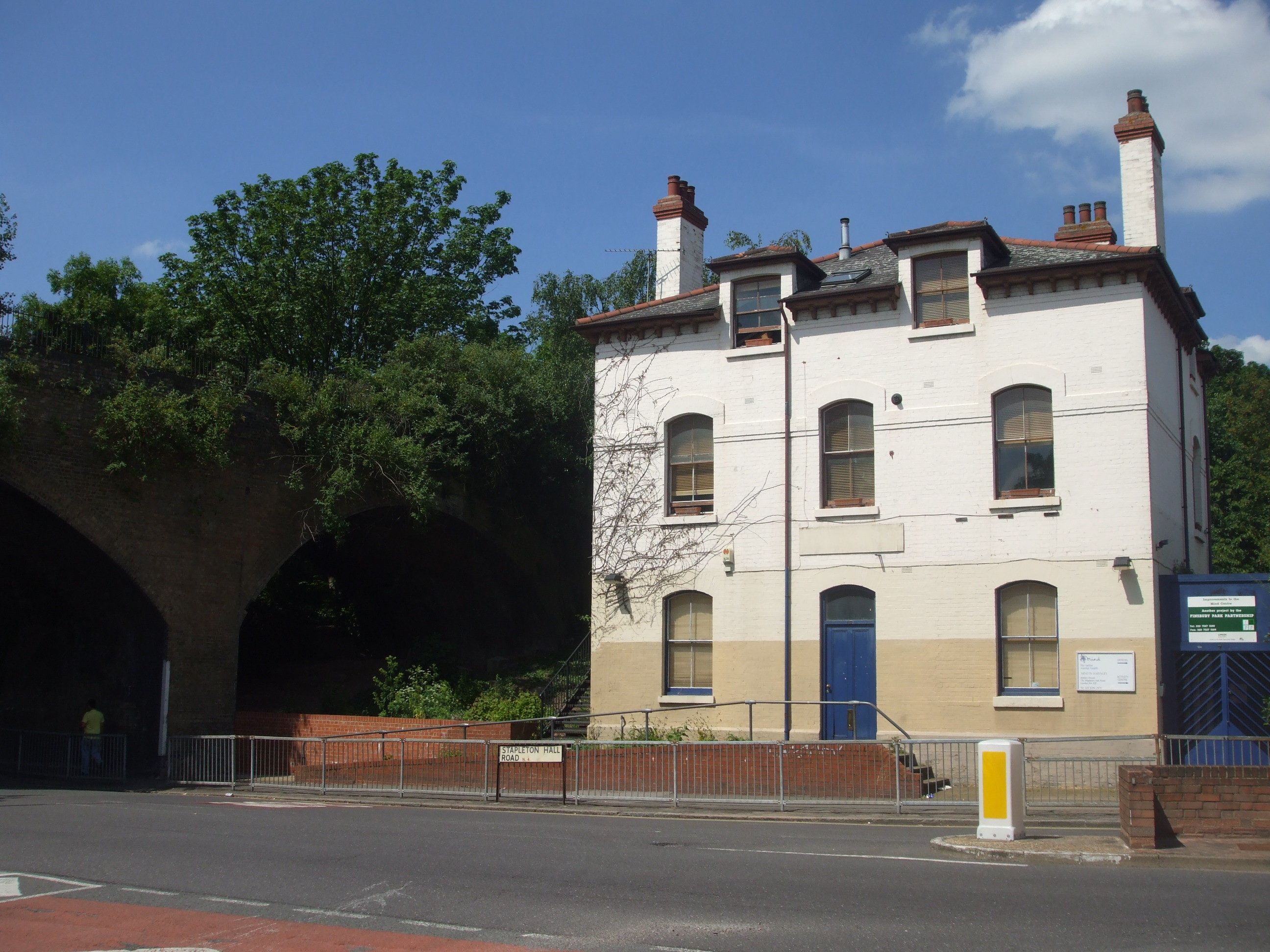
The station master's house (2010)

The bridge and the station master's house are extant; the latter now serves as a community centre.

Most of the trackbed between Muswell Hill and Finsbury Park is now a rail trail, called the Parkland Walk.
