= Harringay Station =

Harringay Station may refer one of two railway stations in Harringay, North London:

- Harringay railway station - a north–south station off Wightman Road
- Harringay Green Lanes railway station - an east–west station on Green Lanes
