= Harringay Green Lanes =

Harringay Green Lanes may refer to:

- Harringay Green Lanes railway station, a railway station in the neighbourhood of Harringay
- Harringay, a neighbourhood in the London Borough of Haringey sometimes incorrectly referred to as 'Harringay Green Lanes' because of the railway station.
