= Crouch Hill railway station =

London Overground station

Crouch Hill
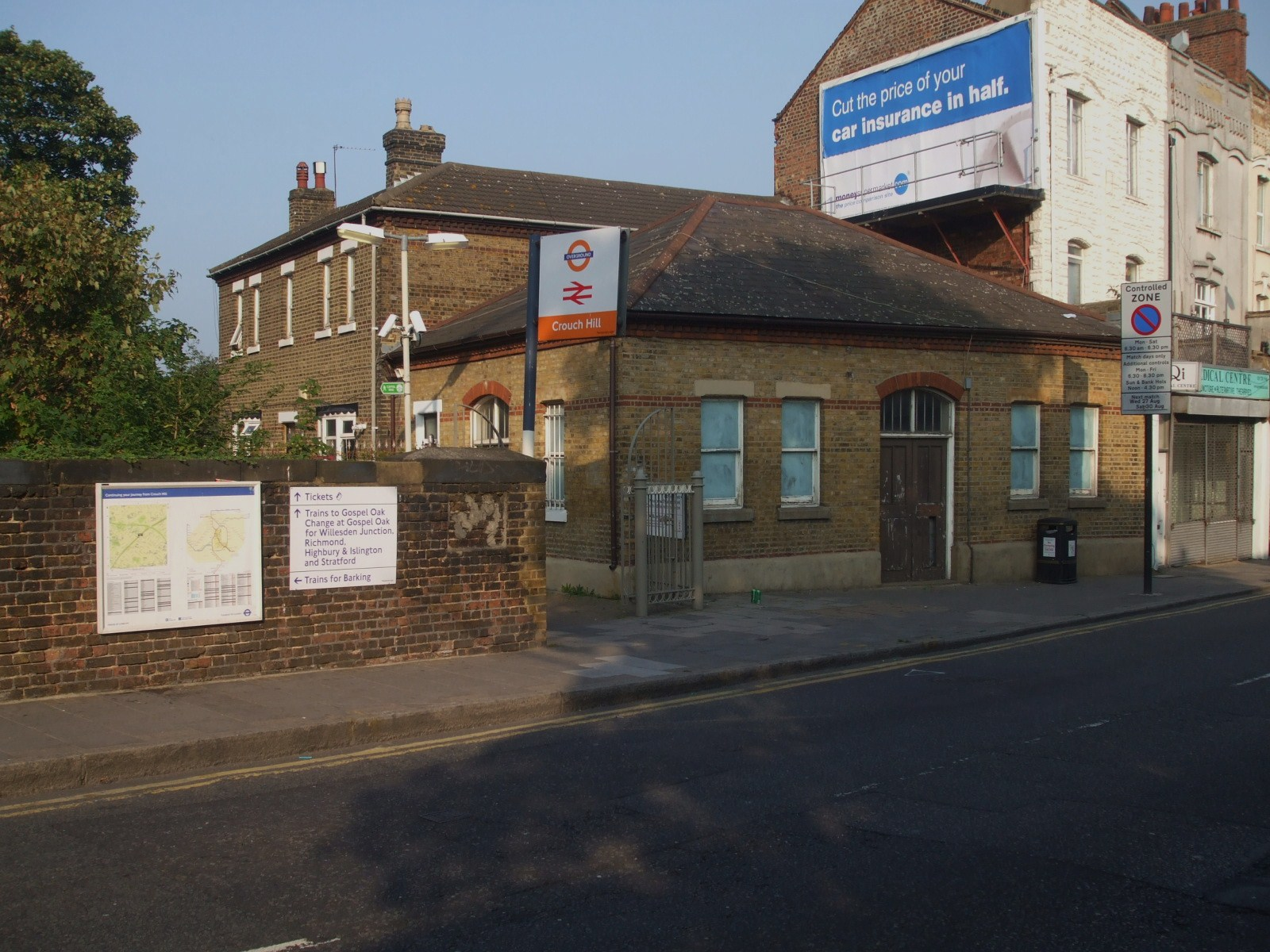
- The station
- Interactive map of Crouch Hill

General information
- Location: Stroud Green
- Local authority: London Borough of Islington
- Managed by: London Overground
- Owner: Network Rail
- Station code: CRH
- DfT category: E
- Number of platforms: 2
- Fare zone: 3

National Rail annual entry and exit
- 2020–21: ▼0.353 million
- 2021–22: ▲0.668 million
- 2022–23: ▲0.726 million
- 2023–24: ▲0.858 million
- 2024–25: ▲0.901 million

Key dates
- 21 July 1868: Opened

Other information
- External links: Departures; Facilities
- Coordinates: 51.5713°N 0.1171°W

Crouch Hill is a station on the Suffragette line of the London Overground, located on Crouch Hill in the London Borough of Islington, north London. It is 3.8 miles (6.1 km) from St Pancras (measured via Kentish Town and Mortimer Street Junction) and is situated between Upper Holloway and Harringay Green Lanes.

The National Location Code (NLC) for this station is 7406.

== Design ==
The station has two platforms, one for each direction. Platform 1 is for trains toward Gospel Oak and platform 2 is for trains toward Barking Riverside. This station does not have a ticket office except for the security office, which is not officially part of the station but is next to the stairs to one of the platforms. However, staff are present on the platforms during the hours trains are running. This station has two ticket and two Oyster card machines; one for each platform as well as two waiting rooms. This station has a shelter on each platform. The platforms are only reachable by stairs.

There are no current plans to introduce lift access. The station was briefly equipped with APTIS ticketing equipment in 1988–89.

== Services ==
All services at Crouch Hill are operated by London Overground using Class 710 EMUs.

The typical off-peak service is four trains per hour in each direction between Gospel Oak and Barking Riverside. During the late evenings, the service is reduced to three trains per hour in each direction.

Preceding station	London Overground	Following station
Upper Holloway towards Gospel Oak	Suffragette line Gospel Oak to Barking line	Harringay Green Lanes towards Barking Riverside
	Disused railways	
Hornsey Road	Tottenham and Hampstead Junction Railway	Harringay Green Lanes

== Connections ==
Whilst the station has no direct interchange to a tube station, Finsbury Park station is a fifteen-minute walk away along Stroud Green Road. Archway tube station is also a twenty-minute walk away.

London Buses routes 210 and W7 serve the station.
