= St Ann's Road railway station =

Railway station

Coordinates: 51°34′46″N 0°4′51″W

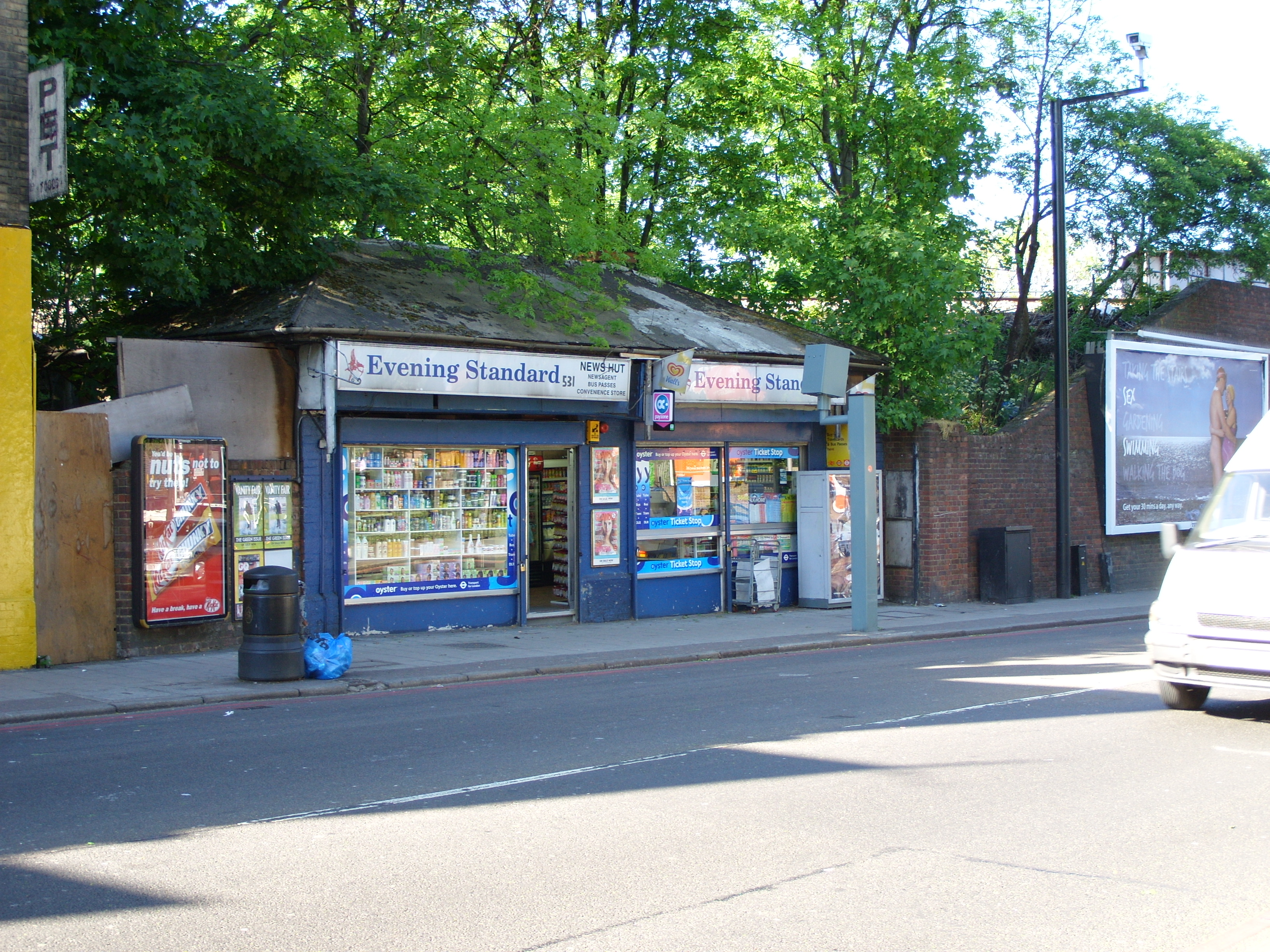
The former station building on Seven Sisters Road, latterly a newsagent

St Ann's Road railway station was opened by the Tottenham & Hampstead Junction Railway on 2 October 1882. It was at the corner of St Ann's Road and Seven Sisters Road in N15, in south west Tottenham, in what is now the London Borough of Haringey.

It comprised two wooden platforms, accessed by a footbridge and stairs, and a brick building.

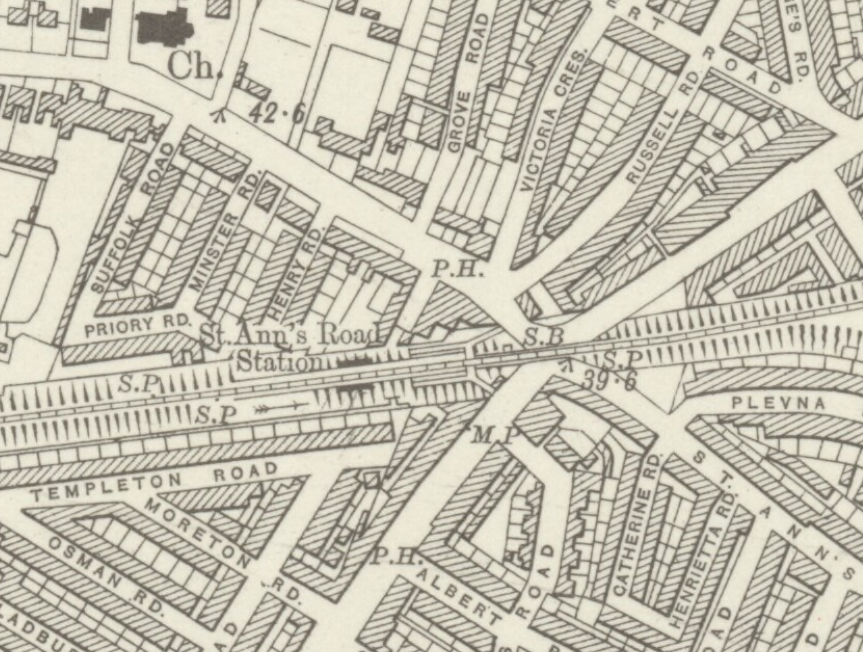
St Ann's Road station on a 1920 map

The service at the station was generally between St Pancras or Kentish Town and Barking or Southend, however at times trains ran to some other destinations including Cambridge, Chingford and Victoria.

It was never well used, mainly as it was near South Tottenham and Seven Sisters stations, the latter giving a much faster link to The City. The station was closed on 9 August 1942 as a wartime austerity measure and never reopened. The station building survived as a newsagent's until October 2012, when the building was demolished.

Preceding station	Disused railways	Following station
Harringay Green Lanes	Tottenham & Hampstead Junction Railway	South Tottenham
