= Upper Holloway railway station =

London Overground station

Upper Holloway
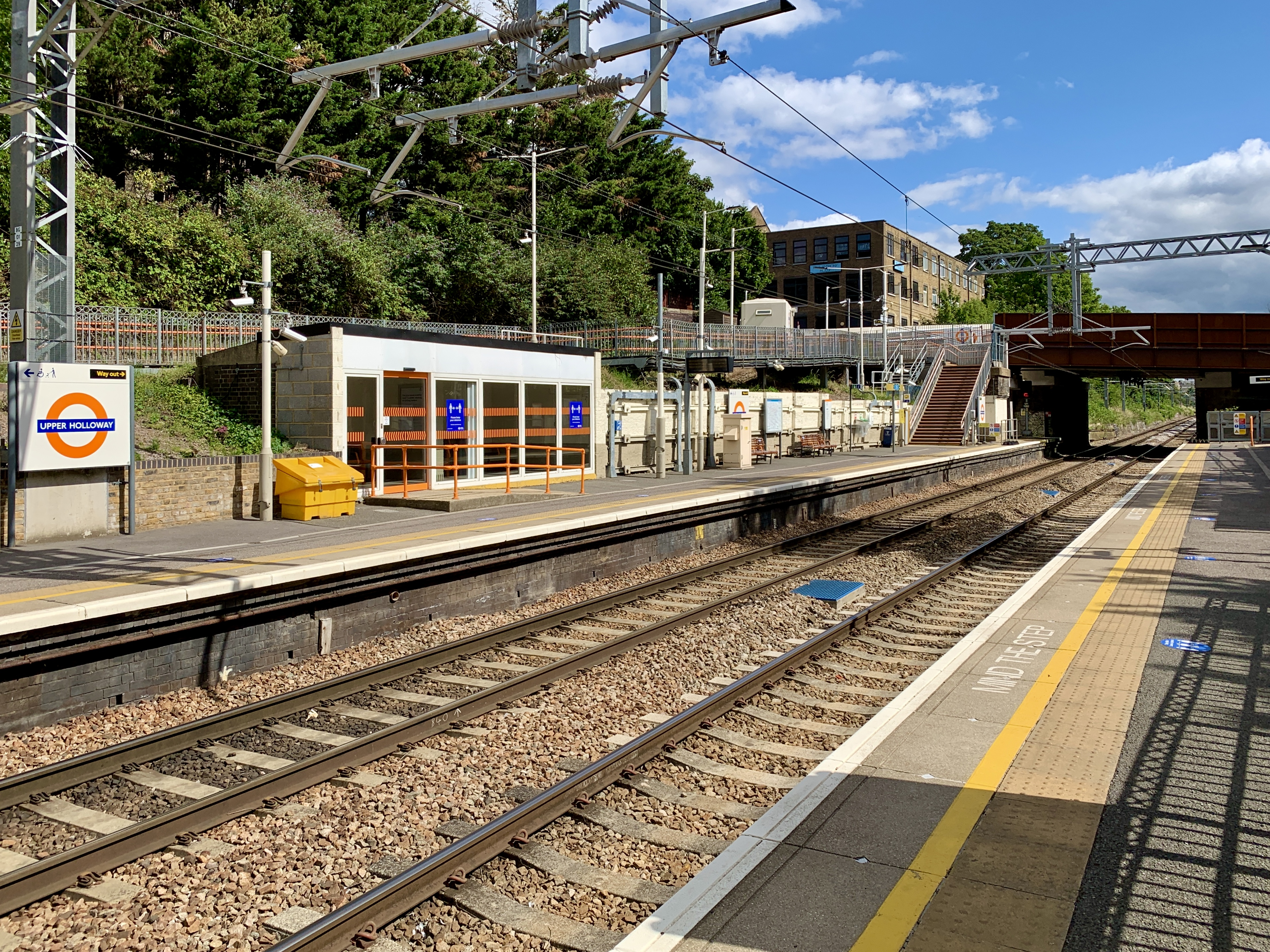
- The station in 2020
- Interactive map of Upper Holloway

General information
- Location: Upper Holloway
- Local authority: London Borough of Islington
- Managed by: London Overground
- Owner: Network Rail
- Station code: UHL
- DfT category: E
- Number of platforms: 2
- Accessible: Yes
- Fare zone: 2
- OSI: Archway

National Rail annual entry and exit
- 2020–21: ▼0.595 million
- 2021–22: ▲1.063 million
- 2022–23: ▲1.159 million
- 2023–24: ▲1.371 million
- 2024–25: ▲1.426 million

Key dates
- 1868: Opened

Other information
- External links: Departures; Facilities
- Coordinates: 51.5638°N 0.1298°W

Upper Holloway is a station on the Suffragette line of the London Overground in Holloway, north London. It is 3 miles 0 chains (4.8 km) from St Pancras (measured via Kentish Town and Mortimer Street Junction) and is situated between Gospel Oak and Crouch Hill. The current level of service is one train every 15 minutes in each direction except late evenings when it is half-hourly. The line is now electrified, and services are operated by 4 car Class 710 EMUs.

The station is a short walk along Holloway Road from Archway on the Northern line. This is currently the most convenient interchange between the two lines, given as 490 yards (450 m) on the tube map and maps inside London Overground trains.

== Connections ==
London Buses routes 17, 43, 263, 310 and night routes N41 and N263 serve the station.

== Design ==
Station facilities are basic with little at street level other than a few signs to indicate the presence of a station. Holloway Road passes over the line and steps and ramps for wheelchair users, buggies, bikes etc. on either side of the bridge lead directly down to the platforms. There are information points, CCTV cameras, information screens and loudspeakers. There are brick-built shelters on each platform and the station staff operate out of a small portable office.

Signs of the station's past remain. The building which used to be the ticket office can be seen beside the south entrance (for trains towards Gospel Oak). A footbridge over the track remains, though this is closed and the only way over the track is via Holloway Road. The platforms were originally built to accommodate longer trains; the unused sections of platform remain, but are closed and in a poor state of repair. The signal box at the end of the platform is still in use.

In summer 2008, the station was repainted and re-signed in London Overground colours, with the green-painted staircase railings (for example) of the former Silverlink franchise giving way to Overground orange.

The station was formerly located between Junction Road and Hornsey Road station, which both closed in 1943. The cause of the closures was in part related to their close proximity to Upper Holloway station.

The station is in London fare zone 2.

== Services ==
All services at Upper Holloway are operated by London Overground using Class 710 EMUs.

The typical off-peak service is four trains per hour in each direction between Gospel Oak and Barking Riverside. During the late evenings, the service is reduced to three trains per hour in each direction.

Preceding station	London Overground	Following station
Gospel Oak Terminus	Suffragette line Gospel Oak to Barking line	Crouch Hill towards Barking Riverside
	Disused railways	
Junction Road	Tottenham and Hampstead Junction Railway	Hornsey Road
