= James Jermyn =

New Zealand Anglican clergy

James Alexander Jermyn was an Anglican priest in the first half of the Twentieth century.

Jermyn was educated at the University of New Zealand and ordained deacon in 1915, and priest in 1916. After a curacy in Karamea he was a Chaplain with the New Zealand Military Forces during the First World War. When peace returned he was a curate at Holy Trinity, Stroud Green. He held incumbencies at Murchison, Westport and Greymouth. He was Archdeacon of Māwhera from 1930 to 1940.
