= Hornsey railway station =

Railway station in London

Hornsey
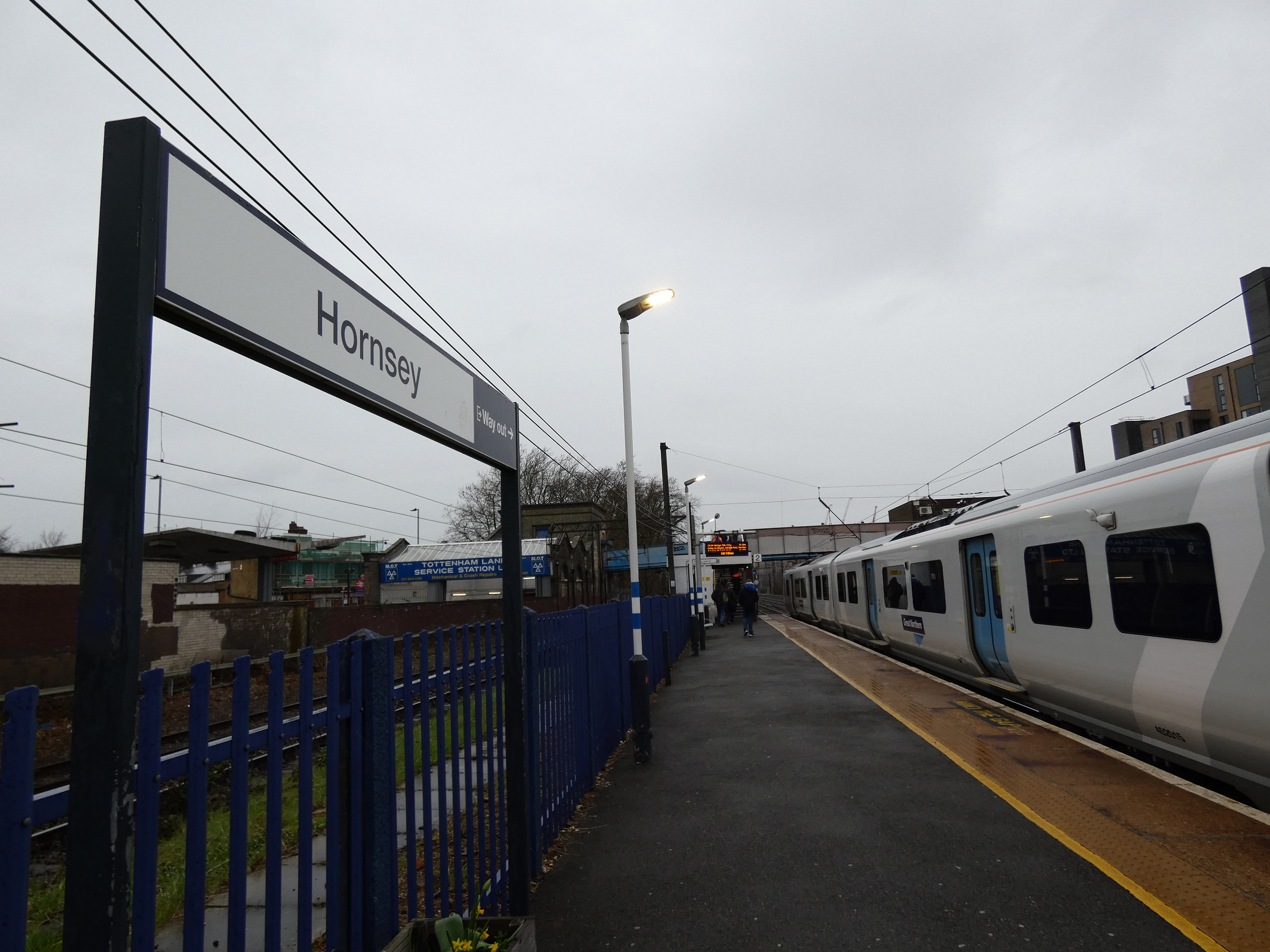
- The southbound platform of the station and adjacent TMD.
- Interactive map of Hornsey

General information
- Location: Hornsey
- Local authority: London Borough of Haringey
- Managed by: Great Northern
- Station code: HRN
- DfT category: D
- Number of platforms: 2
- Fare zone: 3

National Rail annual entry and exit
- 2020–21: ▼0.430 million
- 2021–22: ▲0.991 million
- 2022–23: ▲1.315 million
- 2023–24: ▲1.500 million
- 2024–25: ▲1.665 million

Key dates
- 1850: Opened

Other information
- External links: Departures; Facilities
- Coordinates: 51.5862°N 0.1116°W

Hornsey railway station is in Hornsey in the London Borough of Haringey, north London. It is on the Great Northern route that forms part of the East Coast Main Line, 4 miles 4 chains (6.5 km) down the line from London King's Cross, and is situated between Harringay to the south and Alexandra Palace to the north.

It is in London fare zone 3. The station is managed by Great Northern on behalf of Network Rail, and is adjacent to the Hornsey train maintenance depot. It was built in 1850 on the Great Northern Railway.

== History ==
The station was opened on 7 August 1850 by the Great Northern Railway (GNR), the same day that the main line between Peterborough and London (Maiden Lane) was opened. It was the first station on the line after King's Cross. Later in the century, maintenance sidings were established on both the up and down sides.

Under plans approved in 1897, the station was to be served by the Great Northern and Strand Railway (GN&SR), a tube railway supported by the GNR which would have run underground beneath the GNR's tracks from Alexandra Palace to Finsbury Park and then into central London. The GN&SR stations on each side would have been the same as the main line stations. The GN&SR route and stations north of Finsbury Park were cancelled in 1902 when the GN&SR was taken over by Charles Yerkes' consortium which planned to merge it with the Brompton and Piccadilly Circus Railway to form the Great Northern, Piccadilly and Brompton Railway from Finsbury Park to Hammersmith (now part of the London Underground's Piccadilly line).

== Service ==
All services at Hornsey are operated by Great Northern using Class 717 EMUs.

The typical off-peak service in trains per hour is:

- 4 tph to Moorgate
- 2 tph to Stevenage via Hertford North
- 2 tph to Welwyn Garden City

During weekday peak hours, the station is served by an additional half-hourly service between Moorgate and Hertford North, and the service between Moorgate and Welwyn Garden City is increased to 4 tph. The station is also served by a small number of peak-hour services between Moorgate and Gordon Hill.

Preceding station	National Rail	Following station
Harringay	Great Northern Great Northern Route Stopping Services	Alexandra Palace
	Abandoned Plans	
Preceding station	LUL	Following station
Harringay towards Strand	Great Northern & Strand	Alexandra Palace; Terminus

== Connections ==
- Turnpike Lane London Underground station is a 15-minute walk away.
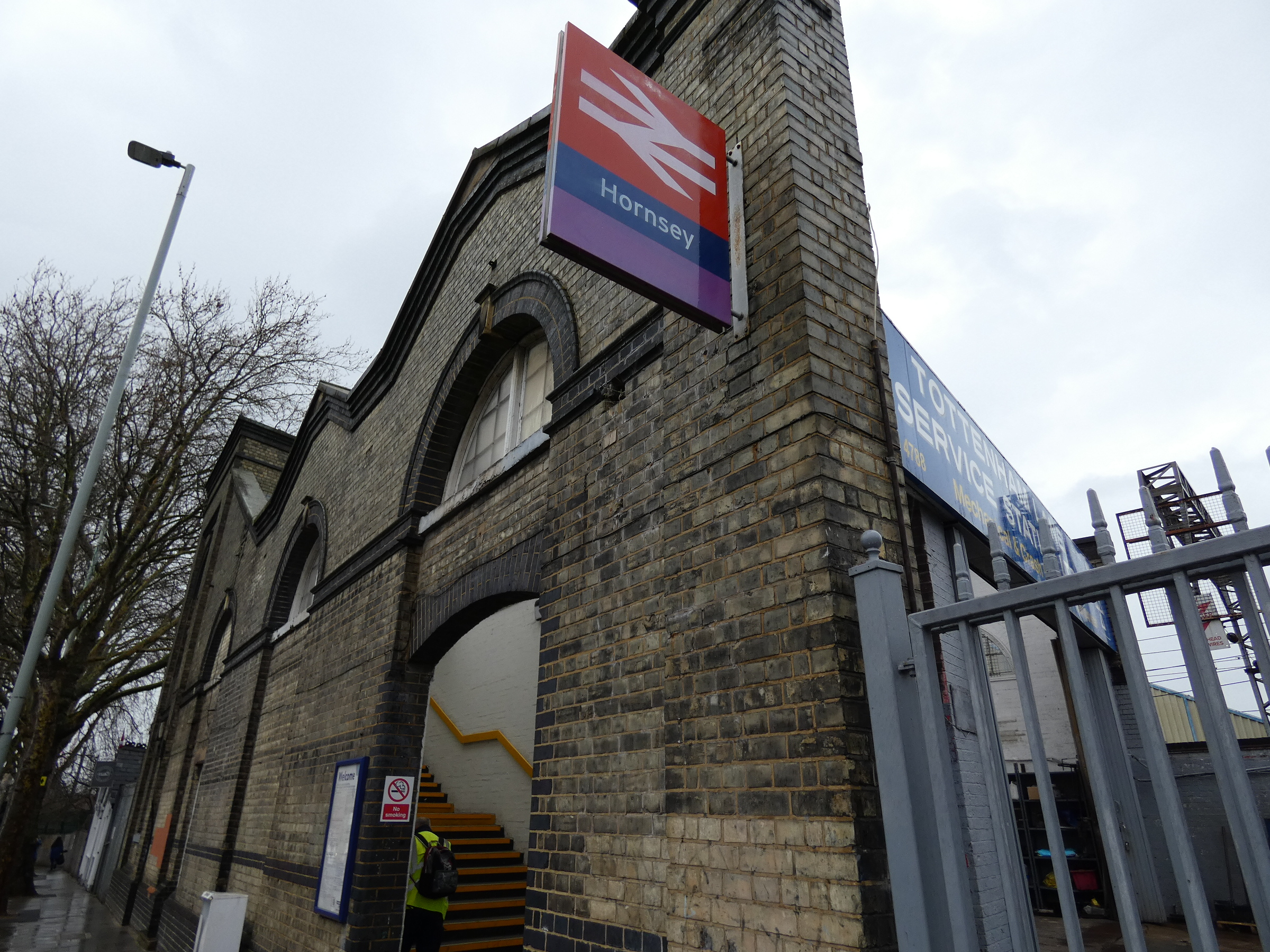
- The Tottenham Lane entrance to Hornsey Station
  London Buses route 41 and night routes N41 and N91 serve the station.
- A change to an adjacent platform at Finsbury Park station two stops away from Hornsey on the railway gives direct access on the overground lines to and from central London, south London, Gatwick and Brighton.
