= Hornsey Road railway station =

Former railway station in England

Coordinates: 51.5678°N 0.1239°W

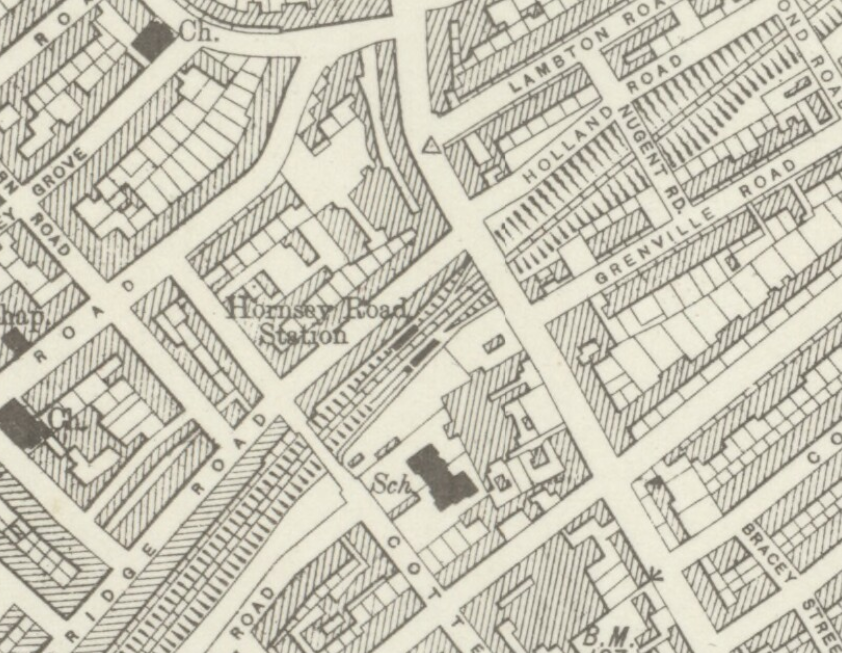
Hornsey Road station on a 1920 map

Hornsey Road railway station was a station on Hornsey Road, near Finsbury Park, in the London Borough of Islington, which was opened in 1872 by the Tottenham and Hampstead Junction Railway. It was between Upper Holloway and Crouch Hill stations, on the line now known as the Gospel Oak to Barking line. It was closed in 1943, and demolished soon afterwards. Its closure was due to wartime constraints and its proximity to the neighbouring stations.

Preceding station	Disused railways	Following station
Upper Holloway	Tottenham and Hampstead Junction Railway	Crouch Hill
