= Killing of Jonathan Zito =

1992 fatal stabbing in London, England

- Location: Finsbury Park station, London, England
- Date: 17 December 1992; 33 years ago
- Attack type: Homicide by stabbing
- Deaths: 1
- Victim: Jonathan Zito
- Perpetrator: Christopher Clunis

On 17 December 1992, Christopher Clunis stabbed Jonathan Zito to death at Finsbury Park station, London, England.

== Christopher Clunis ==
Christopher Clunis was born on 18 May 1963 in Jamaica. He was treated as an inpatient at Jamaica's Bellevue Hospital in 1986. Soon thereafter, Clunis moved to London, where from 1986 to 1992 he received psychiatric treatment at several hospitals.

== Killing ==
At between 3:00 and 4:00 p.m. on 17 December 1992, in Finsbury Park Underground station in North London, England, Clunis used a knife to stab 27-year-old Jonathan Zito, who was a stranger to Clunis, three times in the face. Zito was taken to Whittington Hospital, where he died two hours later. The fatal wound pierced his right upper eyelid and brain.

== Proceedings ==
Clunis was arrested and taken to Holloway Road police station. At 3:45 p.m. on 18 December, he was charged with murder. On 28 June 1993 at the Old Bailey, he admitted manslaughter on the grounds of diminished responsibility. He was ordered to be detained indefinitely in Rampton, a secure hospital in Nottingham.

== Reaction ==
The killing received a great deal of coverage in the British mainstream media as well as in scholarly publications, including controversy in regard to the inadequate psychiatric healthcare given to Clunis, a diagnosed paranoid schizophrenic.
