= Harringay railway station =

Railway station in London

Harringay
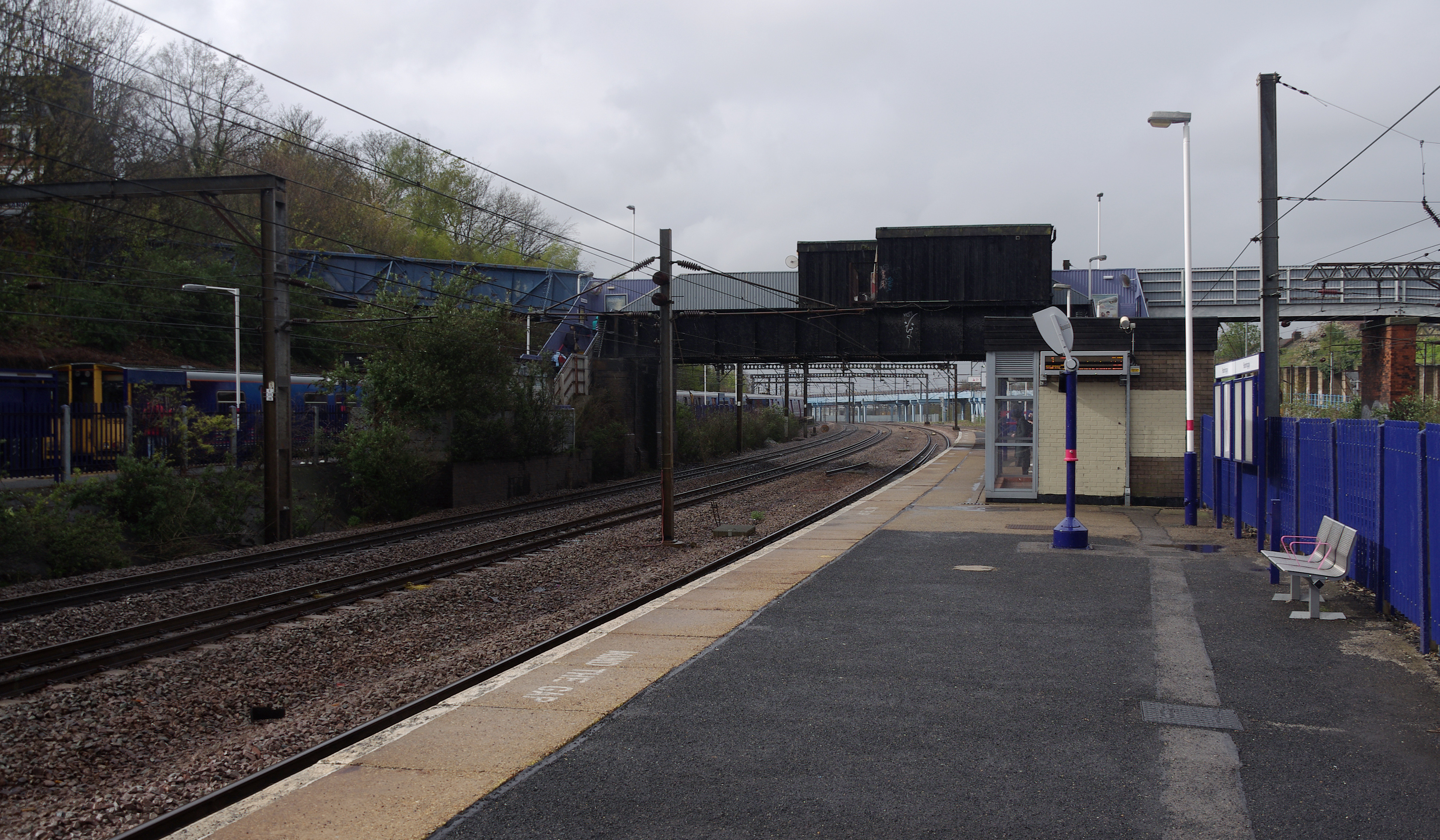
- Interactive map of Harringay

General information
- Location: Harringay
- Local authority: London Borough of Haringey
- Managed by: Great Northern
- Owner: Network Rail
- Station code: HGY
- DfT category: D
- Number of platforms: 2
- Fare zone: 3
- OSI: Harringay Green Lanes

National Rail annual entry and exit
- 2020–21: ▼0.287 million
- 2021–22: ▲0.677 million
- 2022–23: ▲0.921 million
- 2023–24: ▲1.034 million
- 2024–25: ▲1.140 million

Key dates
- 1 May 1885: Opened

Other information
- External links: Departures; Facilities
- Coordinates: 51.577°N 0.1052°W

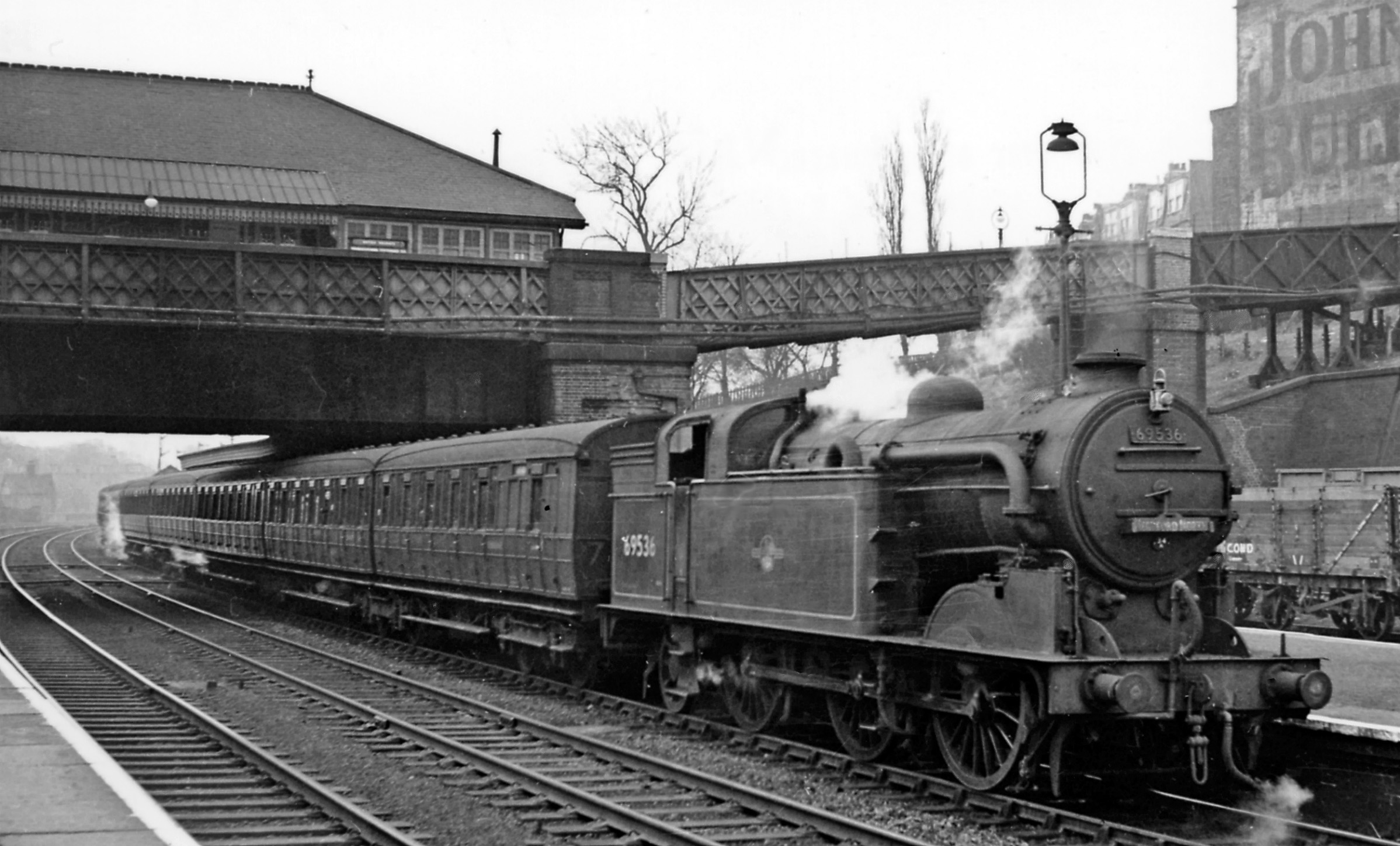
Down local train in 1958

Harringay railway station is in Harringay in the London Borough of Haringey, north London. It is on the Great Northern route that forms part of the East Coast Main Line, 3 miles 32 chains (5.5 km) down the line from London King's Cross, and is situated between Finsbury Park to the south and Hornsey to the north. It opened on 1 May 1885.

Harringay is managed and served by Great Northern. It is a short distance from Harringay Green Lanes railway station on the London Overground network.

== History ==
A formal agreement to build a station at Harringay was made between the British Land Company and the Great Northern Railway in April 1884. The Land Company needed the station to serve housing it was building to the east of the railway line on the site of Harringay House, so it contributed £3,500 to the cost and agreed to bear the working costs of the station for an initial period. Contracts to build the station (including the footbridge) and a road bridge over the Tottenham & Hampstead line went to S.W. Pattinson of Ruskington for £8,000 and £3,999 respectively in August the same year.

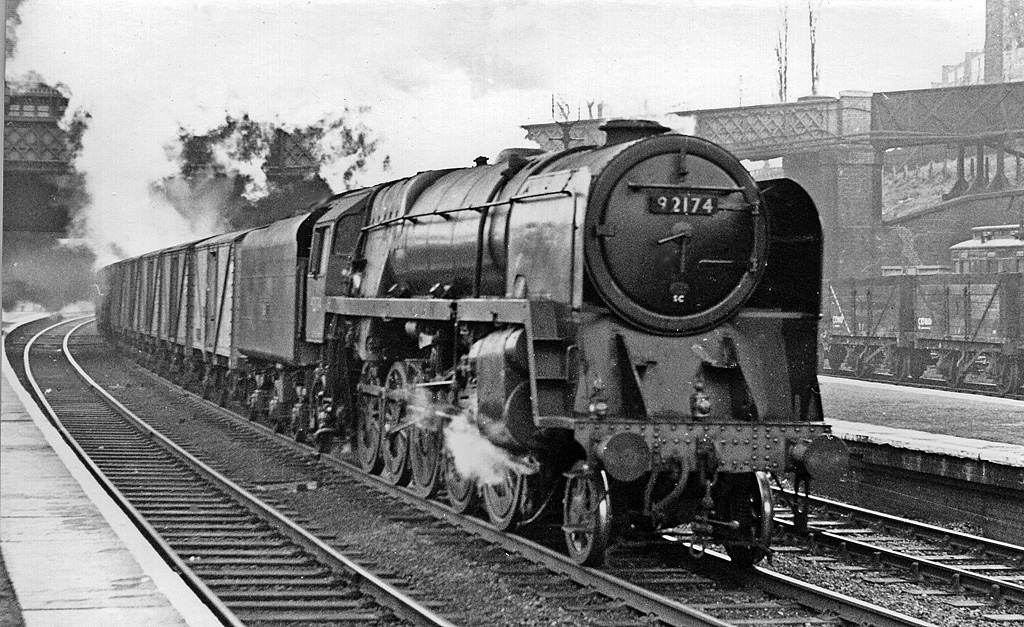
Down 'Blue Spot' fish empties passing in 1958

The station was constructed with an up platform as an island serving the up main and up slow, and a single-sided down platform serving the down slow only. A 300-foot-long footbridge (91 m) was constructed to give access to the station. It stretched from a station approach road off Wightman Road to the west side of the cutting, where Quernmore Road would eventually be built some fifteen years later. A booking office was built on the footbridge above the platforms.

The station opened to passenger traffic on 1 May 1885 with a staff complement of a station master, two assistant clerks, two ticket collectors, and three porters. Although it had been agreed that the station would be named Harringay Park, the GNR public timetable from May 1885 shows that station was in fact named Harringay from the outset. A goods yard was built to the east of the line, but the exact date it opened for public traffic is not recorded.

In 1900 a second down slow passenger line was added and the down platform was made an island and widened along its entire length.

The 1885 booking office building suffered fire damage in the 1960s and had been almost entirely removed by 1969. It was replaced by a small timber shack, which serves as a ticket office until August 2021. Shortly thereafter it was demolished. Tickets sales are now by machine only.

The station was renamed Harringay West on 18 June 1951, but reverted to Harringay on 27 May 1971.

In 1975 the platform layout was altered with the west sides of both acting as single sided platforms. A replacement waiting room/canopy block was provided on each.

Since 1976 under British Rail only the central part of the footbridge, and the girders built to carry the old booking office building, remain from the 1885 station structure.

Under plans approved in 1897, the station was to be served by the Great Northern and Strand Railway (GN&SR), a tube railway supported by the GNR which would have run underground beneath the GNR's tracks from Alexandra Palace to Finsbury Park and then into central London. The GN&SR stations on each side would have been the same as the main line stations. The GN&SR route and stations north of Finsbury Park were cancelled in 1902 when the GN&SR was taken over by Charles Yerkes' consortium, which planned to merge it with the Brompton & Piccadilly Circus Railway to form the Great Northern, Piccadilly and Brompton Railway from Finsbury Park to Hammersmith (now part of the London Underground's Piccadilly line).

== Services ==
All services at Harringay are operated by Great Northern using Class 717 EMUs.

The typical off-peak service in trains per hour is:

- 4 tph to Moorgate
- 2 tph to Stevenage via Hertford North
- 2 tph to Welwyn Garden City

During the weekday peak hours, the station is served by an additional half-hourly service between Moorgate and Hertford North, and the service between Moorgate and Welwyn Garden City is increased to 4 tph. The station is also served by a small number of peak-hour services between Moorgate and Gordon Hill.

Preceding station	National Rail	Following station
Finsbury Park	Great Northern Great Northern Route Stopping Services	Hornsey
Abandoned plans
Preceding station	London Underground	Following station
Finsbury Park towards Strand	Great Northern & Strand	Hornsey towards Wood Green

== Connections ==
London Buses route W5 serves the station.

== Infrastructure ==
Trains calling at Harringay use the low-speed rail tracks in front of the platforms; there are five more tracks passing through and around the vicinity of the station. Two of these are used for high-speed London North Eastern Railway, Hull Trains, Grand Central and other Great Northern services, and the other three are used for freight services. Occasionally, when these lines are busy, the low-speed tracks are used for the faster services.

A rail link between the East Coast Main Line and the Gospel Oak to Barking line branches off from the former at the southern end of the station.

During the week, trains use dual-voltage Class 717 EMUs following the withdrawal of Class 313 EMUs.

== In popular culture ==
A supersized ticket stub, featuring the words 'Harringay West' (and Kings Cross), features prominently in the background of a promotional film of The Beatles' Ticket To Ride, filmed on 23 November 1965 at Twickenham Film Studios.

The station is used as a location in the 2009 film London River.
