= Finsbury Park station =

London Underground and railway station

Finsbury Park
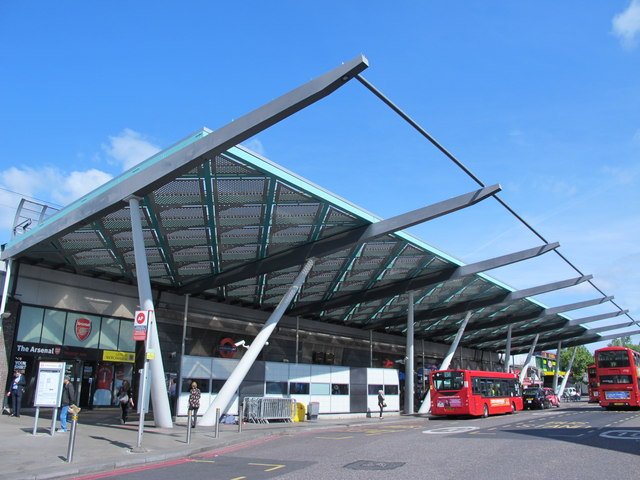
- The station entrance in 2015
- Interactive map of Finsbury Park

General information
- Location: Finsbury Park
- Local authority: London Borough of Islington
- Managed by: Great Northern; London Underground
- Station code: FPK
- DfT category: C2
- Number of platforms: 12 (8 National Rail, 4 Underground)
- Accessible: Yes
- Fare zone: 2

London Underground annual entry and exit
- 2021: ▼14.05 million
- 2022: ▲23.40 million
- 2023: ▼20.48 million
- 2024: ▼20.33 million
- 2025: ▲20.98 million

National Rail annual entry and exit
- 2020–21: ▼2.014 million
- Interchange: ▼0.669 million
- 2021–22: ▲4.600 million
- Interchange: ▲1.901 million
- 2022–23: ▲8.559 million
- Interchange: ▲3.360 million
- 2023–24: ▲9.364 million
- Interchange: ▼2.134 million
- 2024–25: ▲11.176 million
- Interchange: ▲2.203 million

Railway companies
- Original company: Great Northern Railway
- Pre-grouping: Great Northern Railway
- Post-grouping: London and North Eastern Railway

Key dates
- 1850: Tracks laid
- 1 July 1861: Opened (GNR)
- 22 August 1867: Opened (Edgware branch)
- 14 February 1904: Opened (GN&CR))
- 15 December 1906: Opened as terminus (GNP&BR)
- 19 September 1932: Became through station (Piccadilly)
- 1954: Closed (Edgware branch, passengers)
- 3 October 1964: Closed (Northern City Line)
- 1 September 1968: Opened (Victoria)
- September 1970: Closed (Edgware branch)
- 8 November 1976: Opened (Northern City Line)

Other information
- External links: TfL station info page; Departures; Facilities
- Coordinates: 51.564653°N 0.106366°W

Finsbury Park (/ˈfɪnzbri ˈpɑːk/) is an intermodal interchange station in North London for London Underground, National Rail and London Buses services. The station, which is in London fare zone 2, is the third busiest Underground station outside zone 1, with over 33 million passengers using the station in 2019.

== Name and location ==
The station is named after the nearby Finsbury Park, one of the oldest of London's Victorian parks, opening in 1869.

The interchange consists of a National Rail station, a London Underground station and two bus stations, all interconnected. The main entrances are by the eastern bus station on Station Place. The National Rail ticket office here lies between one entrance marked by the Underground roundel symbol and the other which is marked by the National Rail symbol; the latter provides direct access to the main line platforms. A new, larger western entrance by Wells Terrace and Goodwin Place opened in December 2019, as part of the upgrade of the station. There is also a narrow side entrance to the south on the A503 Seven Sisters Road (open during peak times only). The complex is located in London fare zone 2.

Day and nighttime London Buses serve the station.

== History ==
Finsbury Park is on the route of the East Coast Main Line from King's Cross to the north of England and Scotland. The southern section of this was built in stages during the 1840s and early 1850s by the Great Northern Railway (GNR). Tracks were first laid through Finsbury Park in 1850 to the GNR's temporary terminus at Maiden Lane just north of the permanent terminus at King's Cross (which opened in 1852). The first station at Finsbury Park opened on 1 July 1861 and was originally named Seven Sisters Road (Holloway).

Soon after the first station opened, the Edgware, Highgate and London Railway (EH&LR) began construction of a line from Finsbury Park to Edgware. The GNR took over the EH&LR shortly before its opening on 22 August 1867. The station was given its current name Finsbury Park on 15 November 1869. The Edgware branch platforms were on each side of the main tracks. The southbound ("up") track of the branch crossed over the main line by a bridge on its way into the station.

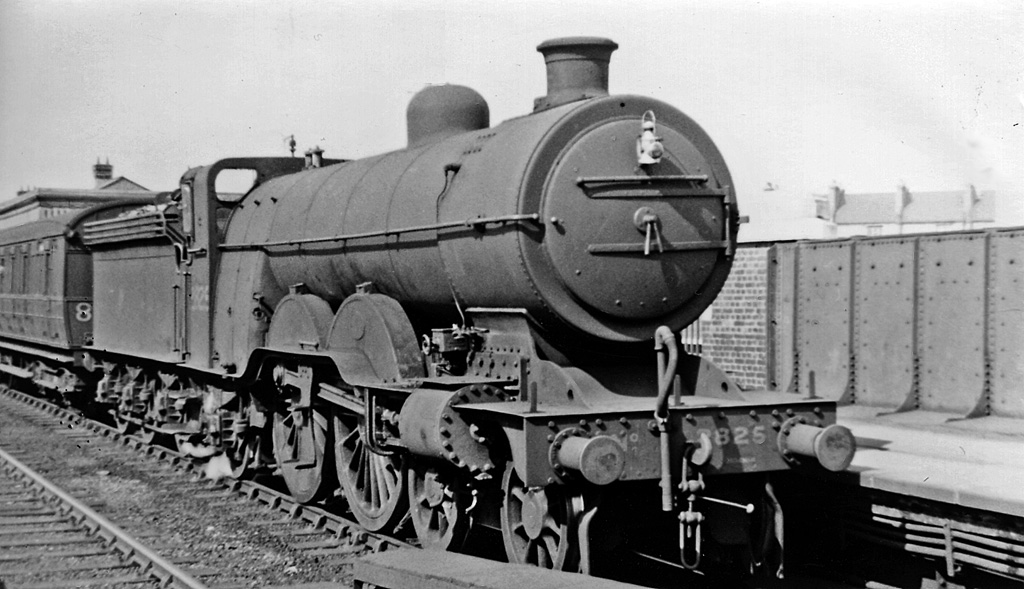
LNER Ivatt Atlantic at Finsbury Park in 1946

The Great Northern & City Railway (GN&CR) was an underground railway planned to provide a tunnel link between Finsbury Park and Moorgate in the City of London as an alternative London terminus for GNR trains. The tunnels were constructed with a large diameter to accommodate this service but a dispute between the two companies prevented the GN&CR connecting its tunnels to the GNR platforms. The GN&CR tunnels, instead, terminated beneath the main line station without a connection to the surface and the line operated as a shuttle between Finsbury Park and Moorgate. The line opened on 14 February 1904 and on 1 September 1913, it was taken over by the Metropolitan Railway.

The Great Northern, Piccadilly and Brompton Railway (GNP&BR) (now London Underground's Piccadilly line) opened on 15 December 1906 by David Lloyd George, then President of the Board of Trade, between Finsbury Park and Hammersmith in west London. The tube railway originated as the Great Northern and Strand Railway (GN&SR) in 1899 and was initially supported by the GNR as a means of relieving congestion on its main line into King's Cross by constructing a tube line under the GNR's tracks from Alexandra Palace to King's Cross and then to the Strand. The GN&SR was taken over in 1901 by a consortium led by Charles Yerkes before any work had been carried out and the section north of Finsbury Park was cancelled. The GN&SR was merged with the Brompton and Piccadilly Circus Railway to form the GNP&BR. It was constructed with the smaller-diameter tube tunnels common to other underground railways being constructed in London at that time. Its platforms were constructed by the GNR parallel with the GN&CR's platforms beneath the main line station.

=== Construction of Piccadilly line and Northern Heights plan ===
The transport interchange at Finsbury Park had long been recognised as a severe bottle-neck for passengers heading north from central London and calls had been regularly made to improve the situation by extending northwards one of the two underground lines serving the station. Until the mid-1920s this had been resisted by the GNR and its successor the LNER as a threat to its suburban passenger traffic, but mounting pressure finally forced the LNER to relinquish its veto and lift its objections to the Underground making an extension.

With financial support from the government, the Underground began construction of an extension of the Piccadilly line northwards to Cockfosters and the first section, to Arnos Grove, opened on 19 September 1932. The route was opened fully on 31 July 1933.

By 1935 the GNR had become part of the London and North Eastern Railway (LNER). In 1935 London Underground announced its New Works Programme. This included plans to take over the steam-operated LNER branch lines from Finsbury Park to Edgware, High Barnet and Alexandra Palace – collectively known as the "Northern Heights" lines. These routes were to be joined to the Northern City Line by the construction of new tracks from Drayton Park to the surface at Finsbury Park as had originally been intended by the GN&CR. Trains would then have been able to run from any of the three LNER termini to Moorgate. The Northern City Line tunnels from Drayton Park to Finsbury Park would have been taken out of use. A separate connection between Archway Underground station (then named Highgate) and East Finchley station was also planned, including a new Underground station below the then-existing surface station at Highgate.

In early 1939 London Underground announced that the Drayton Park to Alexandra Palace route would begin operation in autumn 1940 and the branch was transferred to the control of the Northern line. The start of the Second World War caused the postponement and eventual cancellation of this and much of the other plans, leaving operations at Finsbury Park unchanged. The surface connection between Drayton Park and Finsbury Park was abandoned and the Northern City Line continued to run between Moorgate and Finsbury Park in tunnel. Traffic on the Highgate and Alexandra Palace branch diminished and it was closed to passengers in 1954 although it was retained for freight to Edgware and stock movements to Highgate Depot.

=== Construction of Victoria line ===
London Underground had for many years been planning a new route across central London to relieve pressure on the central sections of the Piccadilly and Northern lines. In the early 1960s the plans were consolidated into a single plan for the Victoria line. The route of the new line was designed to provide the maximum number of interchanges with other Underground and British Rail lines as possible, and Finsbury Park was an ideal candidate for this. The plan called for the reconfiguration of the four underground platforms used by the Northern City Line and the Piccadilly line. To allow the construction works necessary for the provision of cross-platform interchanges between the Piccadilly and the Victoria lines the Northern City service to Finsbury Park was ended on 3 October 1964. After this date trains from Moorgate ran only as far as Drayton Park.

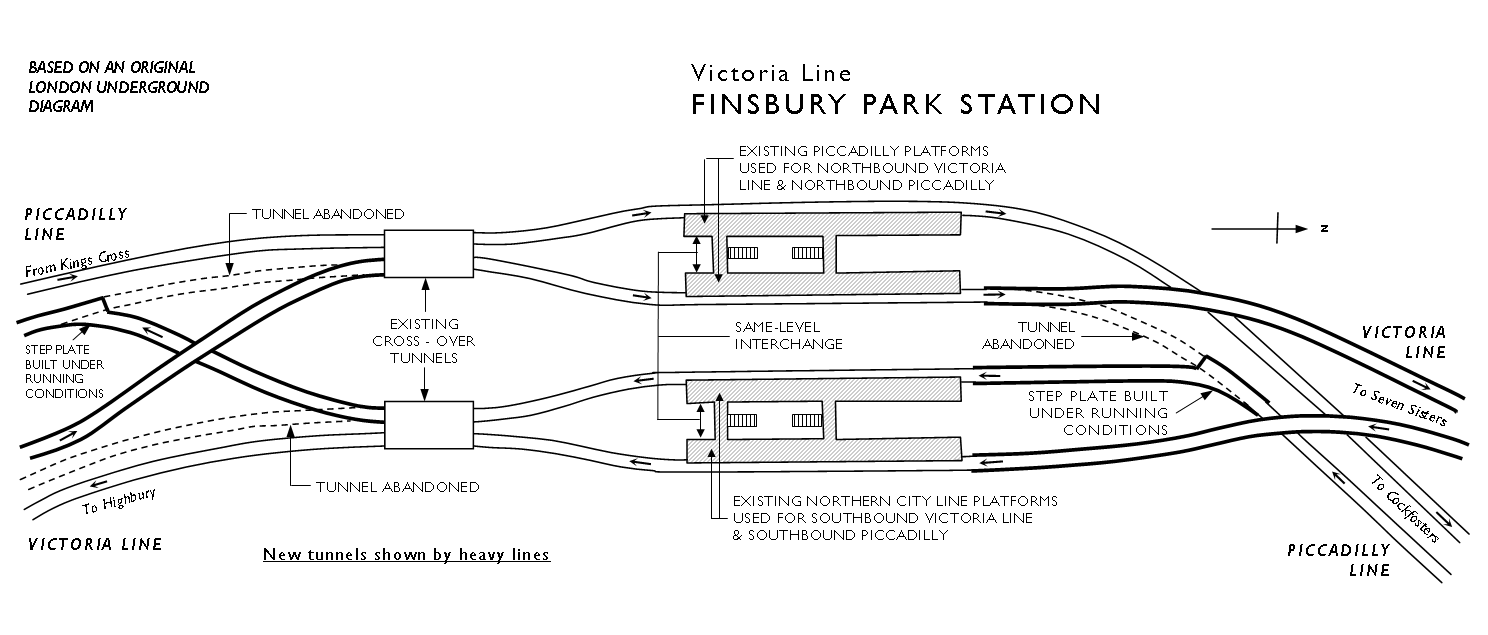
Reconfiguration of the below ground platforms at Finsbury Park

The Northern City platforms became the southbound platforms for both the Piccadilly and Victoria lines which were connected to the previously dead-end tunnels to the north of the platforms. The old southbound Piccadilly line platform then became the Victoria line northbound platform, with the northbound Piccadilly line platform unchanged. New connecting tunnels were constructed. There are cross-over connections between each pair of northbound and southbound tunnels to enable stock transfers, given that the Victoria line is otherwise completely self-contained.

The first section of the Victoria line, including Finsbury Park, opened between Walthamstow Central and Highbury & Islington on 1 September 1968. When the Victoria line was built in the 1960s, the walls in Finsbury Park station were decorated with mosaics of duelling pistols, which can still be seen. This was based on a mistaken identification of Finsbury Park with Finsbury Fields, which was used by Londoners since medieval times for archery and sports, and also associated with 18th-century duels and one of the first hot air balloon flights. Finsbury Fields was close to the present-day Finsbury Square, 3 miles (5 km) south. At the same time the long entrance subways and the Wells Terrace booking hall (at the bus station end) were rebuilt to a high standard.

=== Northern City Line modifications ===
London Underground continued to use the Edgware branch occasionally for stock movements between its depot at Highgate and Finsbury Park until September 1970. The tracks were removed in 1971 and the platforms at Finsbury Park which served this line were demolished; their location is now the pedestrian access to the eastern station entrance. The bridge over Stroud Green Road which carried the tracks was removed. The abutment walls remain.

In 1976, part of the abandoned Northern Heights plan was completed in reverse. The Northern City Line, which had originally run to the underground part of the station, was transferred from London Underground to British Rail. An unfinished surface connection between Drayton Park and Finsbury Park begun as part of the "Northern Heights" project was completed to make it possible to bring trains to the surface at Finsbury Park and run through trains from Moorgate on to the north. The service commenced operation on 8 November 1976.

=== Station upgrades ===
In the late 2010s, the station was upgraded and refurbished throughout, including the provision of step free access, ticket barriers and a new, larger western entrance to the bus station, Goodwin Street and Wells Terrace.

Step free access to both the Piccadilly and Victoria lines, as well as to platforms 1&2 and 5&6 of the National Rail station was completed in January 2019. The new western entrance was constructed in collaboration with Telford Homes, the developer of "City North" - a residential and commercial development adjacent to the station. This new, larger entrance opened in December 2019, replacing an older entrance constructed in the 1970s, which closed in July 2016 as part of the City North development works. A project to make the remaining platforms (3, 4, 7 & 8) step-free began in July 2021 and was completed in April 2023.

== Accidents and incidents ==
On 9 November 1959, a freight train ran away and collided with an empty coaching-stock train. The collision occurred on a bridge over a road, severely damaging the bridge.

On 8 May 1974, musician Graham Bond died after getting run over by a Piccadilly line train at the station.

On 17 December 1992, Jonathan Zito was stabbed to death in the station.

== National Rail services ==
=== Existing services ===
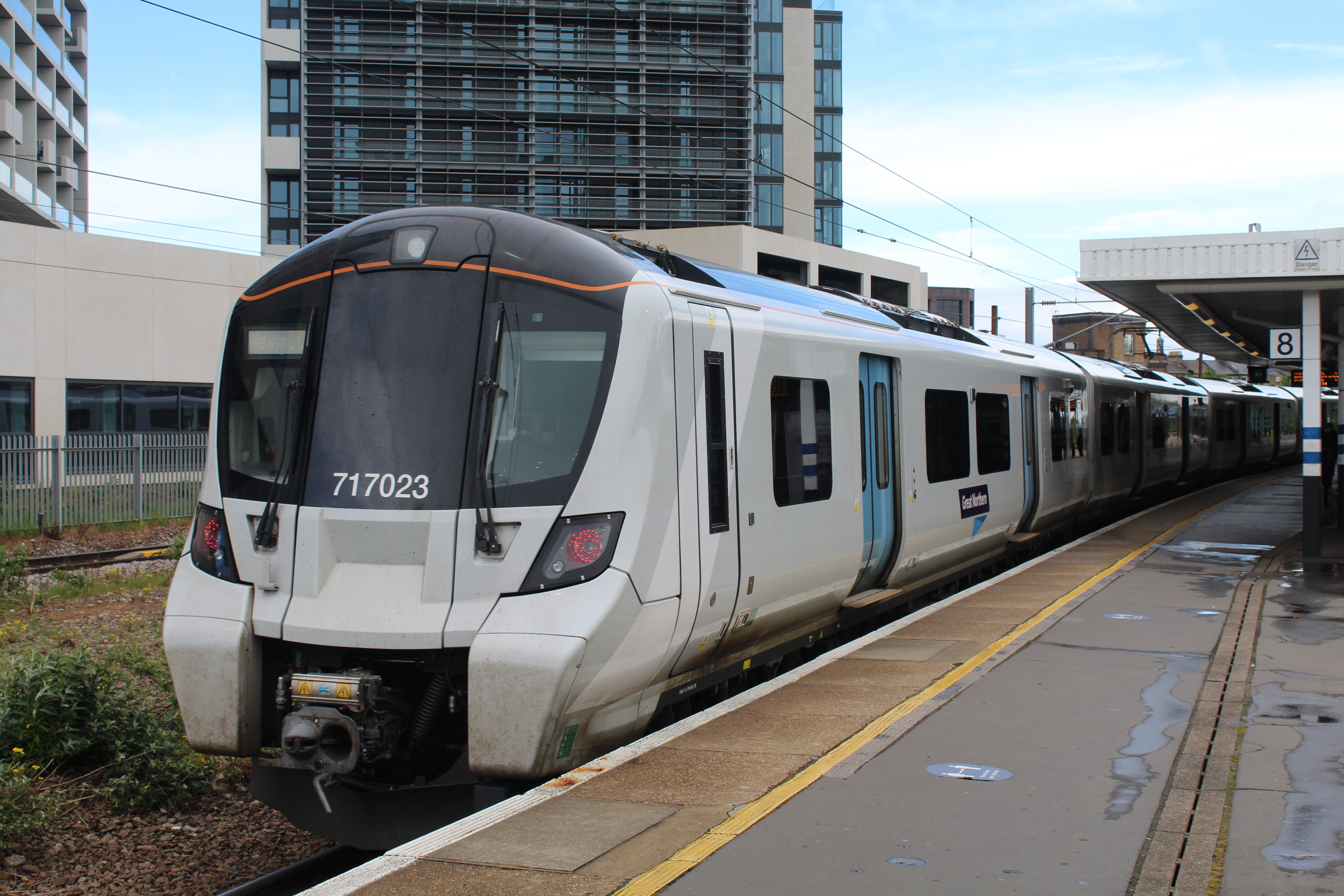
Great Northern Class 717 service at Finsbury Park

The above-ground National Rail station, which has a separate ticket office to the Underground station, is managed and served by Great Northern. Trains from Moorgate and King's Cross form inner suburban services to Stevenage via Hertford North and Welwyn Garden City and outer suburban services start from Kings Cross towards Peterborough and Cambridge. Inner suburban service formerly did not serve the Moorgate branch at night and at weekends, being diverted to London Kings Cross instead. There are currently six platforms but only five tracks, as platforms 6 and 7 share a track (though platform 6 is no longer separately numbered or utilised). The platforms were renumbered on 19 May 2013 to prepare for two new up platforms, with all existing numbers increased by 2. Typically, platform 1 is used by southbound suburban services to Moorgate, platform 2 by southbound regional services to King's Cross and southbound Thameslink services, platform 7 (and occasionally also platform 5) by northbound regional services from King's Cross and northbound Thameslink Services, and platform 8 by northbound suburban services from Moorgate.

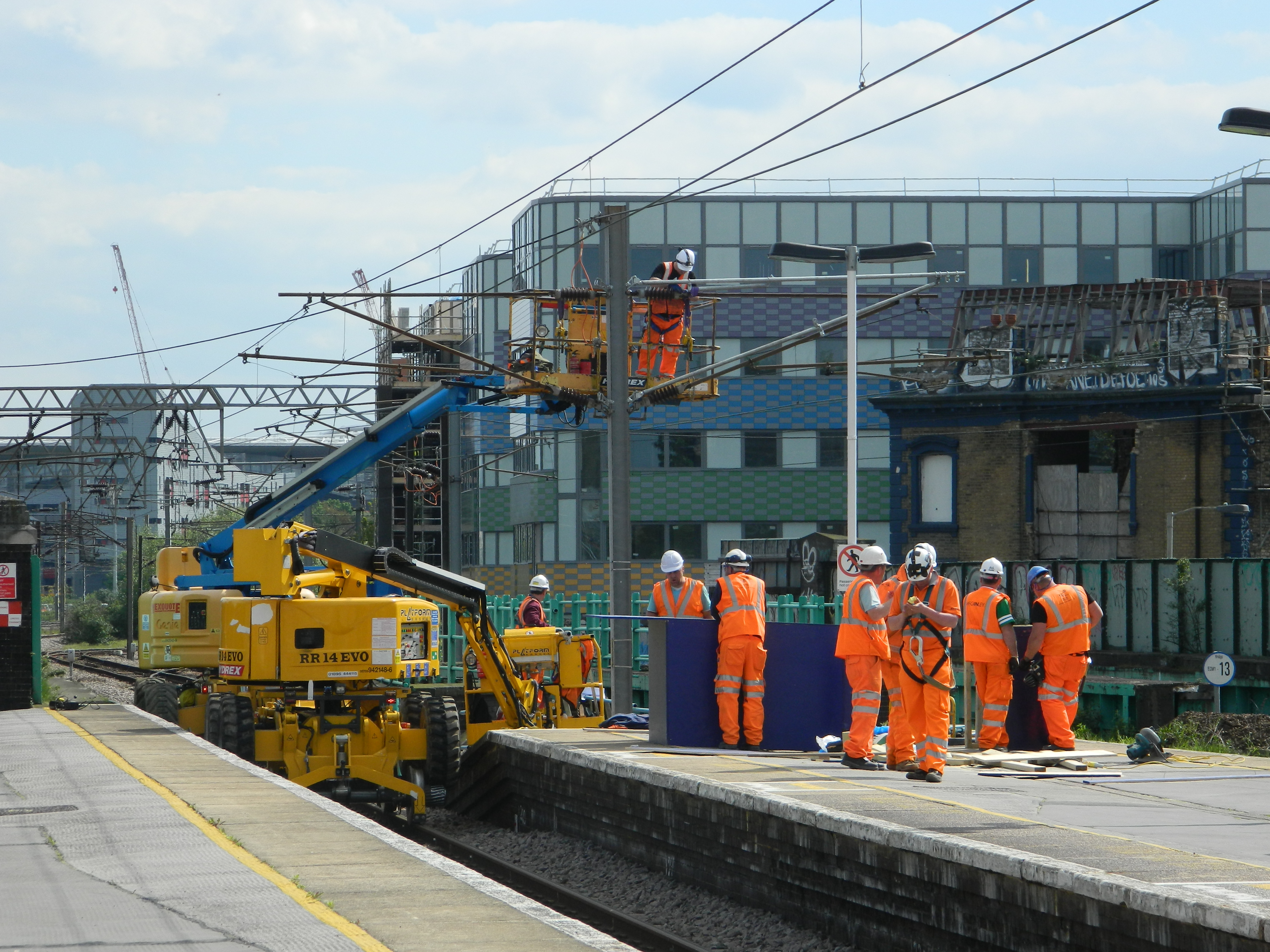
Workers testing electricity at Finsbury Park on Platform 5

=== Thameslink services ===
In 2018, as part of the Thameslink Programme, Finsbury Park was linked to the Thameslink network via a new tunnel which connects the Great Northern Route to the lines into St Pancras. This has enabled through services to run from Cambridge and Peterborough via Finsbury Park and London Bridge to Gatwick Airport, Horsham and Brighton.

Currently, not all trains labelled on the train as 'Thameslink' actually travel through the Thameslink core, as many serve King's Cross instead. During the week, and on Saturdays, there are currently four trains an hour off peak in each direction through the core to/from Finsbury Park; two between Peterborough and Horsham and two between Brighton and Cambridge. There are also an extra two trains per hour from Welwyn Garden City to Sevenoaks at peak times during the week. On Sundays, there is only one train per hour in each direction, between Brighton and Cambridge. An hourly Peterborough to King's Cross service operates instead of the Horsham service for stations north of Stevenage.

The introduction of Thameslink services at Finsbury Park was part of the Thameslink Programme, and in the connected 'RailPlan 2020' consultation, it was stated that they also planned to start a two trains per hour service from Cambridge to Maidstone East via Finsbury Park from December 2019, however this service does not yet exist.

=== New platform 1 ===
In February 2008 Network Rail published its East Coast Main Line Route Utilisation Strategy (ECMLRUS). This recommended improvements to the tracks able to carry passenger trains between Alexandra Palace Station and Finsbury Park. In March 2009 Network Rail published its CP4 Delivery Plan 2009, which involved the bringing back into service of an abandoned southbound platform; this plan was confirmed in a June 2010 update to the plan. Regular use of this new platform, Platform 1, commenced at the December 2013 timetable change. and since that date regular use of platform 3 has ceased, with platforms 1 and 2 now used instead. Since the December 2015 timetable change, the Northern City line to Moorgate operates through until end of service during the week and at weekends, rather than diverting to Kings Cross at weekends.

=== Other station facilities ===
British Transport Police maintain a presence at Finsbury Park and have a police station at the Wells Terrace entrance.

=== Service summary ===
The tables below list off-peak services in trains per hour (tph):

Southbound services:
Destination	Frequency (tph)	Operator
Moorgate	4	Great Northern
London Kings Cross	2	Great Northern
Brighton	2	Thameslink
Horsham	2	Thameslink

Northbound services:
Destination	Frequency (tph)	Operator
Stevenage (via Hertford North)	2	Great Northern
Welwyn Garden City	2	Great Northern
Letchworth (Of which one continues to Cambridge)	2	Great Northern
Cambridge (Semi-Fast)	2	Thameslink
Peterborough	2	Thameslink

Preceding station	National Rail	Following station
Drayton Park	Great Northern; Northern City Line and Kings Cross to Cambridge	Harringay
London King's Cross	Great Northern; Northern City Line and Kings Cross to Cambridge	Alexandra Palace
St Pancras International	Thameslink; Thameslink	Stevenage
St Pancras International	Thameslink; Thameslink	New Southgate
	Disused railways	
London King's Cross; Terminus	British Railways Eastern Region; Edgware, Highgate & London	Stroud Green
King's Cross Suburban (northbound)	British Rail Eastern Region; City Widened Lines	Harringay
King's Cross York Road (southbound)	British Rail Eastern Region; City Widened Lines	Harringay
	Historical railways	
Holloway and Caledonian Road; Line open, station closed	Great Northern Railway; East Coast Main Line	Harringay; Line and station open
Holloway and Caledonian Road; Line open, station closed	Great Northern Railway; East Coast Main Line	Stroud Green; Line open, station closed

== London Underground ==
The London Underground station is served by the Piccadilly and Victoria lines. Although thought of as a 'deep-level' tube station, Finsbury Park has no escalators as its lines are less than 6 m (20 ft) below street level.

Access to the Piccadilly and Victoria line platforms was previously by staircase only, reached via two narrow passages that prevented the installation of ticket barriers. As part of the upgrade of the station in the 2010s, ticket barriers were installed at both the eastern and western entrances to the station, as well as the provision of step free access throughout the station.

Preceding station	London Underground	Following station
Arsenal towards Uxbridge, Rayners Lane or Heathrow Airport (Terminal 4 or Terminal 5)	Piccadilly line	Manor House towards Cockfosters or Arnos Grove
Highbury & Islington towards Brixton	Victoria line	Seven Sisters towards Walthamstow Central
Former Service
Preceding station	London Underground	Following station
Terminus	Metropolitan line Northern City Branch (1913-39)	Drayton Park towards Moorgate
Terminus	Northern line Northern City branch (1939-64)	Drayton Park towards Moorgate
Abandoned Plans
Preceding station	London Underground	Following station
Gillespie Road towards Strand	Great Northern & Strand	Harringay towards Wood Green
Stroud Green towards Bushey Heath, High Barnet or Alexandra Palace	Northern line Northern Heights Plan	Drayton Park towards Moorgate
