= Harringay Green Lanes railway station =

London Overground station

Harringay Green Lanes
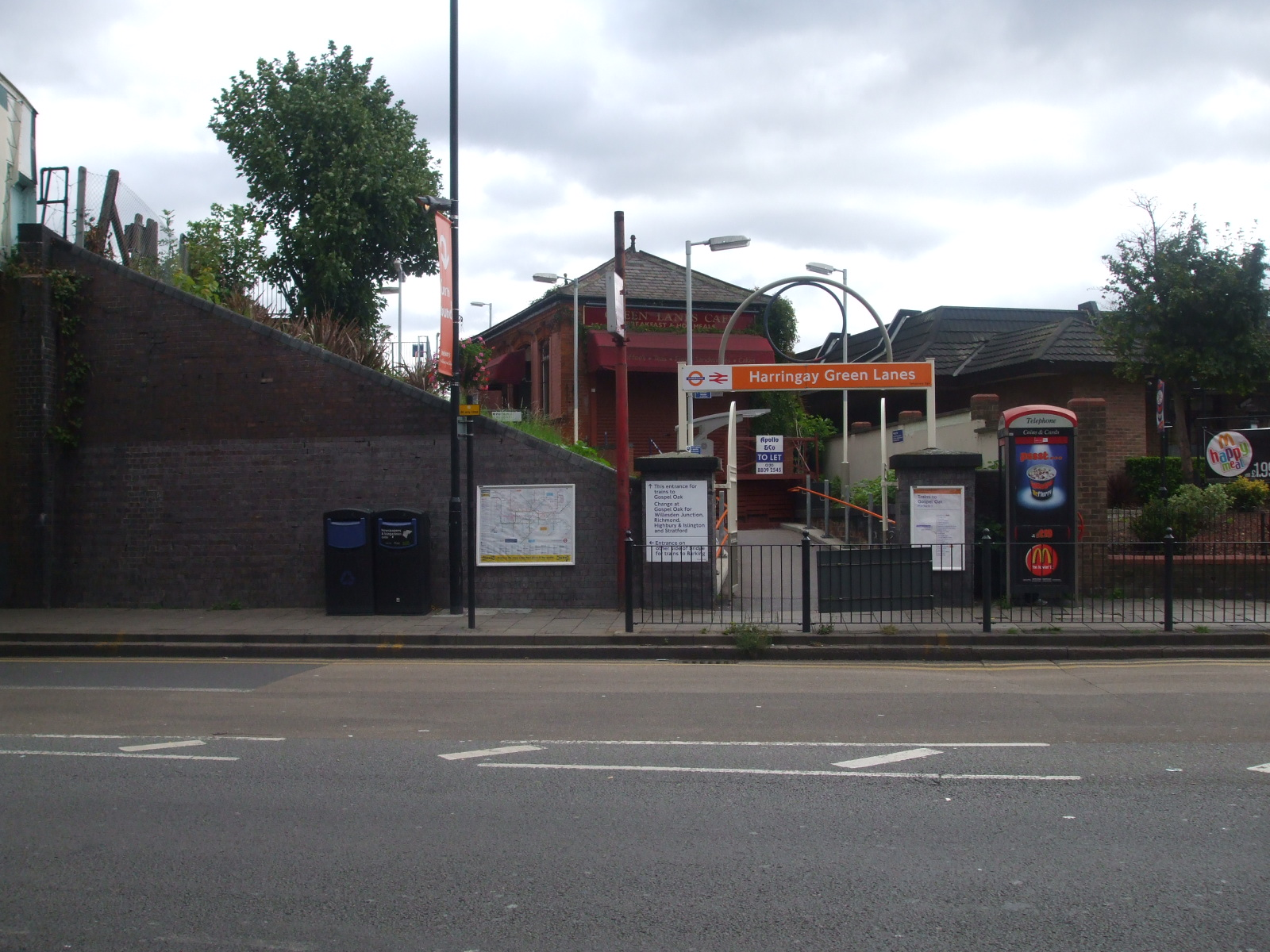
- The station
- Interactive map of Harringay Green Lanes

General information
- Location: Harringay
- Local authority: London Borough of Haringey
- Managed by: London Overground
- Owner: Network Rail
- Station code: HRY
- DfT category: E
- Number of platforms: 2
- Accessible: Yes
- Fare zone: 3
- OSI: Harringay

National Rail annual entry and exit
- 2020–21: ▼0.618 million
- 2021–22: ▲1.025 million
- 2022–23: ▲1.106 million
- 2023–24: ▲1.345 million
- 2024–25: ▲1.425 million

Key dates
- 1 June 1880: Opened

Other information
- External links: Departures; Facilities
- Coordinates: 51.5774°N 0.0977°W

Harringay Green Lanes is a station on the Suffragette line of the London Overground in Harringay, north London. It is 4 miles 61 chains (7.7 km) from St Pancras (measured via Kentish Town and Mortimer Street Junction) and is situated between Crouch Hill and South Tottenham.

== History ==
It was opened on 1 June 1880 with the name Green Lanes, but has since been renamed a number of times:

- Harringay Park, Green Lanes (1883)
- Harringay Park (18 June 1951)
- Harringay Stadium (27 October 1958)
- Harringay East (12 May 1990)
- Harringay Green Lanes (8 July 1991)

There were originally wooden platform buildings, which were replaced by brick and concrete structures in the 1950s. The original ticket office at street level survived and in recent times has been converted into a café. To cope with the huge number of passengers visiting Harringay Stadium and Arena, both right next to the station, very long platforms were provided, but these were shortened in late 2003 due to subsidence. Just west of the station was a goods yard; this closed on 3 February 1964, and the site is now occupied by Railway Fields nature reserve.

== Design ==
In summer 2008, the station was repainted and re-signed in London Overground colours, with the green-painted staircase railings (for example) of the former Silverlink franchise giving way to Overground orange. The station has step-free access from street to platform.

== Location ==
The station has no direct interchange to a tube station, despite the fact that the Piccadilly line runs directly beneath it and the distance between the two stations at either end of this section, Turnpike Lane and Manor House, is particularly long for the line. Manor House station is about 770 yards (700 m) away. Transfer on a single ticket is allowed between Harringay Green Lanes and nearby Harringay.

The station is a 0.36 mile (0.58 km) walk from Harringay railway station on the East Coast Main Line. A single track, electrified connection from the eastbound line from Gospel Oak at Harringay Park Junction to the ECML at Ferme Park sidings is located to the west of the station, but isn't used by any scheduled passenger service (only empty stock movements and occasional engineering and freight trains).

London Buses routes 29, 141, 341 and night route N29 serve the station.

== Services ==
All services at Harringay Green Lanes are operated by London Overground using Class 710 EMUs.

The typical off-peak service is four trains per hour in each direction between Gospel Oak and Barking Riverside. During the late evenings, the service is reduced to three trains per hour in each direction.

Preceding station	London Overground	Following station
Crouch Hill towards Gospel Oak	Suffragette line Gospel Oak to Barking line	South Tottenham towards Barking Riverside
	Disused railways	
Crouch Hill	Tottenham and Hampstead Junction Railway	St Ann's Road
