= List of public art in the London Borough of Haringey =

This is a list of public art in the London Borough of Haringey.

== Alexandra Park ==
Image	Title / subject	Location and coordinates	Date	Artist / designer	Type	Material	Designation	Notes
	Leo the Lion	Alexandra Park Boating Lake 51.5964°N 0.1303°W	1973	Charles Wheeler	Sculpture	Bronze	—N/a	Originally commissioned for a children's zoo at the site, which was never built.
	Olympic sculptures	The Grove, Alexandra Park 51.5922°N 0.1361°W	2012	Shane Green	Sculpture	Wood	—N/a	Part of a series of sculptures of different sports to mark the 2012 Summer Olympics.

== Crouch End ==
Image	Title / subject	Location and coordinates	Date	Artist / designer	Architect / other	Type	Designation	Notes
	Portrait roundel of Henry Reader Williams	Clock tower, Broadway 51.5798°N 0.1237°W	1895	Alfred Gilbert	Frederick Knight	Relief	Grade II	Williams (1822–1897) was a local benefactor.
	Relief panels	Broadway House, 1–4 Broadway 51.5785°N 0.1235°W	1936–1937	?	Dawe and Carter	Architectural sculpture	Grade II	
More images	Reclining Figure	Outside Hornsey Library, Haringey Park 51°34′41.3″N 0°7′20.6″W	1963–1965	T. B. Huxley-Jones		Sculpture	Grade II	
More images	The Spriggan	Parkland Walk, near site of former Crouch End railway station 51.5746°N 0.1269°W	1993	Marilyn Collins	—N/a	Sculpture	—N/a	

== Highgate ==
Highgate is partly located outside the borough of Haringey; for works not listed here see the relevant sections for the boroughs of Camden and Islington.

Image	Title / subject	Location and coordinates	Date	Artist / designer	Type	Designation	Notes
More images	Drinking fountain	Highgate Wood, Muswell Hill Road 51.5841°N 0.1489°W	1888	?	Drinking fountain	Grade II	A plaque has lines from the poet Coleridge, who had links to Highgate: "Drink, Pilgrim, here! Here rest! And if thy heart/ Be innocent, here too shalt thou refresh/ Thy spirit, listening to some gentle sound/ Of passing gale or hum of murmuring bees!"
	Highgate School War Memorial	Highgate School 51.5715°N 0.1497°W	1921	Reginald Blomfield	Cross of Sacrifice	Grade II	

== Hornsey ==
Image	Title / subject	Location and coordinates	Date	Artist / designer	Type	Designation	Notes
	Drinking fountain	High Street 51.5878°N 0.1164°W	1863	?	Drinking fountain	Grade II	
	Metcalf Fountain Charles Thomas Page Metcalf	Priory Park, Middle Lane 51.5848°N 0.1236°W	c. 1879	?	Drinking fountain	Grade II	The fountain originally stood in Crouch End Broadway; Metcalf donated it as a replacement for the village pump. It was moved here after the Broadway Clock Tower was erected on the site.
	St Paul's Fountain	Priory Park 51.5858°N 0.1230°W	1880	Francis Cranmer Penrose	Fountain	Grade II	Originally outside St Paul's Cathedral, marking the site of Paul's Cross, the foundations of which had been discovered in 1874. Moved here in the 1900s to allow for the construction of the current St Paul's Cross on the previous site.
	Drop	Philosophers' Garden, Priory Park	1990s	Marilyn Collins	Sculptural water feature	—N/a	
	Abstract sculpture	New River Avenue	c. 2008	?	Sculpture	—N/a	
	Totem 'Shapes of Thought'	Philosophers' Garden, Priory Park	2018	Elite Transformations	Sundial	—N/a	

== Muswell Hill ==
Image	Title / subject	Location and coordinates	Date	Artist / designer	Type	Designation	Notes
More images	Bust of Oliver Tambo	O. R. Tambo Recreation Ground	2007	Ian Walters	Bust	—N/a	The anti-apartheid activist lived in exile for almost three decades at Muswell Hill, and frequently visited this park. Formerly called Albert Road Recreation Ground, it was renamed after him in 2021.
More images	Statue of Oliver Tambo	O. R. Tambo Recreation Ground	2019	Artists and technicians led by Dali Tambo	Statue	—N/a	Unveiled 27 October 2019, with Thembi Tambo as guest of honour. Another version is at O. R. Tambo International Airport in South Africa.

== Tottenham ==
Image	Title / subject	Location and coordinates	Date	Artist / designer	Type	Designation	Notes
More images	Tottenham High Cross	Junction of Tottenham High Road and Monument Way 51°35′20″N 0°4′13″W	c. 1600 (modified 1809)	?	Cross	Grade II	
	All Hallows' Church War Memorial	All Hallows' Churchyard 51.6006°N 0.07656°W	c. 1920	?	Celtic cross	Grade II	
More images	Tottenham War Memorial	Tottenham Green 51°35′12.43″N 0°4′17.22″W	1923	Louis Frederick Roslyn	War memorial with statue	Grade II	
More images	Ferry boat tile motif	Tottenham Hale station, Victoria line platforms	1968	Edward Bawden	Tile murals	—N/a	
More images	Seven trees tile motif	Seven Sisters station, Victoria line platforms	1969	Hans Ernest Unger	Tile murals	—N/a	
	Embracing Forms	Tottenham High Road, near the High Cross, across from the Maa Maat Cultural Centre 51.35223°N 004.122°W	1983	Vanessa Pomeroy	Sculpture	—N/a	
	Equality-Harmony	Tangmere House, Broadwater Farm Estate	1986–1987	Gülsün Erbil	Mosaic mural	Grade II	Commissioned in the wake of the Broadwater Farm riot of 1985. Erbil was herself a resident of the estate.
	Peace Mural I	Broadwater Farm Estate	1987	Anthony Steele	Mural	—N/a	Depicts Bob Marley, Mahatma Gandhi, John Lennon and, on a mountaintop in the distance, Martin Luther King.
	Interlocking Rings	Bruce Castle Park	1990–2000	Jack Gardner	Sculpture	—N/a	Installed here in 2012, on the plinth of a removed 19th-century drinking fountain.
	Waterfall Mural	Debden block, Broadwater Farm Estate	1991	Bernette Hall and Donald Taylor	Mural	—N/a	Considered a symbol of the estate, the mural alludes to the River Moselle which runs through the site.
More images	Skeleton Horse	Chestnuts Park 51.5815°N 0.0885°W	2005	Ann Carrington	Sculpture	—N/a	Made from reclaimed wood and materials.
More images	Imagine, Remember, Reflect, React The Holocaust	Bruce Castle	2007	Paul Margetts after Claudia Holder	Sculpture	—N/a	Unveiled 2008.
	Bruce Castle Holocaust Sculpture	Bruce Castle	2013	?	Sculpture	—N/a	Unveiled 7 July 2013.
	Clay Station	Seven Sisters station	2017	Assemble and Matthew Raw	Tiles	—N/a	Handmade tiles cladding a commercial unit at the station entrance.
	Mural of Ledley King	Tottenham Community Sports Centre, High Rd	2022	MurWalls	Mural	—N/a	Unveiled January 2022. Mural of former Tottenham Hotspur captain Ledley King. The quote "This is my club, my one and only club" is in reference to King's status as a one-club player
	Mural of Harry Kane	Whitehall St	2023	MurWalls	Mural	—N/a	Unveiled in May 2023. Mural of former Tottenham Hotspur striker Harry Kane, commissioned in celebration of Kane becoming the club's record highest goal scorer in February 2023. Kane and his family left their handprints and signatures on the bottom right
	Mural of Son Heung-min	High Rd	2025	MurWalls	Mural	—N/a	Unveiled in December 2025. Mural of former Tottenham Hotspur captain Son Heung-min.

== West Green ==
Image	Title / subject	Location and coordinates	Date	Artist / designer	Type	Designation	Notes
More images	West Green and Tottenham War Memorial	West Green Road 51.5865°N 0.0872°W	1922	—N/a	Obelisk	Grade II	Unveiled 16 July 1922.
	Windrush Memorial	Rose Garden	1998	?	Marker with plaque	—N/a	Unveiled 23 June 1998.
	Sustrans Portrait Bench	Downhills Park 51.5872°N 0.0880°W	2013	?	Sculpture	—N/a	Depicts Nicola Adams, Walter Tull and Luke Howard.

== Wood Green ==
Image	Title / subject	Location and coordinates	Date	Artist / designer	Type	Designation	Notes
More images	Catharine Smithies Memorial Drinking Fountain	Bounds Green Road 51.6009°N 0.1162°W	1879	?	Obelisk with drinking fountain	Grade II	
More images	Drinking fountain and cattle trough	Wood Green High Road, near junction with Trinity Road 51.600947°N 0.111807°W	1901	?	Drinking fountain and cattle trough	Grade II	
More images	St Saviour's War Memorial	Alexandra Park Road 51.5983°N 0.1292°W	1919	John Samuel Alder	Memorial cross	Grade II	
More images	Wood Green War Memorial	Wood Green High Road, near junction with Bounds Green Road 51.5995°N 0.1109°W	1920	?	War memorial	Grade II	

== See also ==
- Slave Labour, a mural by Banksy which appeared in Wood Green in 2012

== Bibliography ==
- Matthews, Peter (2018). London's Statues and Monuments. Oxford: Shire Publications.
