= Marilyn Collins =

Marilyn Collins is a London-based sculptor, known internationally, who has exhibited in many parts of the world.

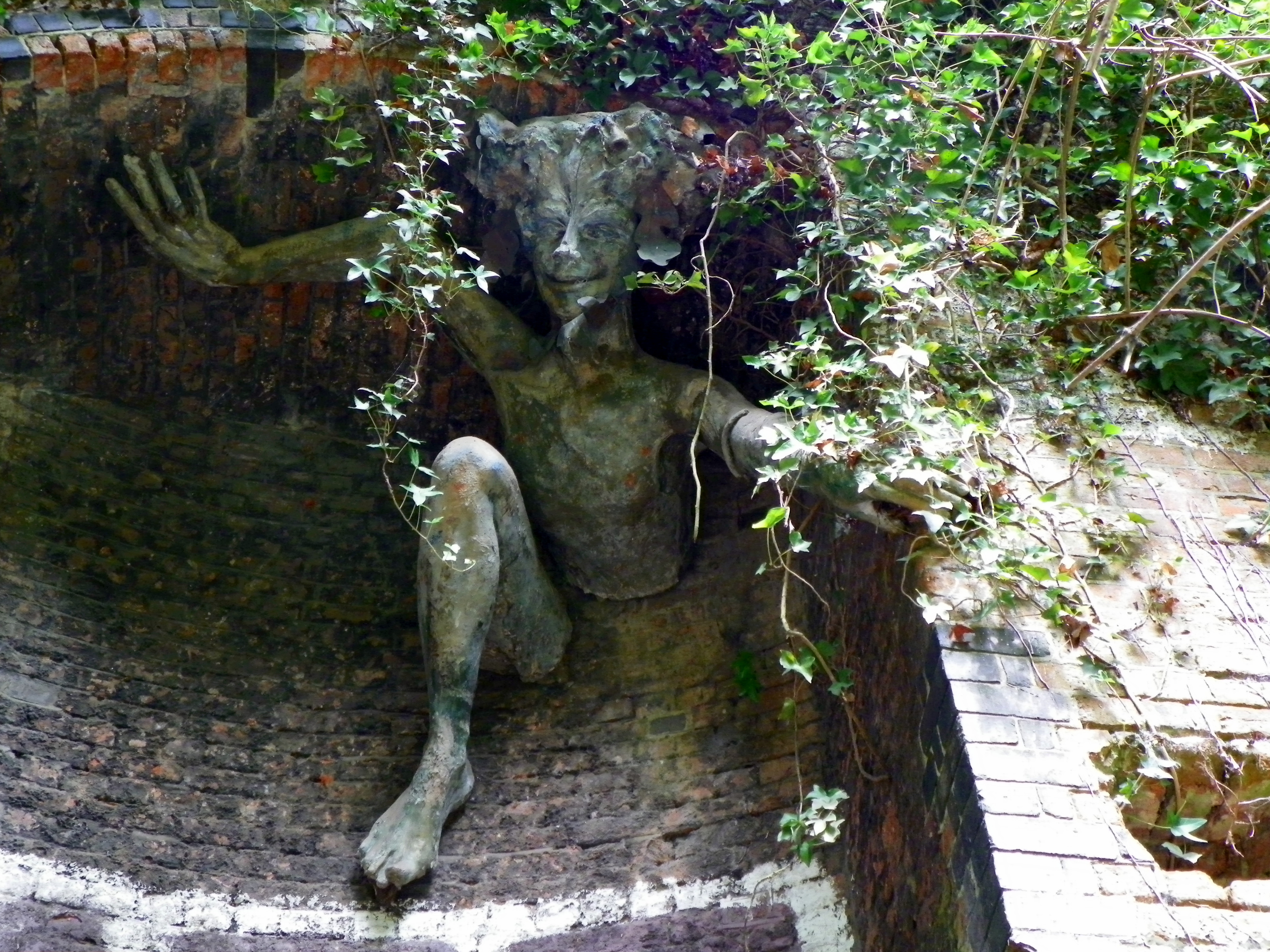
The spriggan sculpture

== Life and career ==
Collins has contributed several installations displayed in public gardens in the UK, a notable example being the Spriggan set in a wall on the Parkland Walk, North London. Marilyn Collins began exhibiting in 1985, when invited to have a solo show at the Swarthmore Centre in Leeds. From 1993 – 1994 she worked with Gary Cromack on installations in France, Germany and London. She takes inspiration from environmental issues and feminism, and ecology shapes her perspective.

She was Educated at Bradford college BA from 1981-1984, then at John Cass School of Art Foundation 1980-1981, and was a Guest student at the Universitat fur Angewandte Kunst, Vienna 1997-1998. She furthered her education at Creative Mentoring at Collage Arts 2003, Freeform Arts Trust NVQ3 Sept – Dec 1998, Tamil Nadu Studying traditional methods of lost wax casting Feb – INDIA with sculptor R. Ravindren Mar 1996 Haringey Arts Council Mural Project 1994–1995, SHAPE training for artists working in community settings 1987.

== Commissions and publicly sited work ==
- March 2001 ‘The Drop’ Water feature for a wildlife garden Priory Park, London
- June 1997 ‘Ant’s Nest’ Commissioned by Stoke Newington Midsummer Festival Abney Park Cemetery
- June 1995 - Artist in residence for the Community Centre Garden Chettle Court Estate (Haringey)
- Jan 1996 Water feature, gate features and paving
- May 1995 - Mural at Haringey Asian Action Group Haringey Arts Council Mural Project
- Oct 1993 ‘Spriggan’ Parkland Walk, London

== Group exhibitions ==
- April 2006 'Eating out in the Great Outdoors' MODA, Enfield
- October 2005 'Zoo-a-logical', Knapp Gallery
- May 2005 ‘Grounds for Designs’ MODA, Enfield
- May 2005 ‘Sculptural Possibilities’ Cupola gallery, Sheffield
- July 2004 ‘Summer Art in Eden’ Eden restaurant, Harrow on the Hill
- July 2004 ‘What’s That in the Woods’ Millfield Arts Centre, Edmonton
- April 2004 ‘Outdoor Habitats’ Museum of Domestic Architecture, Enfield
- Sept 2003 ‘Ancient Greeks and modern Europeans’ Cosmos, Paleochora, Crete
- July 2003 2 Sphinxes ‘Drawn from Nature’ Exbury Gardens (Beatrice Royal gallery)
- June 2003 ‘Vortex Flotilla’ The Sculpture Trail at Hebden Bridge
- Oct 2001 ‘Inhabiting the Border’ Bruce Castle Museum Gallery -An exhibition I curated of artists from Vienna
- July 2001 ‘Memorial – poor cow’ Cuckoo Farm, Colchester
- Feb 1999 Free Formations. An exhibition of design work for communities Sutton House
- Sept 1998 Wien Fluss -Sound Sculpture – This work was part of an exhibition -Horen ist Sehen / Oir es Ver
- June 1998 'Tourist Trap/Selbst Portrat' Passage Galerie Kunstlerhaus - Installation at 4 U-Bahn stations in Vienna
- June 1997 ‘Ant’s Nest’ (Related to the Abney Park Cemetery piece) Hardcastle Craggs Sculpture Trail
- July 1994 ‘Grass Knot’ ‘Eurosculpture’ Symposium – 200 sculptors working in public Carhaix Brittany
- 1994 ‘Sphinx’ and ‘Leaf Stele’ ‘The Mythic Garden’ Chagford

== Solo exhibitions ==
- 2004 ‘Ancient Greeks and Modern Europeans’ Eden restaurant Harrow on the Hill
- 2003 ‘Transit’ 27, Burgasse Vienna
- 1997 travel documents Florians, Crouch End
- 1997 and Jackson's Lane

== Workshops in schools and in the community ==
- Sunnyside Gardens 8.08.2000, 8.12.2000
- Cuckoo Farm Studios 29.06 2001
- Sculpture trail 30.06.2001
- Islington Ecology Centre 31.7.2000, 3.08.2000, 20.06 2001, 14.08.2001, 21.08.2001, 28.08.2001
- The Millennium Centre, Dagenham 2.04 2002
- The Surrey Institute of Art and Design 19.06.2002
- Mossford Park School 18 03 2002,19.03.2002
- Channing Junior School, Highgate 6.05.2003
- Lammas School, Leyton 14, 15 and 16.07.2003
- Hornsey High School for girls Nov – Dec 2003
- Ashmount School N19 June 2004
- Gable Hall School, Stanford-le-hope 15.7.2004
- Kids Allowed, Ealing Family Housing 30.03.2005
- Thames Sculpture Group ‘Nest Project’ June – July 2005
- Five weekly workshops ending in an exhibition at the Acton Festival, and at the Royal college of Art
- Elthorne regeneration festival 4.7.2005
- New River Festival 11.7.2005
- Beavers Community Primary School. 5-week project making sculptures for the conservation area, October - November 2005
- 'Wild at Art'. a six-week project with Hounslow Chinese School making sculpture and a water feature on the topic of biodiversity March - May 2006. Exhibition at Redlees Arts Centre and other sites around Hounslow.
- 'Art Matters' Workshops based on the work of Rodin organised by National Children's Homes with the Royal Academy. June 2006. Work to be exhibited at the Royal Academy autumn 2006
