= Parkland Walk =

Rail trail in north London, England

Coordinates: 51.5742°N 0.1245°W

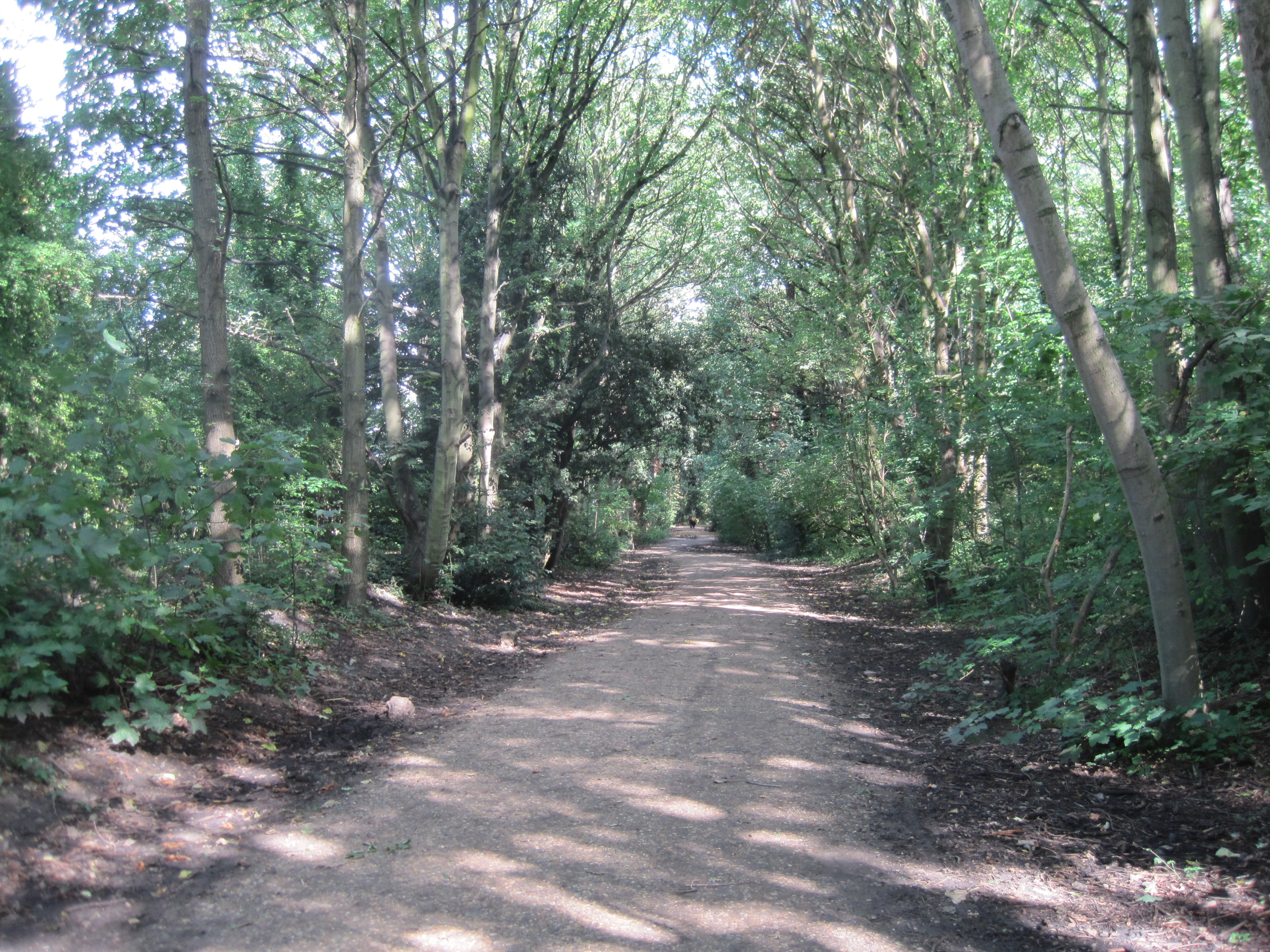
- Length: 3.1 miles (5.0 km)
- Location: London Boroughs of Haringey and Islington
- Established: 1984
- Trailheads: Alexandra Park, Finsbury Park
- Use: Walking, Cycling
- Website: https://www.parkland-walk.org.uk/

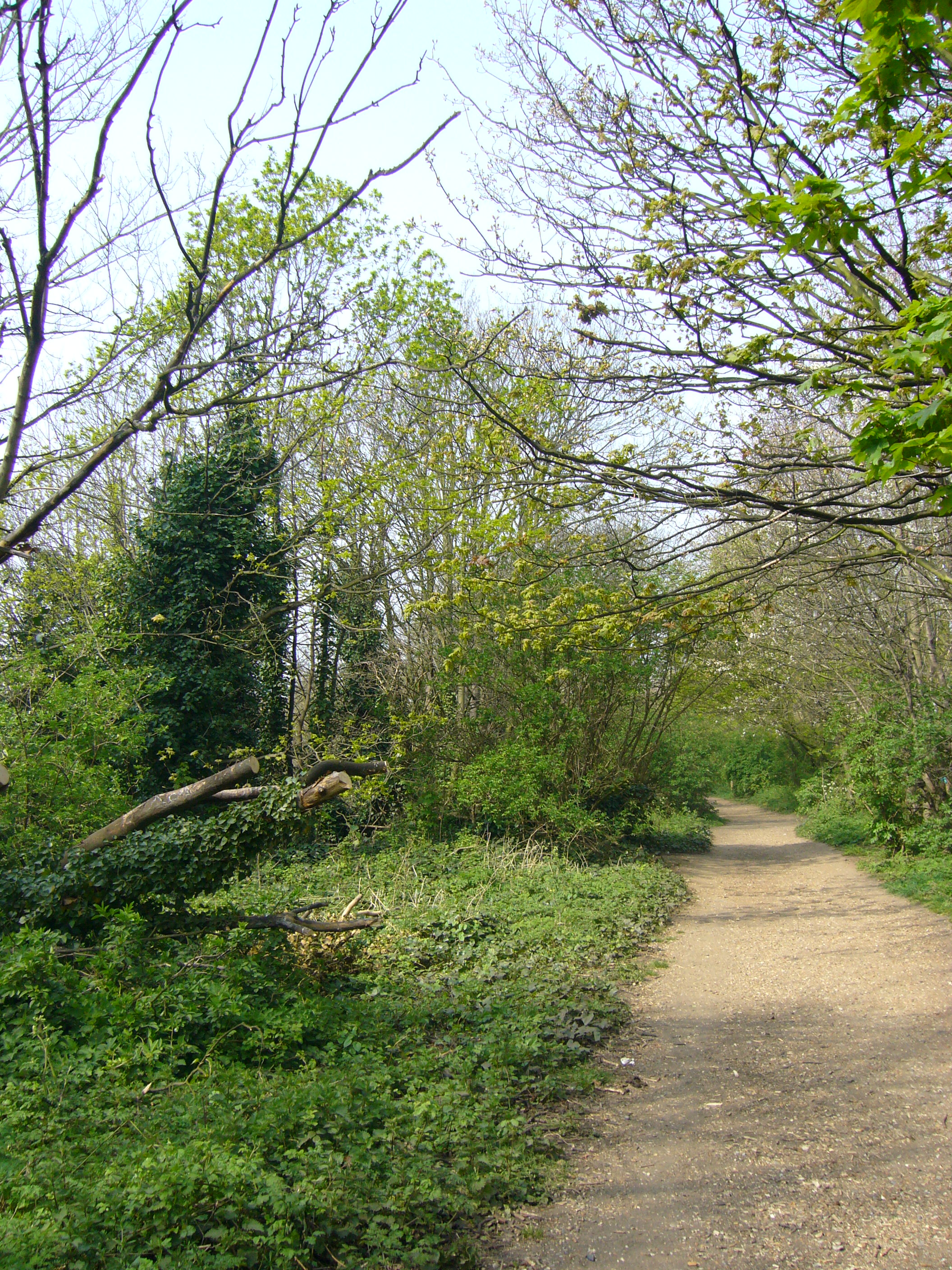
Parkland Walk

The Parkland Walk is a 3.1-mile (5.0 km) linear green pedestrian and cycle route in north London, England; it is often mistakenly described as being 4.5 miles long. It follows the course of the Edgware, Highgate and London Railway that connected Finsbury Park and Alexandra Palace, via Stroud Green, Crouch End, Highgate and Muswell Hill. The route follows the bridges and cuttings of the line, but avoids the closed surface section of Highgate station and its adjoining tunnels, which are closed to walkers for safety reasons. The rail trail is almost all in Haringey, but a short stretch between Crouch Hill and Crouch End Hill is in Islington; this section incorporates Crouch Hill Park.

The walk is a local nature reserve and a Site of Metropolitan Importance for Nature Conservation. It was declared a local nature reserve in 1990 and is London's longest such reserve. Between Finsbury Park and Highgate, the path forms part of the Capital Ring strategic walking route.

== History ==
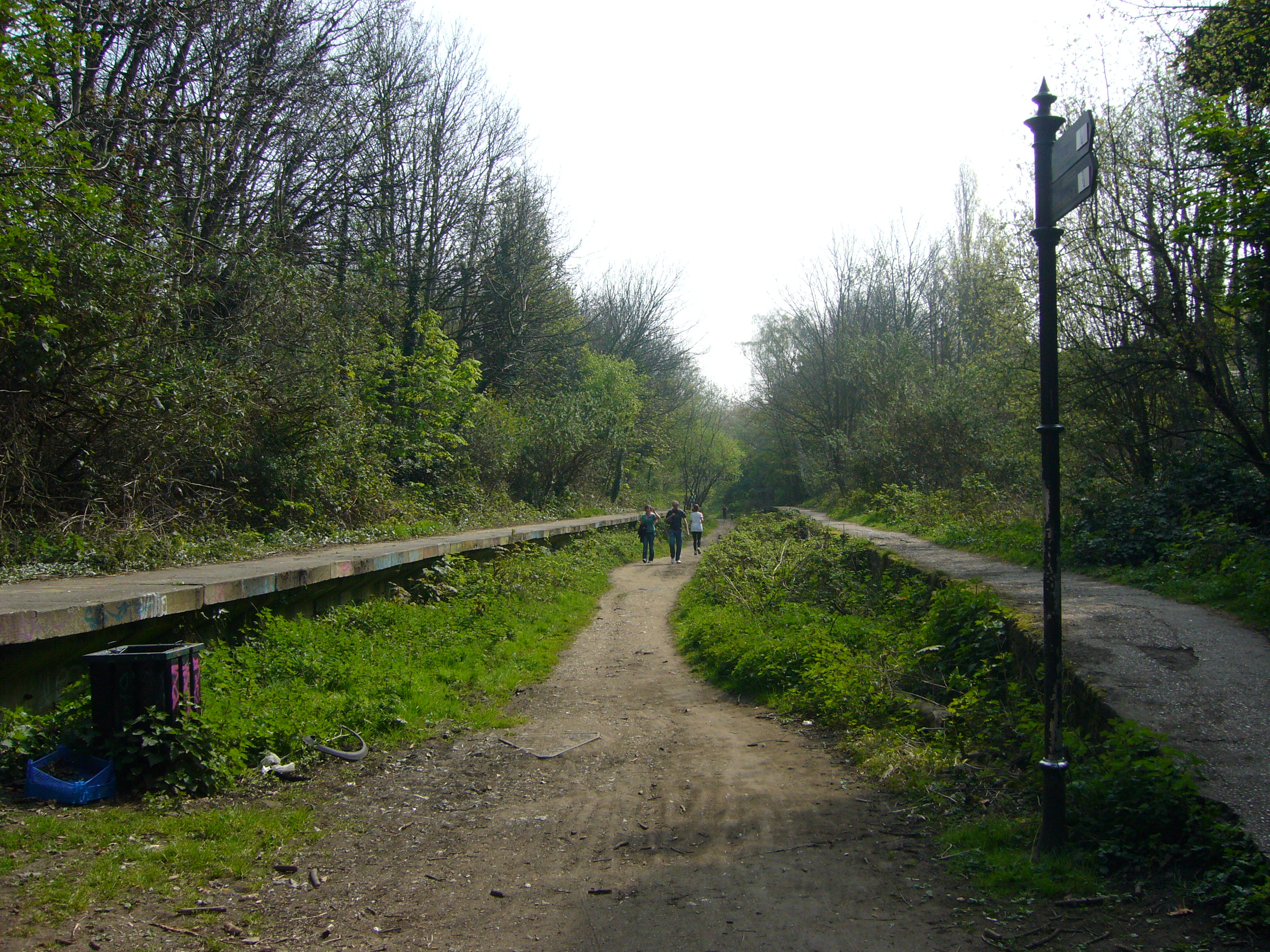
The old platforms at Crouch End station

=== Railway line ===
The route of the path between Finsbury Park and Highgate was constructed originally by the Edgware, Highgate and London Railway in the 1860s, as part of its railway line from Finsbury Park to Edgware. Before the line was opened on 22 August 1867, it was purchased by the larger Great Northern Railway (GNR). Branch lines from Finchley Central to High Barnet and from Highgate to Alexandra Palace opened in 1872 and 1873. The GNR became part of the London & North Eastern Railway (LNER) in 1923.

Plans were published by London Underground in the 1930s for the incorporation of these lines into the Northern line (the Northern Heights Plan), but the onset of World War II stopped the planning at an advanced stage. After the war, the development was abandoned but passenger trains continued to run on this line until 3 July 1954, when British Railways (the successor to the LNER) ended such services permanently. The Alexandra Palace branch closed completely in 1957, but the link from Finsbury Park to Highgate and East Finchley remained open to freight traffic until 1964. Even after freight traffic had ceased, the line continued to be used to transfer empty tube stock between lines; this ceased in 1970, because of the poor condition of some of the intermediate bridges, and the track was lifted in 1972.

=== Creation of the rail trail ===
After the track was lifted, most of the platforms and station buildings were demolished. The sections of the line from Finsbury Park to Highgate and from Highgate to Alexandra Palace, excluding the intermediate section through the tunnels and station at Highgate, were converted into the Parkland Walk. This was opened officially in 1984, following extensive resurfacing and access improvements.

The walk was declared a local nature reserve in 1990.

== Route description ==
=== Finsbury Park to Crouch Hill ===
The route starts close to Finsbury Park station, at the western side of the East Coast Main Line, beside a foot overbridge that gives access from the eastern end of Oxford Road to Finsbury Park itself. The route rises on an embankment overlooking the back gardens of the Victorian suburban houses. The route then bridges Upper Tollington Park.

The next bridge takes the walk over Stapleton Hall Road, at a point where the Gospel Oak to Barking railway line also passes beneath the road. Stroud Green station once stood at this point, with its platforms cantilevered out over the sides of the bridge over Stapleton Hall Road. The station master's house at road level is extant, but there are no traces of the track or roadside station buildings, which were destroyed in a fire in 1967.

After crossing Mount Pleasant Villas on an overbridge, the embankment gives way to a cutting as the land rises north-westwards. The route continues beneath overbridges carrying Mount View Road and Crouch Hill.

=== Crouch Hill to Crouch End Hill ===
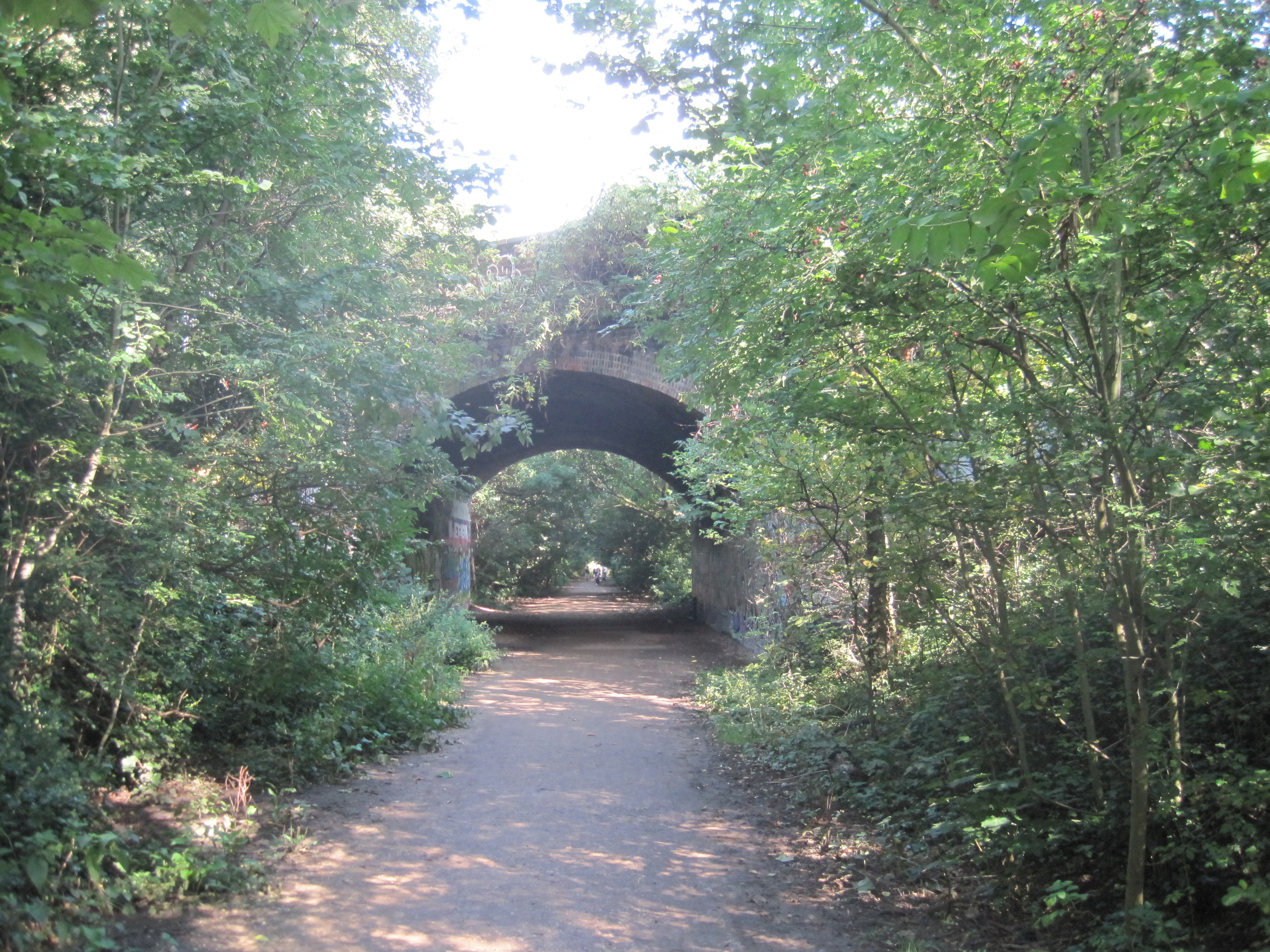
Parkland Walk in Islington, with the Crouch Hill bridge

Immediately after passing under Crouch Hill to the left, a large block house can be seen; this was originally built to house switchgear for the Northern Heights project, as part of the plans to incorporate the line into the tube system. This has been redeveloped by adding extensions, cantilevered off the north and west sides of the existing building, and extending a short distance over the Parkland Walk. Now known as The Cape, it is managed directly by Islington Council and houses a community energy centre, a youth centre, a new ecology centre and Ashmount School's after-school club. There is a public cafe in the building to which there is direct access from the Parkland Walk.

Passing the blockhouse, the walk enters Crouch Hill Park which spreads to the south of the old railway line. The new park has a triangular form covering an area of 25,730 square metres (277,000 sq ft), which is bounded by the walkway to the north and housing on the other sides; it is home to birds, invertebrates and bats, including some species locally uncommon or declining. It can be accessed from a number of access points on the Parkland Walk, from a public footpath called the Vicarage Path and from pedestrian entrances to the south and west of the park. A new building within the park contains Ashmount School, a community primary school and Bowlers Community Nursery, which is a separate charity-run voluntary nursery.

Beyond the site of the new school building, and just before Crouch End station, is a footbridge across the Parkland Walk which crossed over the railway. It was retained after the line's closure and now connects Haslemere Road in Haringey to Crouch Hill Park in Islington.

At this point, the partly overgrown platforms of Crouch End station remain. The route passes under the site of the former station building and the road bridge over the cutting carrying Crouch End Hill, at the far end of the platforms.

=== Crouch End Hill to Highgate tunnels ===
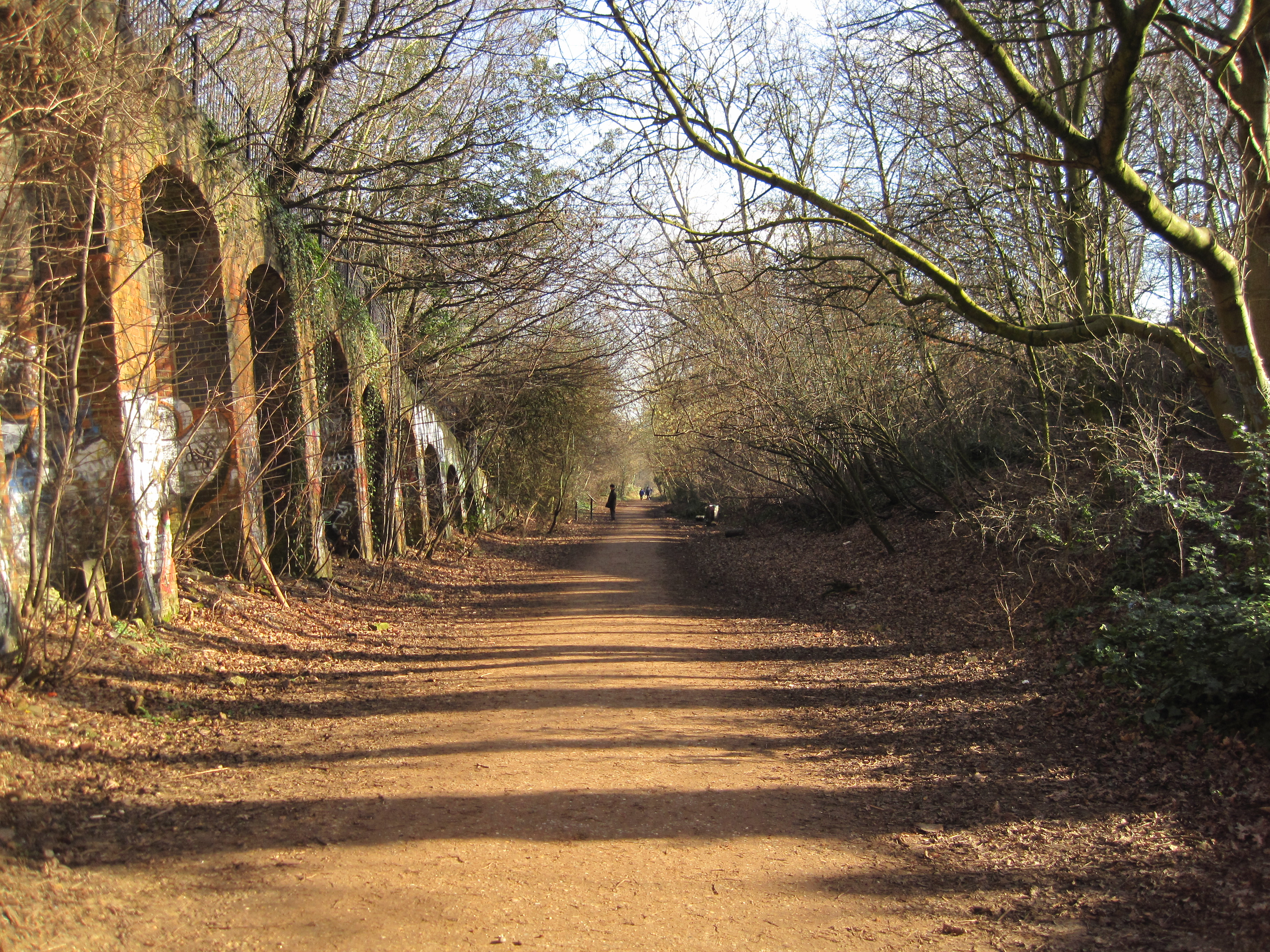
Parkland Walk, near to Crouch End station

Beyond this, the cutting opens out on the northern side as the route skirts a hill, parallel to Hornsey Lane where some apartment blocks have been built. The route bridges Stanhope Road on a footbridge replacing the original structure. The route continues on an embankment to a brick-built bridge over Northwood Road, beneath which traffic can flow in only one direction at a time.

The surrounding ground rises rapidly and the route becomes a cutting at the end of which the portals of the southern pair of Highgate tunnels come into view. Vestiges of line-side electrical equipment for the planned 1930s electrification of the line and part of the structure of the old Highgate station are visible through the tunnels. The tunnels are closed to pedestrian access; consequently, the main route ends here with an exit onto Holmesdale Road. Should the walker choose to proceed further, they can travel uphill along Holmesdale Road which soon joins Archway Road; continuing along Archway Road, travelling north past Highgate station, leads to the junction between Archway Road and Muswell Hill Road.

=== Cranley Gardens to Alexandra Palace ===
The route between the northern end of the Highgate Tunnels and the Northern Line depot at Wellington Junction is used by trains entering the depot; the rest of the cutting around Highgate Wood from Wellington Junction to Cranley Gardens station is outside the wood's fence. It is not officially part of Parkland Walk and so is allowed to stay overgrown.

A further shorter section of the walk begins along Muswell Hill Road, just beyond Cranley Gardens, where the road overbridge crosses the old line. At the site of the former station, the old trackbed has been replaced with a school and housing. The walk continues opposite, via steps down to the trackbed, towards Alexandra Palace, skirting the side of Muswell Hill. The span of the seventeen-arch viaduct over St James's Lane gives a view eastwards and southwards over London. The route ends with a pedestrian tunnel, replacing the former overbridge, which passes under the road Muswell Hill itself. At this point, Muswell Hill primary school has been built on the trackbed and the suburb's former railway station.

The pedestrian route by-passes the primary school and leads into Alexandra Park, where further remains of the railway route can be seen. The former Alexandra Palace station building is extant and is used for community purposes.

== Wildlife ==
=== Flora ===
No trees were permitted to grow close to the track when the railway was operational. The range of trees found today has grown up in the last fifty years; most arrived naturally (oak, ash, birch, hawthorn, cherry, apple, holly, rowan, sycamore and yew), but a few additional species have been planted (field maple, hazel, black Italian poplar and white poplar).

More than three hundred species of wild flowers have been recorded on the Parkland Walk. They range from commonplace to exotic. Species sighted include Michaelmas daisies, goldenrods, buddleia and Guernsey fleabane.

=== Fauna ===
The great variety of plant life sustains a wide range of animals. Twenty-two species of butterfly have been recorded. Hedgehogs benefit from the proximity of adjacent homes and occasional feedings from homeowners. Foxes are plentiful and muntjac (a small species of deer) are seen occasionally. A colony of slowworms thrive along the grassy embankment. More than sixty species of bird have been seen along the walk and many breed here. Parkland Walk is known to be an important site for bats in the London context, providing important foraging habitat and an excellent dark commuting route. A significant bat roost is known to exist in the vicinity.

== Arts and culture ==
=== Spriggan sculpture and Stephen King ===
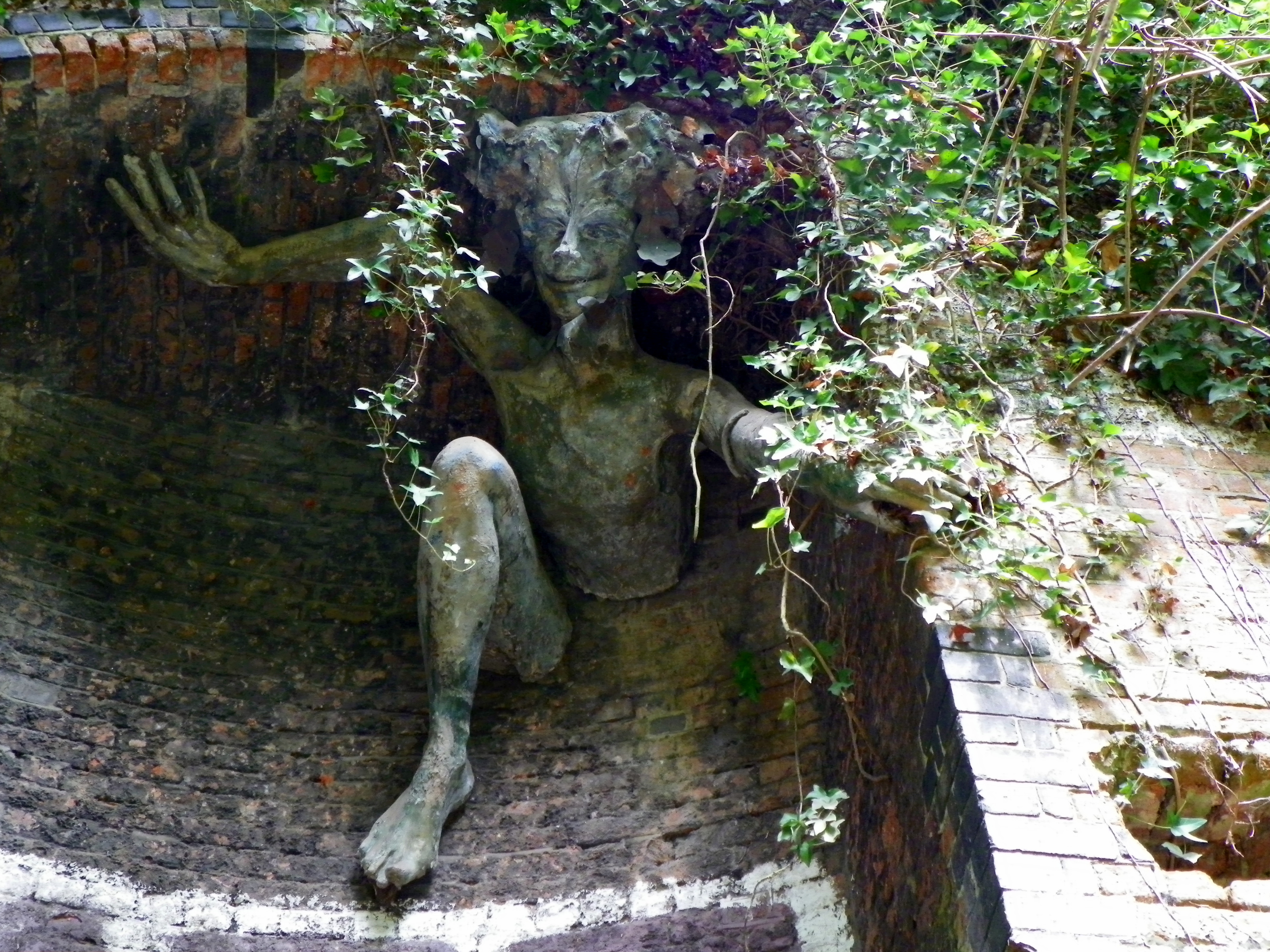
The spriggan sculpture

Along the walk, just before the disused platforms at Crouch End, a man-sized green spriggan sculpture by Marilyn Collins has been placed in one of the alcoves of the wall at the footbridge, before the former Crouch End station.

According to a local urban legend, a ghostly goat-man haunted the walk in the 1970s and 80s. Local children playing out in the evenings would "dare" each other to walk the route from the Crouch End Hill bridge to the Crouch Hill bridge in the darkness. It has been suggested that the sculpture, and the Parkland Walk generally, provided the inspiration for Stephen King's short story "Crouch End". However, as the story was first published in 1980 and the sculpture not erected until 1993, there can be no connection between the Spriggan and the story. It is possible that the walk may have inspired King, as he stayed with friend and Crouch End resident Peter Straub during the 1970s. No definite link between the Parkland Walk and the story has ever been proven.

=== Graffiti ===
London newspaper Ham & High reported that the Parkland Walk has "a long history as a 'spot' where well known graffiti artists decorate tunnels", seen as a positive by some local residents and the Friends of Parkland Walk.

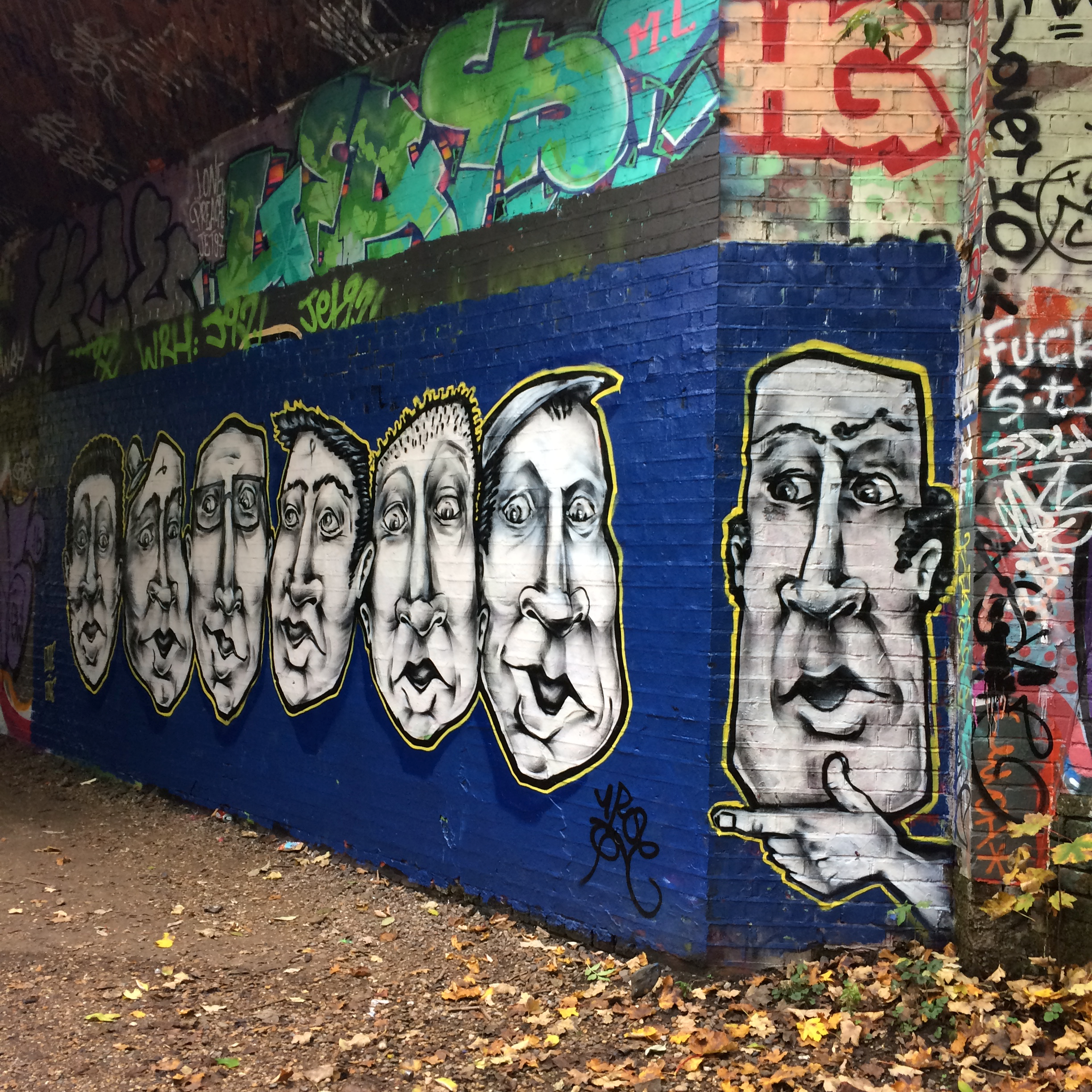

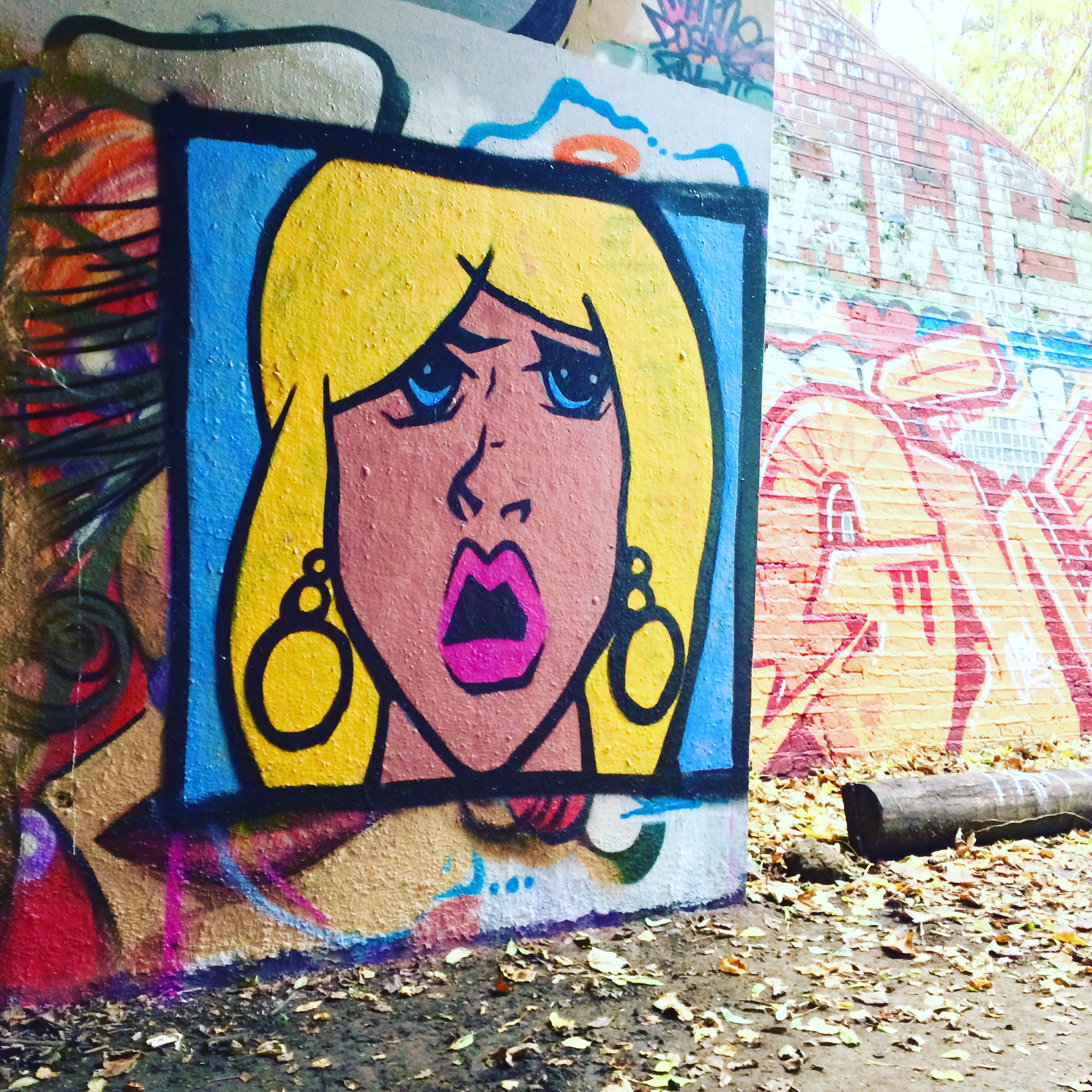

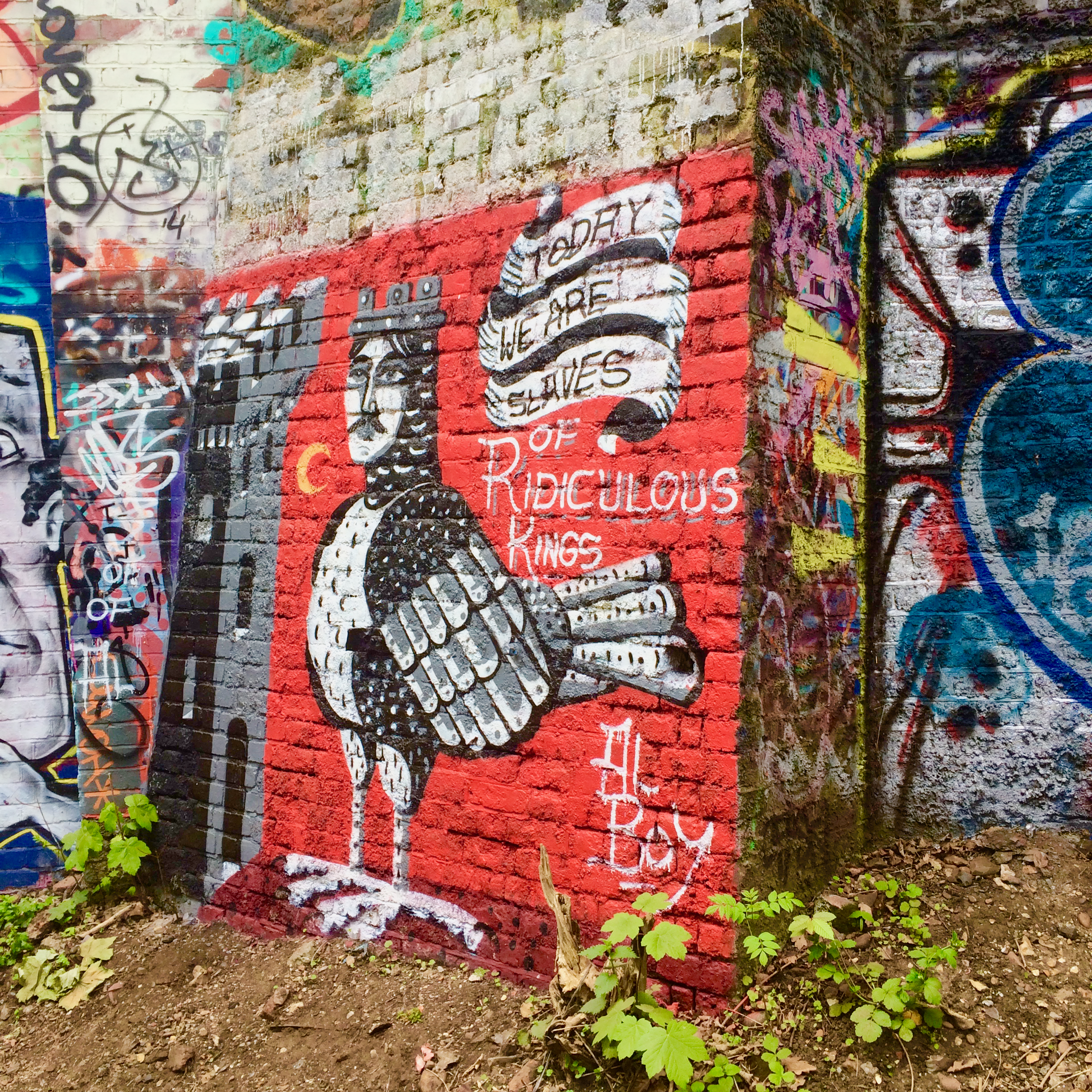

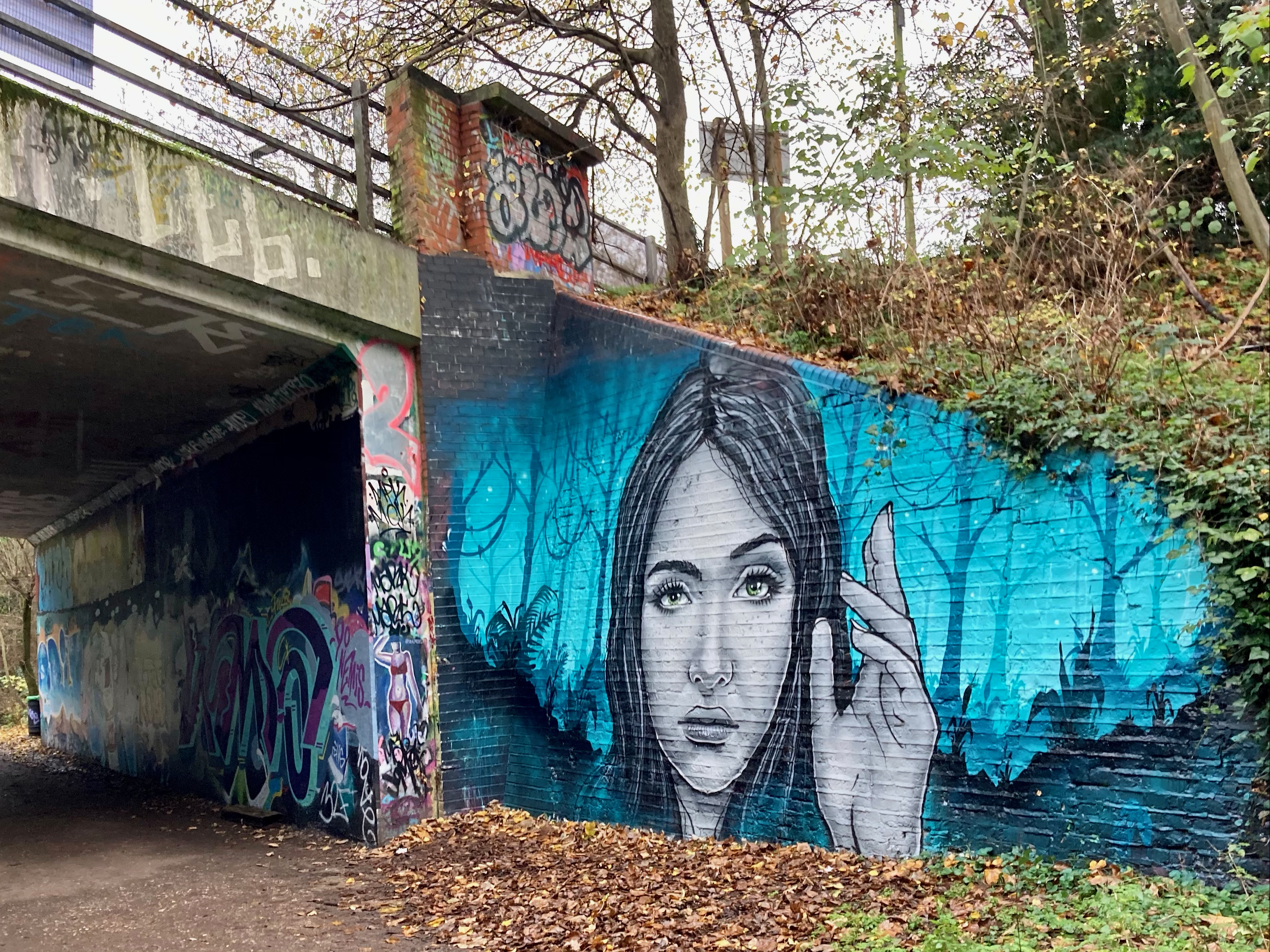

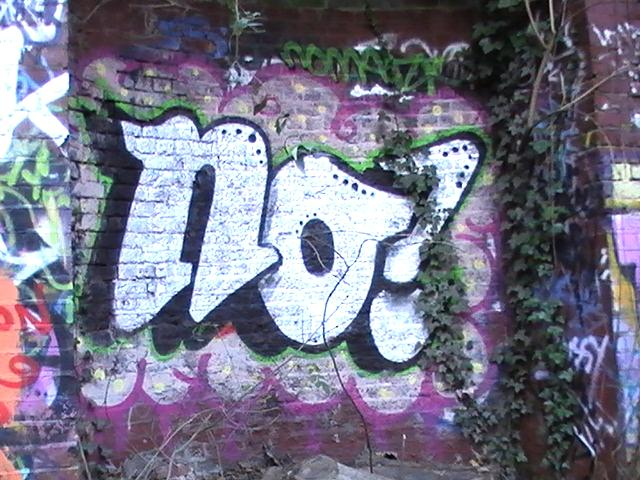

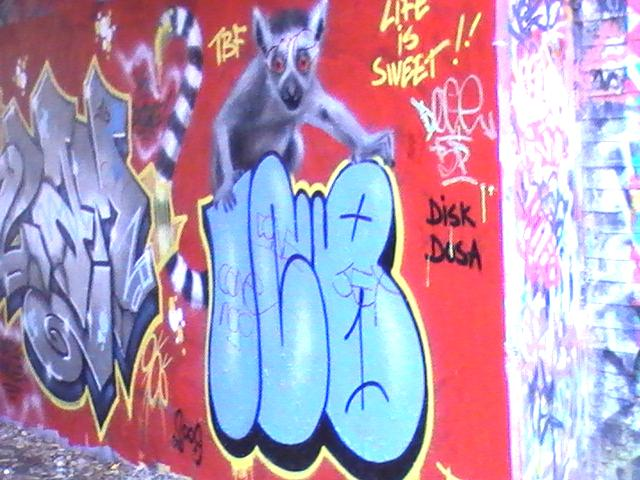

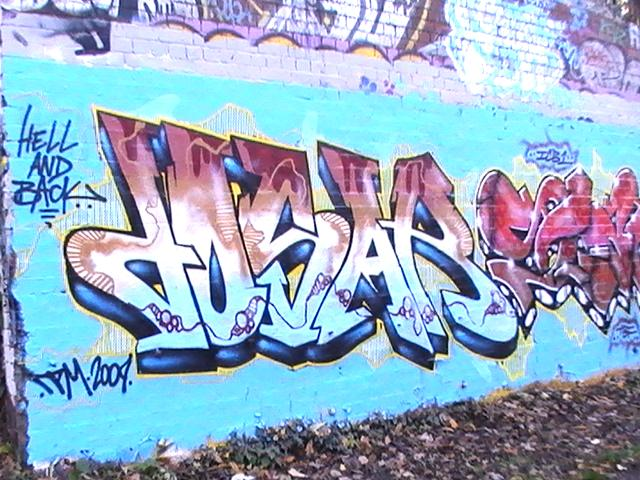

=== Chewing gum art trail ===
In 2020, artist Ben Wilson was invited to produce a series of miniature artworks on blobs of chewing gum along the trail. Council funding was initially mooted for the project but, when this fell through, Wilson went ahead anyway. Subjects depicted on the works include a rescue dog, a jogger and a ghost station from the Walk's original railway.

== Crouch Hill Park project ==
The Islington section of the Parkland Walk formed a part of the Crouch Hill Park project; this provided improved accommodation for several institutions and reinstated an area of previously derelict parkland to the south of the Parkland Walk as a public park and nature reserve. The project included the demolition of the existing Bowlers Nursery building and the Crouch Hill Recreation Centre; these were replaced with a new building containing the relocated Ashmount School, a community primary school and a new Bowlers Nursery. It also involved the rebuilding a blockhouse, built originally to house switchgear for the never-completed Northern Heights plan; it was used subsequently to house a youth project. The whole project was executed at a total cost of £13 million to Islington Council.

The project was opposed by the Friends of the Parkland Walk, the Ashmount Site Action Group, the Highgate Society and the Twentieth Century Society; all of whom favoured retention of the school building on the original site, off Hornsey Lane. Politically, the project was opposed by the Islington Green Party, but supported by both Labour Party and Liberal Democrats, by the Ashmount School governors, by Ashmount school parents and by Bowlers Nursery. When the council carried out a consultation amongst residents, two thirds of the respondents were in favour of the scheme.

The project was also closely scrutinised by the Mayor of London, whose consent was required as the land is specially protected Metropolitan Open Land, and further examined by the Secretary of State for Communities and Local Government who could have chosen to call the project in and hold a public inquiry; despite requests to do so, he did not. Objections to the project were made both to Islington Council, to the Mayor of London and the Secretary of State. An application for judicial review was threatened but, in the event, did not materialise.

Further, a formal complaint against the council for proceeding with the project was made to the Local Government Ombudsman by the Ashmount Site Action Group (ASAG) but was not upheld. In the council election of 2010, all three councillors elected for the local ward, in Islington, Hillrise (two Liberal Democrats and one Labour) had publicly declared their support for the scheme. The project was financed by Islington Council, under a number of budget headings recognising that the project was contributing to the reaccommodation of several different bodies. It also received a special grant due to its low carbon status. In particular it was expected that a significant part of the cost of reproviding Ashmount School would be raised by realising the value of the old school site on Hornsey Lane. However, when Islington Council, relying on the recommendations of a planning inspector, applied to the Secretary of State for Education, Michael Gove, for permission to cease to use the old site for a school; this was refused and the site was requisitioned without compensation to Islington Council, for use by a Free School.

In order to conform with the rules for building on Metropolitan Open Land, the footprint of the new school building did not exceed that of the demolished buildings. The design includes a brown roof, climbing plants on walls, and areas of planted grassland, wild flowers and woodland. Bowlers Nursery moved into the new building in August 2012 and Ashmount School moved to the site in January 2013. Building operations at the Cape were finally completed in February 2013, two years and four months after the contract to carry out the work was signed by Islington Council. The Crouch Hill Project received a 2012 BREEAM award, due to the use of rain water harvesting, natural ventilation systems to keep the school building cool in summer and the setting up of an "energy centre" in the blockhouse, which by means of combined heat and power provides district heating both for the whole site and for social housing near the site, as well as generating electricity. The main fuel used is gas, but there is also provision for the use of biomass in the form of woodchips. The architects were Penoyre & Prasad and the contractors were Willmott Dixon.
