= Spriggan =

Legendary creature in Cornish faerie lore

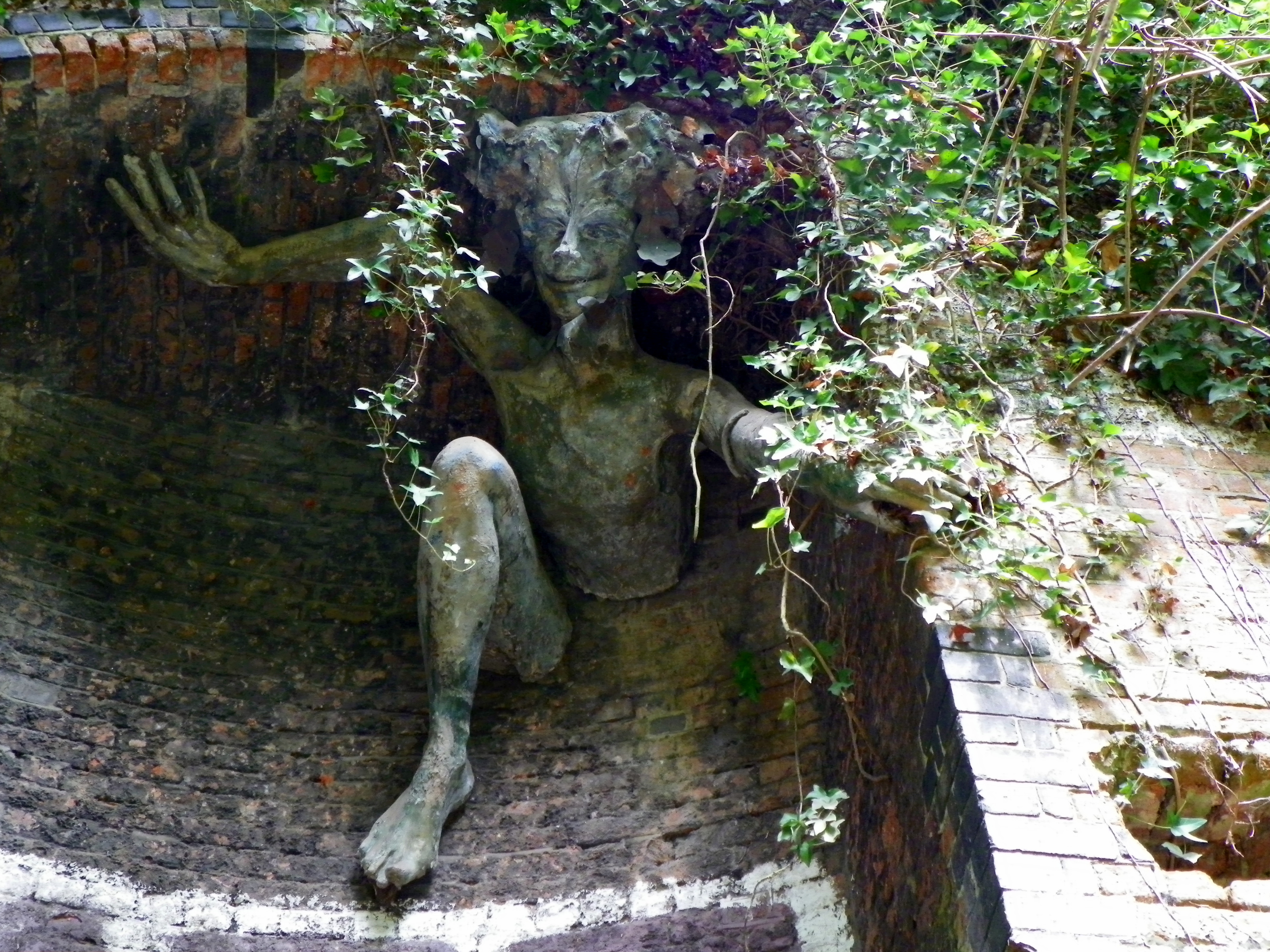
- Sculpture by Marilyn Collins

Creature information
- Grouping: Mythological creature Fairy; Sprite

Origin
- Country: England
- Region: Cornwall

A spriggan /sprɪdʒən/ is a legendary creature from Cornish folklore. Spriggans are particularly associated with West Penwith in Cornwall.

== Etymology ==
Spriggan is pronounced /sprɪdʒən/ rather than /sprɪɡən/; the word is borrowed from the Cornish plural spyrysyon 'spirits'.

== In folklore ==
Spriggans have often been depicted as grotesquely ugly, wizened old men with large childlike heads. They were said to be found at old ruins, cairns, and barrows guarding buried treasure. Although small in stature, they have often been considered to be the ghosts of giants and retained gigantic strength, and in one story collected by Robert Hunt, they showed the ability to swell to enormous size. Hunt associated these spirits with the hillfort known as Trencrom Hill in Cornwall.

Spriggans were notorious for their unpleasant dispositions, and delighted in working mischief against those who offended them. They raised sudden whirlwinds to terrify travellers, sent storms to blight crops, and sometimes stole away mortal children, leaving their ugly changelings in their place. They were blamed if a house was robbed or a building collapsed, or if cattle were stolen. In one story, an old woman got the better of a band of spriggans by turning her clothing inside-out (turning clothing supposedly being as effective as holy water or iron in repelling fairies) to gain their loot.

On Christmas Eve, spriggans met for a midnight Mass at the bottom of deep mines, and passersby could hear them singing. However, it was not spriggans but the buccas or knockers who were associated with tin mining, and who played a protective role towards the miners.

Based on the collections of Robert Hunt and William Bottrell, Katharine Briggs characterized the spriggans as fairy bodyguards. The English Dialect Dictionary (1905) compared them to the trolls of Scandinavia.

== Sculpture ==
A sculpture of a spriggan by Marilyn Collins can be seen in Crouch End, London, in some arches lining a section of the Parkland Walk (a disused railway line). The sculpture was installed in 1993. If walking along the Parkland Walk from Finsbury Park to Highgate station, the Spriggan is to the right just before the disused railway platforms of the former Crouch End station. To the left, on the southside of the Parkland Walk is Crouch Hill Park where Ashmount School has been located since January 2013. The sculpture is sometimes mistaken for the Green Man or Pan.

== In popular culture ==
Spriggans have been featured as fey creatures in the Dungeons & Dragons roleplaying game since the 1980s.

Additionally, in the roleplaying game Changeling: The Dreaming by White Wolf Publishing, Spriggans are a type of dark fae called Thallain. Here they are characterized as lazy, crude and cruel thieves who enjoy guarding treasures. They have an inherent weakness that causes them to kidnap young children as they enjoy both the parent's and child's misery, although they never directly harm the child. They are a dark counterpart to the Piskies.

Spriggans—in the style of the Parkland Walk sculpture—can be found in The Elder Scrolls series of video games, where they are portrayed as exclusively female.

In the video game World of Warcraft, the Spriggan are a race of fae loyal to the Drust, a dark and twisted version of the fae.

In the Japanese roleplaying video game Trails Through Daybreak, Spriggan is a title taken on by the game's main protagonist, Van Arkride. The title represents a person who solves morally gray problems—an underground fixer.

In the video game Last Epoch, Spriggan Form is a Druid-only Shapeshift Spell Skill, which transforms players' characters into a forest Deity, increasing their casting capabilities and granting new abilities. Spriggan Form revolves around Attunement and Vitality attributes and scales on those.

In the anime and toy franchise Beyblade Burst, the character Shu Kurenai uses a Beyblade named Spriggan (localized as "Spryzen" in English-language releases). Across the series, multiple upgraded versions of Spriggan/Spryzen appear, each incorporating themes of duality, balance, and transformation—traits that connect loosely to the mythical spriggan's reputed changeable or deceptive nature.

== General sources ==
- Briggs, Katharine. A Dictionary of Fairies. Penguin, 1976, ISBN 978-0140176582
- Underground History: "The Northern Heights", Hywel Williams. Accessed 8 July 2007.
