= Priory Park, Haringey =

Park in Hornsey, London, England

Coordinates: 51°35′06″N 0°07′30″W

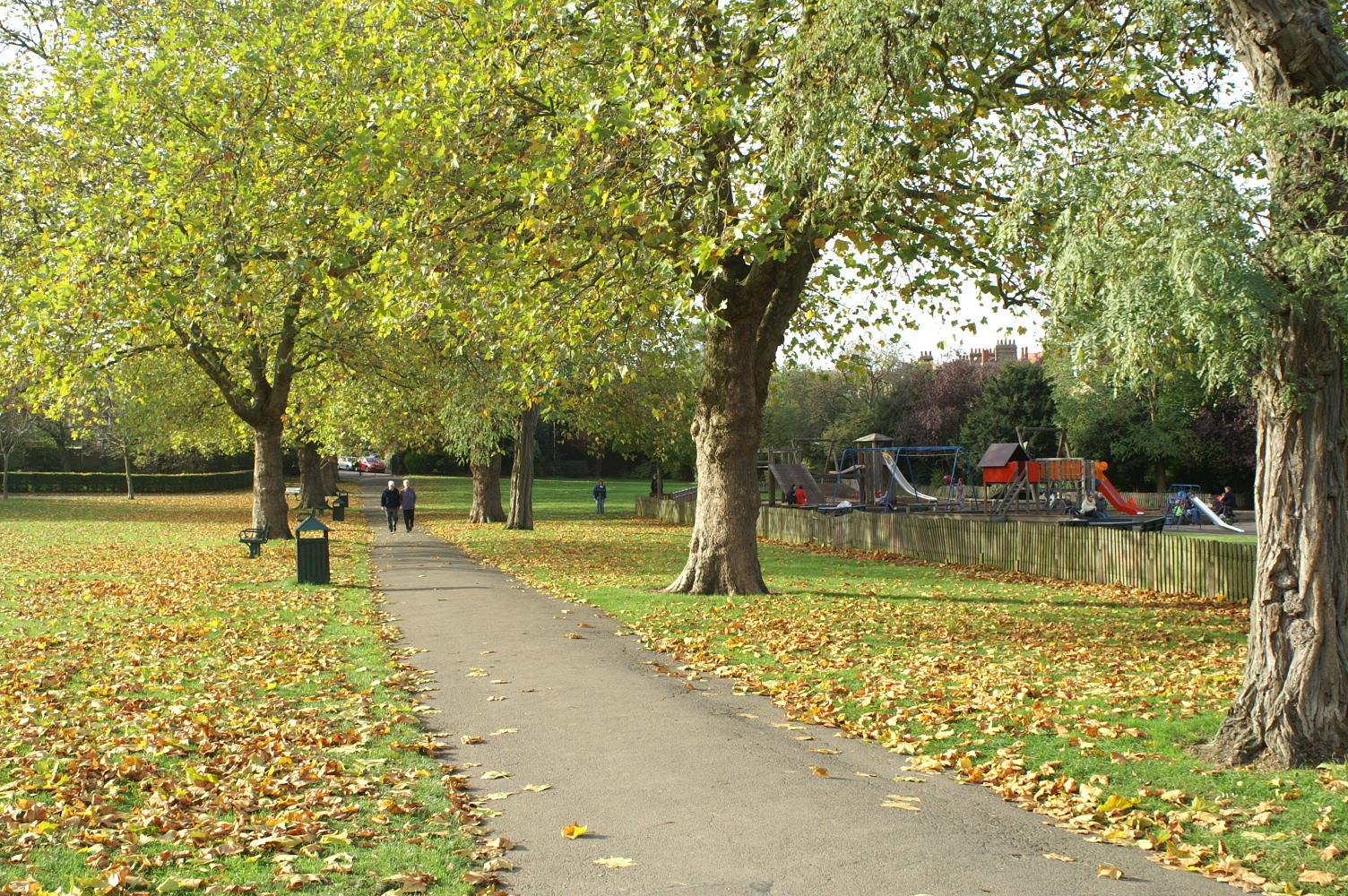
Priory Park, looking towards Abbeville Road

Priory Park is a 6.5-hectare public park in Hornsey, in the London Borough of Haringey. It is located between Priory Road and Middle Lane, approximately 0.5 km north of Crouch End Broadway. The park is protected as a Fields in Trust Queen Elizabeth II Field.

Priory Park is one of the most popular and frequently visited parks in Haringey. It has large open grassy spaces, an ornamental garden, tennis courts, Philosophers' Garden, paddling pool, café, playground, and large asphalt area for basket ball practice and junior cycling. It also has a Petanque (French Boules) court near the Pavilion.

It has won multiple Green Flag Awards since 2003, and has an active community group, the Friends of Priory Park.

The park contains a small wildlife pond hosting a sculpture called “the drop”, as well as a fountain made from Lamorna stone which was installed in 1909. This originally stood in St Paul's Cathedral churchyard.

This year sees the 100th Anniversary of the park.

== History ==
The park was created in two sections. Two parcels of land at the eastern and southern ends were purchased in 1891 by the Borough of Hornsey at the instigation of Henry Reader Williams and opened in 1896 as the Middle Lane Pleasure Grounds. In 1926 the western section was added after the acquisition of a piece of land known as Lewcock's Field. During World War 1 this had been requisitioned by the council for allotments. After the war an initial plan for the council to develop the field for housing was dropped on grounds of cost, and an expanded park was renamed Priory Park.
