= Malvern House London =

Coordinates: 51.5313°N 0.1173°W

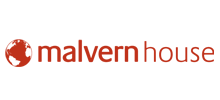
- Type: Academic Organisation
- Industry: English Language Teaching (General, Exam & Business) & University preparation
- Founded: London, 1999
- Headquarters: Central London
- Number of locations: 1
- Services: English Courses, General English, Exam English, and Fast Track Intensive English, University Pathways Courses (Foundation and Pre Masters)
- Website: malvern house

Malvern House London was founded in 1999. It is an independent college and was accredited by the British Council in 2003. In July 2009 Malvern House merged with AEC Education Group PLC. Malvern House London is the only private college in the UK that is listed on the London Stock Exchange.

The school specialises in teaching English for both long-term and short-term students wishing to study and learn English in London. The school also teaches long-term courses and professional qualifications such as Business English or courses which offer students entry into a UK university. The college comprises 22+ classrooms located in Central London (Kings Cross) and employs over 40 qualified teaching staff.

== History ==
1999 – Malvern House London is established. The Trafalgar Centre opens its doors to its first students wanting to learn English at affordable prices.

2002 – The Bloomsbury Centre opens in August 2002 incorporating Business English courses and giving students the opportunity to study at a UK university.

2003 – The Piccadilly Centre opens and becomes Malvern House's flagship study centre.

2006 – Malvern House launches the Fast Track intensive English course allowing students to learn English fast.

2006 – The University Pre-Masters Programme and Business Pathway courses are established. Malvern House commences its partnership with major UK universities such as Oxford Brooks University, Middlesex University, University of Leeds.

2009 – May – Malvern House merges with AEC Education Group.

2009 – The Kings Cross Centre opens in the heart of London's Kings Cross. The centre represents the future of Language learning in the UK, with all classrooms and student areas having all of the latest technology.

2011 - Piccadilly Centre upgraded successfully to mirror the excellent standards seen in Kings Cross (now the minimum standard adopted)

2012 - Adopts new place in UK market to better reflect standards of teaching and facilities.

2012 - Creates on-line learning platform to supplement classroom learning (Malvern House On-line Academy)

2012 - Develops 'virtual' Malvern House school for sales events and pre-course learning and assistance.

2025 - Malvern House London teachers request recognition of TEFL Workers' Union and ballot for strike action.

== Locations ==
Malvern House is located in the heart of London

- Kings Cross – 200 Pentonville Road, Kings Cross, London, N1 9JP UK
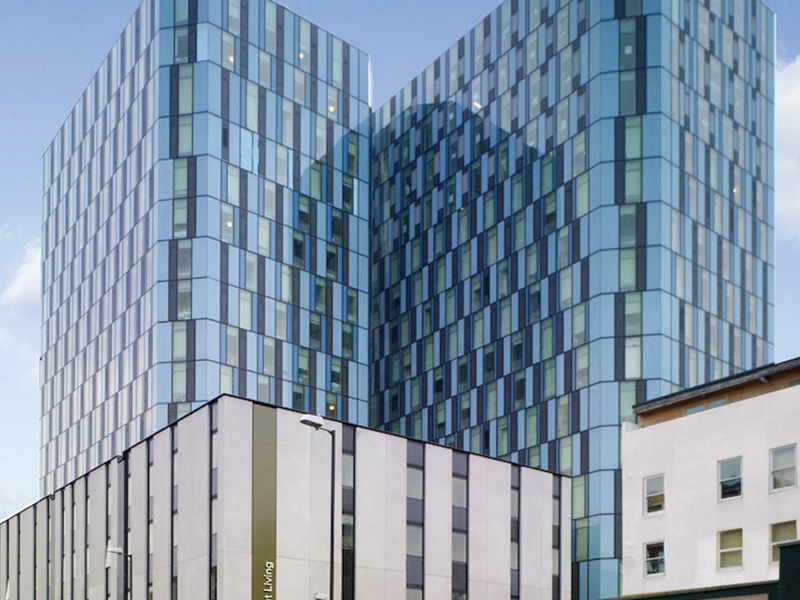
Kings Cross Centre

== Courses ==
Malvern House offers students courses in General, Business & Exam English, Work & Study and Fast Track Intensive English.

== Industrial Action ==
On August 12th 2025, teachers at Malvern House London formally requested union recognition with TEFL Workers' Union, part of the larger Industrial Workers of the World. When management failed "to provide a date for good-faith negotiations", the workers balloted for industrial action, with a strike ballot opening August 26th. At issue was the school's use of zero-hours contracts, the purportedly unfair dismissal of a long-serving teacher, and issues around payment for admin/preparation time and the distribution of hours.
