= List of schools in the London Borough of Islington =

This is a list of schools in the London Borough of Islington, England

In 2000, CEA, a private firm, took over the running of Islington's state schools. The education service returned to the Council in 2011. Islington schools have improved rapidly, with GCSE results in 2014 above both the national and London average. In 2010 GCSE results in the borough were 143rd out of 152 local authorities. By 2014 they had risen to 34th in the country.

== State-funded schools ==
=== Primary schools ===
- Ambler Primary School
- Ashmount Primary School
- Canonbury Primary School
- Christ the King RC Primary School
- City of London Primary Academy Islington
- Drayton Park Primary School
- Duncombe Primary School
- Gillespie Primary School
- Grafton Primary School
- Hanover Primary School
- Hargrave Park Primary School
- Highbury Quadrant Primary School
- Hugh Myddelton Primary School
- Hungerford School
- Laycock Primary School
- Montem Primary School
- Moreland Primary School
- The New North Academy
- Newington Green Primary School
- Pakeman Primary School
- Pooles Park Primary School
- Prior Weston Primary School
- Robert Blair Primary School
- Rotherfield Primary School
- Sacred Heart RC Primary School
- St Andrew's CE Primary School
- St Joan of Arc RC Primary School
- St John the Evangelist RC Primary School
- St John's Highbury Vale CE Primary School
- St John's Upper Holloway CE Primary School
- St Joseph's RC Primary School
- St Jude & St Paul's CE Primary School
- St Luke's CE Primary School
- St Mark's CE Primary School
- St Mary Magdalene Academy
- St Mary's CE Primary School
- St Peter & St Paul RC Primary School
- Thornhill Primary School
- Tufnell Park Primary School
- Vittoria Primary School
- Whitehall Park School
- William Tyndale Primary School
- Winton Primary School
- Yerbury Primary School

=== Secondary schools ===
- Arts and Media School, Islington
- Beacon High
- Central Foundation Boys' School
- City of London Academy Highbury Grove
- City of London Academy Highgate Hill
- City of London Academy Islington
- Elizabeth Garrett Anderson School
- Highbury Fields School
- St Aloysius' College
- St Mary Magdalene Academy

=== Special and alternative schools ===
- The Bridge Integrated Learning Space
- The Bridge School
- New River College Medical
- New River College Primary
- New River College Secondary
- The Pears Family School
- Richard Cloudesley School
- St Mary Magdalene Academy: the Courtyard
- Samuel Rhodes MLD School

=== Further education ===
- London Screen Academy
- City and Islington College
- Tech City College
- Central Foundation Boys School Sixth Form

== Independent schools ==
=== Primary and preparatory schools ===
- The Children's House Upper School
- Dallington School
- Dania School
- Rosemary Works School
- The Gower School
- St Paul's Steiner School

=== Senior and all-through schools ===
- North Bridge House Senior School

=== Further education ===
- Italia Conti Academy of Theatre Arts
- Malvern House London
- Musical Theatre Academy
