= Tottenham (constituency) =

Parliamentary constituency in the United Kingdom, 1950 onwards

- Borough constituency for the House of Commons
- Interactive map of boundaries from 2024
- Location within Greater London
- County: Greater London
- Electorate: 75,968 (March 2020)
- Major settlements: Tottenham

Current constituency
- Created: 1950
- Member of Parliament: David Lammy (Labour)
- Seats: One
- Created from: Tottenham North and Tottenham South

1885–1918
- Seats: One
- Type of constituency: Borough constituency
- Created from: Middlesex
- Replaced by: Tottenham North and Tottenham South

Tottenham (/ˈtɒtənəm/ TOT-ən-əm) is a constituency (Note: A borough constituency (for the purposes of election expenses and type of returning officer)) in Greater London represented in the House of Commons of the Parliament of the United Kingdom since 2000 by the former Deputy Prime Minister, David Lammy of the Labour Party, who also serves as Secretary of State for Justice and Lord High Chancellor of Great Britain. (Note: As with all constituencies, the constituency elects one Member of Parliament (MP) by the first past the post system of election that occurs at least every five years.) Lammy has previously served as Foreign Secretary from 2024 to 2025, and also served in the Shadow Cabinet of Keir Starmer, firstly as Shadow Secretary of State for Justice and Shadow Lord Chancellor from 2020 to 2021, and as the Shadow Foreign Secretary from 2021 to 2024.

Tottenham was re-created as a parliamentary constituency in 1950, having previously existed from 1885 to 1918.

== Constituency profile ==
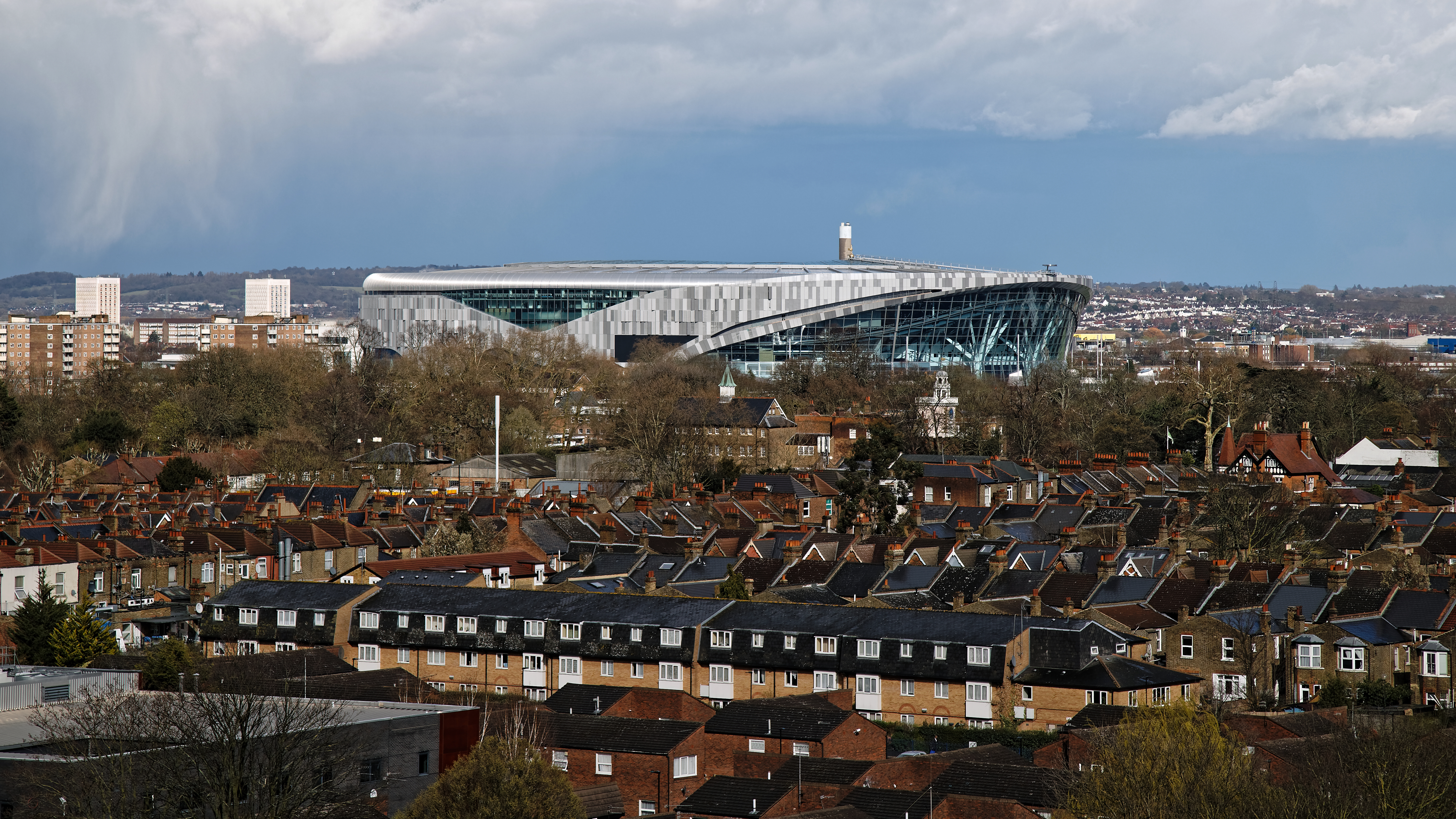
A view over Tottenham towards Tottenham Hotspur Stadium

Tottenham is a constituency in Greater London in England, mostly within the Borough of Haringey and partly within the Borough of Hackney. It covers the areas of Tottenham, Seven Sisters, Duckett's Green, Manor House and part of Harringay.

This is an urban constituency located around 6 miles (9.7 km) north of the centre of London. Tottenham was a small, rural settlement until the late 19th century when it was developed with low-cost housing for city workers. Today, Tottenham is a densely-populated, working-class suburb. It is one of the most deprived constituencies in the country and the vast majority of residents live in dense terraces, flats or shared houses. Many properties here are socially rented, especially in the Northumberland Park and Broadwater Farm estates, the latter of which was notorious for its 1985 riot. House prices across the constituency are generally lower than the London average.

Tottenham has a large young adult population and a very low proportion of retirees. Residents have low rates of income compared to the rest of London and very few are homeowners. The child poverty rate is above average. Residents have average levels of education and a high proportion work in the retail, education and arts sectors. The percentage claiming unemployment benefits is more than double the UK-wide rate.

Tottenham is an ethnically-diverse constituency. White people made up 47% of the population at the 2021 census, around half of whom were of non-British origin including large Italian, Spanish, Polish, Romanian, Bulgarian and Cypriot communities. Black people made up 25% of residents, Asians were 10% and other ethnic groups, including many Turks, were 12%. There is also a significant Jewish community here; they made up 4% of residents in 2021 but were nearly half the population in the south of the constituency close to Stamford Hill.

At the local borough council level, most of this constituency is represented by Green Party councillors, with some Labour Party representatives in the more deprived north. Voters in Tottenham strongly supported remaining in the European Union in the 2016 referendum; an estimated 68% voted to remain compared to the UK-wide figure of 48%.

== Boundaries ==
Map of boundaries 2010–2024

=== Historic ===
1885–1918: The parish of Tottenham (and the area included in the Parliamentary Boroughs of Bethnal Green, Hackney, Shoreditch, and Tower Hamlets; for many wealthy voters this sub-provision gave a choice of which seat to vote for).

1918–1950: The Tottenham area was represented by the Tottenham North and Tottenham South parliamentary constituencies.

1950–1974: The Borough of Tottenham wards of Bruce Grove and Stoneleigh, Chestnuts, Green Lanes, Stamford Hill, Town Hall, and West Green.

1974–1983: The Borough of Haringey wards of Bruce Grove, Green Lanes, High Cross, Seven Sisters, South Tottenham, Tottenham Central, and West Green.

1983–2010: As above plus Coleraine, Harringay, Park, and White Hart Lane.

2010–2024: Bruce Grove, Harringay, Northumberland Park, St Ann's, Seven Sisters, Tottenham Green, Tottenham Hale, West Green, White Hart Lane.

The constituency is in the London Borough of Haringey in north London, covering the borough's central and eastern area.

=== Current ===
Further to the 2023 review of Westminster constituencies, which came into effect for the 2024 general election, the constituency is composed of:

- The London Borough of Hackney wards of: Brownswood; Woodberry Down.
- The London Borough of Haringey wards of: Bruce Castle; Hermitage & Gardens; Northumberland Park; St Ann's; Seven Sisters; South Tottenham; Tottenham Central; Tottenham Hale; West Green.

The two Hackney wards were transferred from Hackney North and Stoke Newington. The contents in the Borough of Haringey reflect the local government boundary review which came into effect in May 2022. The Harringay and White Hart Lane wards were included in the new constituencies of Hornsey and Friern Barnet, and Southgate and Wood Green, respectively.

== History ==
=== 1885 to 1918 ===
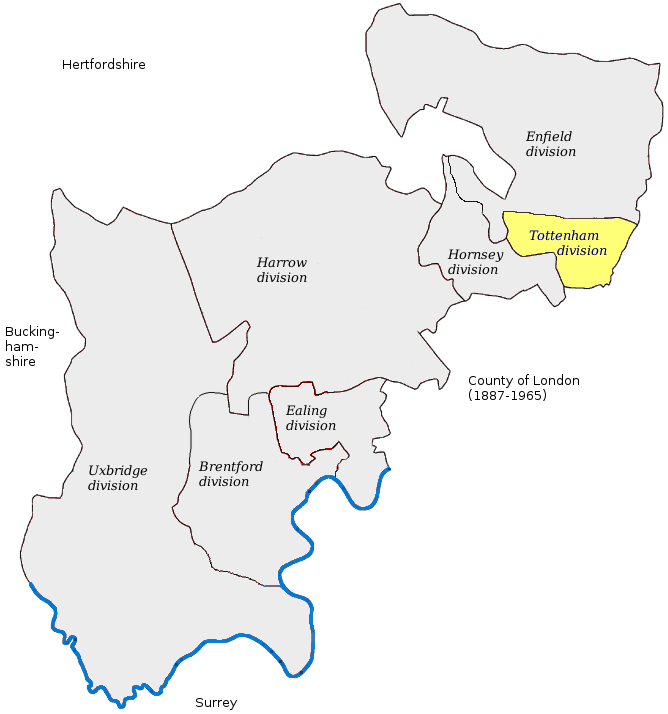
UK House of Commons seat Tottenham (first creation) created in 1885, before 1918 abolition, excluding Bethnal Green, Hackney, Shoreditch, and Tower Hamlets small exclaves.

Map that gives each named seat and any constant electoral success for national (Westminster) elections for Middlesex, 1955 to 1974.

The seat, aided by the choice to wealthy voters owning property in the eastern metropolitan divisions to the south of exercising "the county franchise" (see definition above) sided with the Conservative party candidate until the January-to-February-held 1906 election, a party noted for the gradual social reforms of Benjamin Disraeli in the early 1880s, particularly in education and urban deprivation. By the time of the 1906 United Kingdom general election the Liberal Party was at its final apex and stood on the moral high ground on issues of free trade and abhorrences in the Boer War which turned the seat in the Liberal landslide result of that year to the party's candidate. The two elections in 1910 (before a near eight-year long hiatus in elections due to World War I) were one-member parliamentary majority results nationally between the two then-dominant parties but the Liberal Party's People's Budget proposed at the first 1910 election saw Liberal incumbent Alden narrowly returned to serve Tottenham and again at the end of the year.

=== Since 1950 ===
This constituency was recreated to cover a narrower, more focussed seat on the largest town or London District itself, of Tottenham. Parts of two wards were in the former Borough of Hornsey which had a seat, abolished in 1983 to make way for Hornsey and Wood Green.

Political history

During its modern period of existence, Tottenham has been won consistently by the Labour Party; (Note: Most often since 1950 the Labour party candidate has achieved an absolute majority.) however, one member in the early 1960s, Alan Brown, defected to become independent in opposition (Note: During the Conservative Government 1957-1964) and then, crossing the floor, became a Conservative. Brown failed by a wide margin to win re-election in 1964. The closest result since 1950 was in 1987 when the Labour Party candidate Bernie Grant retained the seat by 8.2% of the vote ahead of the Conservatives. The first by-election to Tottenham occurred in 2000 due to Grant's death, which saw Labour, with new candidate David Lammy, retain the seat with a reduced majority.

In 1966, 12% of the constituency were born in the New Commonwealth. In 1971, 25.3% of the constituency were non-White. In 1981, 35.7% of the constituency were non-White. The constituency had the highest concentration of those born in the Mediterranean New Commonwealth (7.2% of the population) in 1981.

In 2005 and 2010 – reflecting a national swing – the runner-up was a Liberal Democrat candidate.

The re-election of Lammy in 2015 made the seat the twelfth-safest of Labour's 232 seats by percentage of majority; and third-safest in London. In 2017, Lammy was re-elected with 81.6% of the vote and a 70.1% majority, making Tottenham the safest seat for any party in Greater London.

At the 2016 EU referendum on continuing British membership of the European Union, 76.2% of the constituency voted to remain.

Prominent frontbenchers

David Lammy was the Minister of State for Higher Education and Intellectual Property from 2008 until Labour's defeat in the 2010 general election. Lammy served on the Shadow Cabinet as Shadow Justice Secretary and Shadow Lord Chancellor from 2020 until 2021, when he was reshuffled to serve as Shadow Secretary of State for Foreign, Commonwealth and Development Affairs.

== Members of Parliament ==
=== MPs 1885–1918 ===
| Election | Member | Party |
|---|---|---|
| 1885 | Joseph Howard | Conservative |
| 1906 | Percy Alden | Liberal |
| 1918 | constituency abolished: see Tottenham North and Tottenham South | |

=== MPs 1950–present ===
| Election | Member | Party |
|---|---|---|
| 1950 | Frederick Messer | Labour Co-op |
| 1959 | Alan Grahame Brown | Labour |
| 1961 | Alan Grahame Brown | Independent |
| 1962 | Alan Grahame Brown | Conservative |
| 1964 | Norman Atkinson | Labour |
| 1987 | Bernie Grant | Labour |
| 2000 by-election | David Lammy | Labour |

== Elections ==
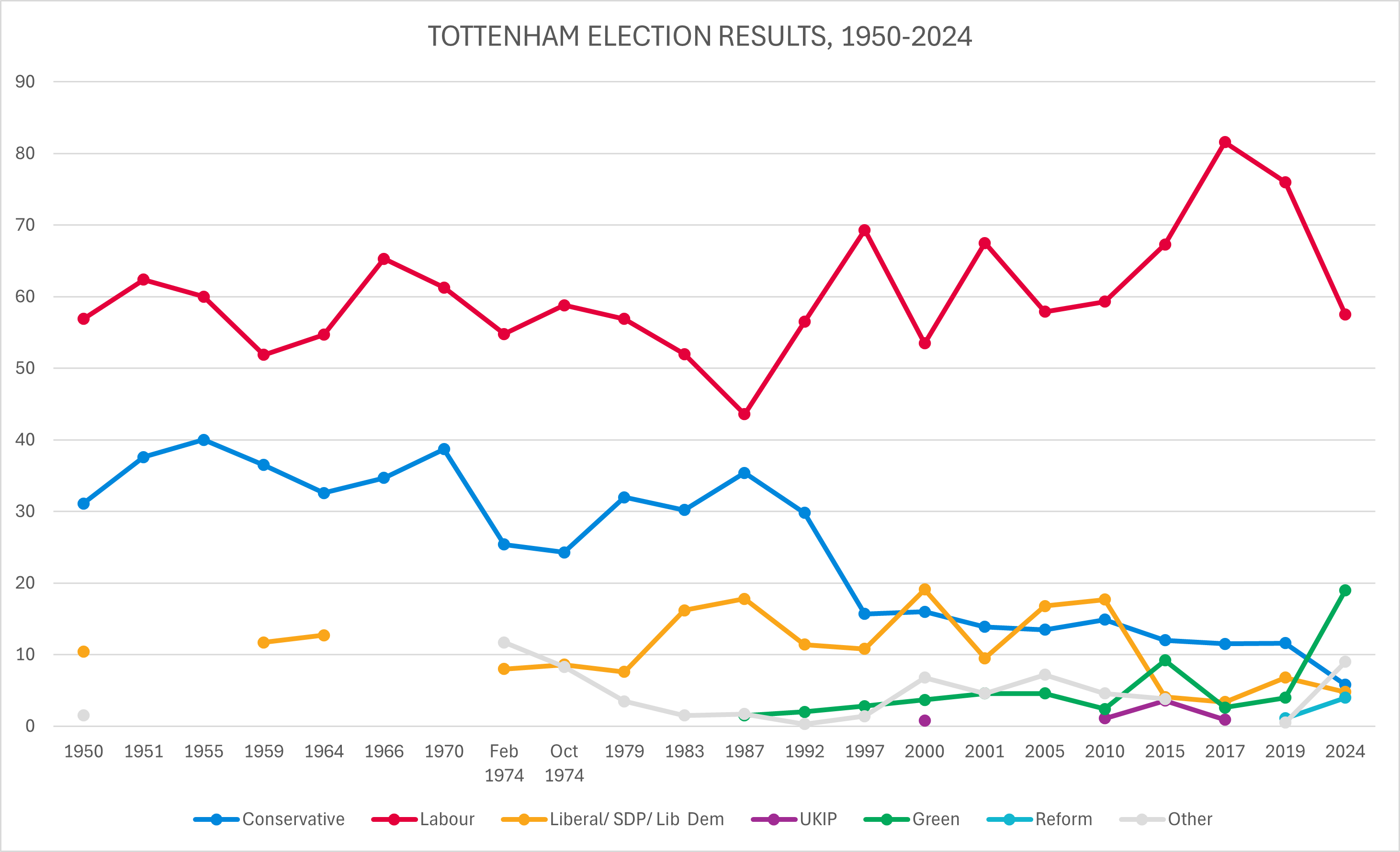
Election results 1950–2024

=== Elections in the 2020s ===
General election 2024: Tottenham
| Party | Candidate | Votes | % | ±% |
|---|---|---|---|---|
| Labour | David Lammy | 23,066 | 57.5 | −20.3 |
| Green | David Craig | 7,632 | 19.0 | +14.7 |
| Independent | Nandita Lal | 2,348 | 5.8 | N/A |
| Conservative | Attic Rahman | 2,320 | 5.8 | −5.3 |
| Liberal Democrats | Hari Prabu | 1,928 | 4.8 | −0.2 |
| Reform | Roger Gravett | 1,602 | 4.0 | +2.7 |
| Workers Party | Jennifer Obaseki | 659 | 1.6 | N/A |
| Rejoin EU | Andrew Miles | 306 | 0.8 | N/A |
| CPA | Amelia Allao | 224 | 0.6 | N/A |
| Communist League | Pamela Holmes | 63 | 0.2 | +0.1 |
| Majority | | 15,434 | 38.4 | −26.0 |
| Turnout | | 40,148 | 52.9 | −7.3 |
| Registered electors | | 75,906 | | |
| Labour hold | | Swing | −17.5 | |

=== Elections in the 2010s ===
2019 notional result
| Party | Vote | % |
|---|---|---|
| Labour | 35,564 | 77.8 |
| Conservative | 5,076 | 11.1 |
| Liberal Democrats | 2,306 | 5.0 |
| Green | 1,965 | 4.3 |
| Brexit Party | 588 | 1.3 |
| Others | 221 | 0.5 |
| Turnout | 45,720 | 60.2 |
| Electorate | 75,968 | |

General election 2019: Tottenham
| Party | Candidate | Votes | % | ±% |
|---|---|---|---|---|
| Labour | David Lammy | 35,621 | 76.0 | −5.6 |
| Conservative | James Newhall | 5,446 | 11.6 | +0.1 |
| Liberal Democrats | Tammy Palmer | 3,168 | 6.8 | +3.4 |
| Green | Emma Chan | 1,873 | 4.0 | +1.4 |
| Brexit Party | Abdul Turay | 527 | 1.1 | N/A |
| SDP | Andrew Bence | 91 | 0.2 | N/A |
| Workers Revolutionary | Frank Sweeney | 88 | 0.2 | N/A |
| Communist League | Jonathan Silberman | 42 | 0.1 | N/A |
| Majority | | 30,175 | 64.4 | −5.7 |
| Turnout | | 46,856 | 61.9 | −5.8 |
| Registered electors | | 75,740 | | |
| Labour hold | | Swing | −2.9 | |

General election 2017: Tottenham
| Party | Candidate | Votes | % | ±% |
|---|---|---|---|---|
| Labour | David Lammy | 40,249 | 81.6 | +14.3 |
| Conservative | Myles Stacey | 5,665 | 11.5 | −0.5 |
| Liberal Democrats | Brian Haley | 1,687 | 3.4 | −0.7 |
| Green | Jarelle Francis | 1,276 | 2.6 | −6.6 |
| UKIP | Patricia Rumble | 462 | 0.9 | −2.7 |
| Majority | | 34,584 | 70.1 | +14.8 |
| Turnout | | 49,339 | 67.7 | +7.6 |
| Registered electors | | 72,884 | | |
| Labour hold | | Swing | +7.4 | |

General election 2015: Tottenham
| Party | Candidate | Votes | % | ±% |
|---|---|---|---|---|
| Labour | David Lammy | 28,654 | 67.3 | +8.0 |
| Conservative | Stefan Mrozinski | 5,090 | 12.0 | −2.9 |
| Green | Dee Searle | 3,931 | 9.2 | +6.8 |
| Liberal Democrats | Turhan Ozen | 1,756 | 4.1 | −13.6 |
| UKIP | Tariq Saeed | 1,512 | 3.6 | +2.5 |
| TUSC | Jenny Sutton | 1,324 | 3.1 | +0.5 |
| Peace | Tania Mahmood | 291 | 0.7 | N/A |
| Majority | | 23,564 | 55.3 | +13.7 |
| Turnout | | 42,558 | 60.1 | +1.9 |
| Registered electors | | 70,803 | | |
| Labour hold | | Swing | +5.4 | |

General election 2010: Tottenham
| Party | Candidate | Votes | % | ±% |
|---|---|---|---|---|
| Labour | David Lammy | 24,128 | 59.3 | +1.4 |
| Liberal Democrats | David Schmitz | 7,197 | 17.7 | +0.9 |
| Conservative | Sean Sullivan | 6,064 | 14.9 | +1.4 |
| TUSC | Jenny Sutton | 1,057 | 2.6 | N/A |
| Green | Anne Gray | 980 | 2.4 | −2.2 |
| UKIP | Winston McKenzie | 466 | 1.1 | N/A |
| Independent People Together | Neville Watson | 265 | 0.7 | N/A |
| Christian | Abimbola Kadara | 262 | 0.6 | N/A |
| Independent | Sheik Thompson | 143 | 0.4 | N/A |
| Independent | Errol Carr | 125 | 0.3 | N/A |
| Majority | | 16,931 | 41.6 | +0.5 |
| Turnout | | 40,687 | 58.2 | +10.4 |
| Registered electors | | 68,834 | | |
| Labour hold | | Swing | +0.2 | |

=== Elections in the 2000s ===
General election 2005: Tottenham
| Party | Candidate | Votes | % | ±% |
|---|---|---|---|---|
| Labour | David Lammy | 18,343 | 57.9 | −9.6 |
| Liberal Democrats | Wayne Hoban | 5,309 | 16.8 | +7.3 |
| Conservative | William F. MacDougall | 4,278 | 13.5 | −0.4 |
| Respect | Janet Alder | 2,014 | 6.4 | N/A |
| Green | Pete H. McAskie | 1,457 | 4.6 | ±0.0 |
| Socialist Labour | Jaamit Durrani | 263 | 0.8 | N/A |
| Majority | | 13,034 | 41.1 | −12.5 |
| Turnout | | 31,664 | 47.8 | −0.4 |
| Registered electors | | 66,238 | | |
| Labour hold | | Swing | −8.4 | |

General election 2001: Tottenham
| Party | Candidate | Votes | % | ±% |
|---|---|---|---|---|
| Labour | David Lammy | 21,317 | 67.5 | −1.8 |
| Conservative | Uma N. Fernandes | 4,401 | 13.9 | −1.8 |
| Liberal Democrats | Meher Khan | 3,008 | 9.5 | −1.3 |
| Green | Peter Budge | 1,443 | 4.6 | +1.8 |
| Socialist Alliance | Weyman Bennett | 1,162 | 3.7 | N/A |
| Reform 2000 | Unver T. Shefki | 270 | 0.9 | N/A |
| Majority | | 16,916 | 53.6 | ±0.0 |
| Turnout | | 31,601 | 48.2 | −8.7 |
| Registered electors | | 65,568 | | |
| Labour hold | | Swing | ±0.0 | |

2000 Tottenham by-election
| Party | Candidate | Votes | % | ±% |
|---|---|---|---|---|
| Labour | David Lammy | 8,785 | 53.5 | −15.8 |
| Liberal Democrats | Duncan Hames | 3,139 | 19.1 | +7.3 |
| Conservative | Jane Ellison | 2,634 | 16.0 | +0.3 |
| Socialist Alliance | Weyman Bennett | 885 | 5.4 | N/A |
| Green | Peter Budge | 606 | 3.7 | +0.9 |
| Reform 2000 | Erol Basarik | 177 | 1.1 | N/A |
| UKIP | Ashwin Tanna | 136 | 0.8 | N/A |
| Independent | Dorian L.D. de Braâm | 55 | 0.3 | N/A |
| Majority | | 5,646 | 34.4 | −19.2 |
| Turnout | | 16,417 | 25.4 | −31.5 |
| Registered electors | | 64,554 | | |
| Labour hold | | Swing | −12.0 | |

=== Elections in the 1990s ===
General election 1997: Tottenham
| Party | Candidate | Votes | % | ±% |
|---|---|---|---|---|
| Labour | Bernie Grant | 26,121 | 69.3 | +12.8 |
| Conservative | Andrew R. Scantlebury | 5,921 | 15.7 | −14.1 |
| Liberal Democrats | Neil Hughes | 4,064 | 10.8 | −0.6 |
| Green | Peter Budge | 1,059 | 2.8 | +0.8 |
| ProLife Alliance | Leelan L.E. Tay | 210 | 0.5 | N/A |
| Workers Revolutionary | Christopher F. Anglin | 181 | 0.5 | N/A |
| Socialist Equality | Tania Kent | 148 | 0.4 | N/A |
| Majority | | 20,200 | 53.6 | +26.9 |
| Turnout | | 37,704 | 56.9 | −8.7 |
| Registered electors | | 66,251 | | |
| Labour hold | | Swing | +13.4 | |

General election 1992: Tottenham
| Party | Candidate | Votes | % | ±% |
|---|---|---|---|---|
| Labour | Bernie Grant | 25,309 | 56.5 | +12.9 |
| Conservative | Andrew Charalambous | 13,341 | 29.8 | −5.6 |
| Liberal Democrats | Alex S.G. l'Estrange | 5,120 | 11.4 | −6.4 |
| Green | Peter Budge | 903 | 2.0 | +0.5 |
| Natural Law | Margaret Obomanu | 150 | 0.3 | N/A |
| Majority | | 11,698 | 26.7 | +18.5 |
| Turnout | | 44,823 | 65.6 | −0.5 |
| Registered electors | | 68,319 | | |
| Labour hold | | Swing | | |

=== Elections in the 1980s ===
General election 1987: Tottenham
| Party | Candidate | Votes | % | ±% |
|---|---|---|---|---|
| Labour | Bernie Grant | 21,921 | 43.6 | −8.4 |
| Conservative | Peter Murphy | 17,780 | 35.4 | +5.2 |
| Liberal | Stuart Etherington | 8,983 | 17.8 | +1.6 |
| Green | Darren Nicholls | 744 | 1.5 | N/A |
| Gaitskell Labour | Peter Nealon | 638 | 1.3 | N/A |
| Workers Revolutionary | Claire Dixon | 205 | 0.4 | N/A |
| Majority | | 4,141 | 8.2 | −13.6 |
| Turnout | | 50,271 | 66.1 | +2.7 |
| Registered electors | | 76,092 | | |
| Labour hold | | Swing | | |

General election 1983: Tottenham
| Party | Candidate | Votes | % | ±% |
|---|---|---|---|---|
| Labour | Norman Atkinson | 22,423 | 52.0 | −4.9 |
| Conservative | Peter L. Murphy | 13,027 | 30.2 | −1.8 |
| Liberal | Alex S.G. l'Estrange | 6,990 | 16.2 | +8.6 |
| Ind. Conservative | W.G. Hurry | 652 | 1.5 | N/A |
| Majority | | 9,396 | 21.8 | −3.1 |
| Turnout | | 43,092 | 63.4 | +2.2 |
| Registered electors | | 67,944 | | |
| Labour hold | | Swing | −1.6 | |

=== Elections in the 1970s ===
General election 1979: Tottenham
| Party | Candidate | Votes | % | ±% |
|---|---|---|---|---|
| Labour | Norman Atkinson | 16,299 | 56.9 | −1.9 |
| Conservative | Matthew Carrington | 9,166 | 32.0 | +7.7 |
| Liberal | Katherine Alexander | 2,177 | 7.6 | −1.0 |
| National Front | Colin Mates | 833 | 2.9 | −5.4 |
| Workers Revolutionary | Eric D.J. Gutteridge | 94 | 0.3 | N/A |
| Fellowship | Geoffrey A. Rolph | 71 | 0.3 | N/A |
| Majority | | 7,133 | 24.9 | −9.6 |
| Turnout | | 28,640 | 61.2 | +5.0 |
| Registered electors | | 46,821 | | |
| Labour hold | | Swing | −4.8 | |

General election October 1974: Tottenham
| Party | Candidate | Votes | % | ±% |
|---|---|---|---|---|
| Labour | Norman Atkinson | 15,708 | 58.8 | +4.0 |
| Conservative | Peter Lilley | 6,492 | 24.3 | −1.1 |
| Liberal | Katherine Alexander | 2,288 | 8.6 | +0.6 |
| National Front | Roy Painter | 2,211 | 8.3 | +4.2 |
| Majority | | 9,216 | 34.5 | +5.1 |
| Turnout | | 26,699 | 56.2 | −9.4 |
| Registered electors | | 47,530 | | |
| Labour hold | | Swing | +2.6 | |

General election February 1974: Tottenham
| Party | Candidate | Votes | % | ±% |
|---|---|---|---|---|
| Labour | Norman Atkinson | 16,999 | 54.8 | −6.5 |
| Conservative | J.A. Croft | 7,873 | 25.4 | −13.3 |
| Liberal | K. Papatheodotou | 2,478 | 8.0 | N/A |
| National Independence | P. Coney | 1,373 | 4.2 | N/A |
| National Front | Roy Painter | 1,270 | 4.1 | N/A |
| Social Democrat | J. Martin | 763 | 2.5 | N/A |
| Ind. Conservative | K. Squire | 274 | 0.9 | N/A |
| Majority | | 9,126 | 29.4 | +6.8 |
| Turnout | | 31,030 | 65.6 | +10.4 |
| Registered electors | | 47,289 | | |
| Labour hold | | Swing | +3.4 | |

General election 1970: Tottenham
| Party | Candidate | Votes | % | ±% |
|---|---|---|---|---|
| Labour | Norman Atkinson | 17,367 | 61.3 | −4.0 |
| Conservative | Leo T Simmonds | 10,975 | 38.7 | +4.0 |
| Majority | | 6,392 | 22.6 | −8.0 |
| Turnout | | 28,342 | 55.2 | −4.6 |
| Registered electors | | 51,295 | | |
| Labour hold | | Swing | −4.0 | |

=== Elections in the 1960s ===
General election 1966: Tottenham
| Party | Candidate | Votes | % | ±% |
|---|---|---|---|---|
| Labour | Norman Atkinson | 17,367 | 65.3 | +10.6 |
| Conservative | Hugh Dykes | 11,222 | 34.7 | +2.1 |
| Majority | | 9,889 | 30.6 | +8.5 |
| Turnout | | 28,589 | 59.8 | −4.1 |
| Registered electors | | 54,079 | | |
| Labour hold | | Swing | +4.3 | |

General election 1964: Tottenham
| Party | Candidate | Votes | % | ±% |
|---|---|---|---|---|
| Labour | Norman Atkinson | 19,458 | 54.7 | +2.8 |
| Conservative | Alan Grahame Brown | 11,577 | 32.6 | −3.9 |
| Liberal | Laurence G Lepley | 4,526 | 12.7 | +1.0 |
| Majority | | 7,881 | 22.1 | +6.7 |
| Turnout | | 35,561 | 63.9 | −8.1 |
| Registered electors | | 55,644 | | |
| Labour hold | | Swing | +3.4 | |

=== Elections in the 1950s ===
General election 1959: Tottenham
| Party | Candidate | Votes | % | ±% |
|---|---|---|---|---|
| Labour | Alan Grahame Brown | 22,325 | 51.9 | −8.1 |
| Conservative | David Hennessy | 15,688 | 36.5 | −3.5 |
| Liberal | Laurence G Lepley | 5,030 | 11.7 | N/A |
| Majority | | 6,637 | 15.4 | −4.6 |
| Turnout | | 43,043 | 72.0 | +1.8 |
| Registered electors | | 59,794 | | |
| Labour hold | | Swing | −2.3 | |

General election 1955: Tottenham
| Party | Candidate | Votes | % | ±% |
|---|---|---|---|---|
| Labour Co-op | Frederick Messer | 26,363 | 60.0 | −2.4 |
| Conservative | Ian Fraser | 17,753 | 40.0 | +2.4 |
| Majority | | 8,883 | 20.0 | −4.8 |
| Turnout | | 44,116 | 70.2 | −9.6 |
| Registered electors | | 63,242 | | |
| Labour hold | | Swing | −2.4 | |

General election 1951: Tottenham
| Party | Candidate | Votes | % | ±% |
|---|---|---|---|---|
| Labour Co-op | Frederick Messer | 33,312 | 62.4 | +5.5 |
| Conservative | Patrick J Faulkner | 20,061 | 37.6 | +6.5 |
| Majority | | 13,251 | 24.8 | −1.1 |
| Turnout | | 53,373 | 79.8 | −1.2 |
| Registered electors | | 66,866 | | |
| Labour hold | | Swing | −0.5 | |

General election 1950: Tottenham
| Party | Candidate | Votes | % | ±% |
|---|---|---|---|---|
| Labour Co-op | Frederick Messer | 30,901 | 56.9 | |
| Conservative | Patrick J Faulkner | 16,862 | 31.1 | |
| Liberal | Richard De Courcy Allen | 5,665 | 10.4 | |
| Communist | George Cross | 802 | 1.5 | |
| Majority | | 14,039 | 25.9 | |
| Turnout | | 54,230 | 81.0 | |
| Registered electors | | 66,943 | | |
| Labour win (new seat) | | | | |

=== Elections in the 1910s ===
Percy Alden

General election December 1910: Tottenham
| Party | Candidate | Votes | % | ±% |
|---|---|---|---|---|
| Liberal | Percy Alden | 12,046 | 52.4 | +1.3 |
| Conservative | Edward Vyse Sturdy | 10,945 | 47.6 | −1.3 |
| Majority | | 1,101 | 4.8 | +2.6 |
| Turnout | | 22,991 | 78.6 | −3.7 |
| Registered electors | | 29,260 | | |
| Liberal hold | | Swing | +1.3 | |

General election January 1910: Tottenham
| Party | Candidate | Votes | % | ±% |
|---|---|---|---|---|
| Liberal | Percy Alden | 12,302 | 51.1 | −7.6 |
| Conservative | Edward Vyse Sturdy | 11,787 | 48.9 | +7.6 |
| Majority | | 515 | 2.2 | −15.2 |
| Turnout | | 24,089 | 82.3 | +9.8 |
| Registered electors | | 29,260 | | |
| Liberal hold | | Swing | −7.6 | |

=== Elections in the 1900s ===
General election 1906: Tottenham
| Party | Candidate | Votes | % | ±% |
|---|---|---|---|---|
| Liberal | Percy Alden | 9,956 | 58.7 | +21.3 |
| Conservative | Horace Whitehead Chatterton | 7,009 | 41.3 | −21.3 |
| Majority | | 2,947 | 17.4 | N/A |
| Turnout | | 16,965 | 72.5 | +17.2 |
| Registered electors | | 23,409 | | |
| Liberal gain from Conservative | | Swing | +21.3 | |

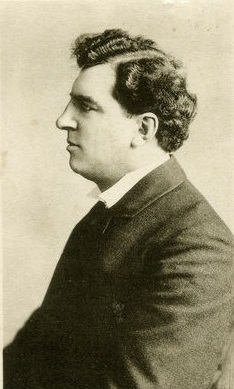
Hay Morgan

General election 1900: Tottenham
| Party | Candidate | Votes | % | ±% |
|---|---|---|---|---|
| Conservative | Joseph Howard | 6,721 | 62.6 | ±0.0 |
| Liberal | George Hay Morgan | 4,009 | 37.4 | ±0.0 |
| Majority | | 2,712 | 25.2 | ±0.0 |
| Turnout | | 10,730 | 55.3 | −3.5 |
| Registered electors | | 19,412 | | |
| Conservative hold | | Swing | ±0.0 | |

=== Elections in the 1890s ===
General election 1895: Tottenham
| Party | Candidate | Votes | % | ±% |
|---|---|---|---|---|
| Conservative | Joseph Howard | 6,388 | 62.6 | +3.9 |
| Lib-Lab | Clement Edwards | 3,817 | 37.4 | −3.9 |
| Majority | | 2,571 | 25.2 | +7.8 |
| Turnout | | 10,205 | 58.8 | −4.0 |
| Registered electors | | 17,346 | | |
| Conservative hold | | Swing | +3.9 | |

General election 1892: Tottenham
| Party | Candidate | Votes | % | ±% |
|---|---|---|---|---|
| Conservative | Joseph Howard | 5,794 | 58.7 | −7.0 |
| Liberal | Thomas Henry Chance | 4,074 | 41.3 | +7.0 |
| Majority | | 1,720 | 17.4 | −14.0 |
| Turnout | | 9,868 | 62.8 | +7.7 |
| Registered electors | | 15,716 | | |
| Conservative hold | | Swing | −7.0 | |

=== Elections in the 1880s ===
General election 1886: Tottenham
| Party | Candidate | Votes | % | ±% |
|---|---|---|---|---|
| Conservative | Joseph Howard | 3,941 | 65.7 | +11.2 |
| Liberal | Charles Edward Bretherton | 2,062 | 34.3 | −11.2 |
| Majority | | 1,879 | 31.4 | +22.4 |
| Turnout | | 6,003 | 55.1 | −19.7 |
| Registered electors | | 10,887 | | |
| Conservative hold | | Swing | +11.2 | |

General election 1885: Tottenham
| Party | Candidate | Votes | % | ±% |
|---|---|---|---|---|
| Conservative | Joseph Howard | 4,441 | 54.5 | |
| Liberal | William Sproston Caine | 3,706 | 45.5 | |
| Majority | | 735 | 9.0 | |
| Turnout | | 8,147 | 74.8 | |
| Registered electors | | 10,887 | | |
| Conservative win (new seat) | | | | |

== See also ==
- 2000 Tottenham by-election
- List of parliamentary constituencies in London

== Notes ==
Parliament of the United Kingdom
| In abeyance David Cameron sat in the House of Lords during his tenure Title last held by Braintree | Constituency represented by the foreign secretary 2024–2025 | Succeeded by Pontefract, Castleford and Knottingley |
