= Tottenham Green (ward) =

Electoral ward in the London borough of Haringey

Coordinates: 51.586°N 0.073°W

- Former electoral ward for the Haringey London Borough Council
- Tottenham Green ward boundaries
- Borough: Haringey
- County: Greater London
- Population: 14,580 (2011)
- Electorate: 10,702 (2018)
- Major settlements: Tottenham and Seven Sisters
- Area: 1.4 square kilometres (0.54 sq mi)

Former electoral ward
- Created: 2002
- Abolished: 2022
- Councillors: 3
- Replaced by: Seven Sisters; South Tottenham; Tottenham Central; West Green
- ONS code: 00APGQ
- GSS code: E05000280

Tottenham Green was an electoral ward in the London Borough of Haringey from 2002 to 2022. The ward was first used in the 2002 elections and last used at the 2018 elections. It returned three councillors to Haringey London Borough Council. The ward was only represented by Labour Party councillors.

== List of councillors ==
Seat	Councillor	Took office	Left office	Party	Election
1	Harry Lister	2002	2010	Labour	2002, 2006
2	Isidores Diakides	2002	2022	Labour	2002 ... 2018
3	Reginald Rice	2002	2006	Labour	2002
3	Bernice Vanier	2006	2018	Labour	2006, 2010, 2014
1	Richard Watson	2010	2014	Labour	2010
1	Makbule Gunes	2014	2022	Labour	2014, 2018
3	Preston Tabois	2018	2022	Labour	2018

== Haringey council elections ==
=== 2018 election ===
The election took place on 3 May 2018.

2018 Haringey London Borough Council election: Tottenham Green
Party	Candidate	Votes	%	±%
Labour	Isidoros Diakides	2,432	72.7	+14.8
Labour	Makbule Gunes	2,342	70.0	+12.5
Labour	Preston Tabois	2,306	69.0	+13.3
Green	Cecily Hope Spelling	431	12.9	−6.7
Green	Rosa Nerine Fass	420	12.6	−4.9
Conservative	Daniel Babis	266	8.0	−3.2
Conservative	Jeannette Pinnock	241	7.2	−1.1
Liberal Democrats	Henry Fisher	234	7.0	+0.1
Green	Eva Martina Weitsch	231	6.9	−6.6
Liberal Democrats	Elena Sandrini	228	6.8	+1.4
Conservative	Matt Jama	214	6.4	−0.6
Liberal Democrats	Nigel Scott	177	5.3	+0.2
Federalist Party	Alex Gunter	44	1.3	N/A
Turnout		3,351	31.31	−0.59
Labour hold		Swing		
Labour hold		Swing		
Labour hold		Swing		

=== 2014 election ===
The election took place on 22 May 2014.

2014 Haringey London Borough Council election: Tottenham Green
Party	Candidate	Votes	%	±%
Labour	Isidoros Diakides	1,808	57.9	−0.8
Labour	Makbule Gunes	1,795	57.5	+6.2
Labour	Bernice Vanier	1,741	55.7	−1.3
Green	Judith Hanna	611	19.6	+8.6
Green	John Dixon	546	17.5	+7.6
Green	Chris Henderson	421	13.5	+2.8
Conservative	Agnieszka Bielecka	351	11.2	+0.5
Conservative	George Dristas	260	8.3	−1.8
TUSC	Patrick Cook	235	7.5	N/A
Conservative	Denis Lobidel	219	7.0	−2.4
Liberal Democrats	Neville Collins	216	6.9	−13.0
TUSC	Gary McFarlane	199	6.4	N/A
Liberal Democrats	Robbie Cowbury	170	5.4	−10.3
Liberal Democrats	Kathy Riddle	158	5.1	−9.8
Turnout		3,148	31.90	−17.3
Labour hold		Swing		
Labour hold		Swing		
Labour hold		Swing		

=== 2010 election ===
The election on 6 May 2010 took place on the same day as the United Kingdom general election.

2010 Haringey London Borough Council election: Tottenham Green
Party	Candidate	Votes	%	±%
Labour	Isidoros Diakides	2,643	58.7	+4.5
Labour	Bernice Vanier	2,565	57.0	+5.6
Labour	Richard Watson	2,310	51.3	+0.3
Liberal Democrats	Nicholas da Costa	898	19.9	−0.1
Liberal Democrats	Asha Kaur	707	15.7	−0.6
Liberal Democrats	Alex Sweet	669	14.9	+3.7
Green	Jill Boswell	494	11.0	−6.6
Conservative	Susan Hinchcliffe	483	10.7	−3.7
Green	Emily Slater	482	10.7	N/A
Conservative	William Hoyle	454	10.1	−4.6
Green	John Dixon	448	9.9	N/A
Conservative	James Orpin	422	9.4	−1.4
Independent	Neville Watson	210	4.7	N/A
Turnout		4,528	49.2	+22.3
Labour hold		Swing		
Labour hold		Swing		
Labour hold		Swing		

=== 2006 election ===
The election took place on 4 May 2006.

2006 Haringey London Borough Council election: Tottenham Green (3)
Party	Candidate	Votes	%	±%
Labour	Isidoros Diakides	1,180	54.2	+1.1
Labour	Bernice Vanier	1,119	51.4	−0.7
Labour	Harry Lister	1,111	51.0	−5.2
Liberal Democrats	Jill Gale	436	20.0	+8.8
Green	Christopher Madden	383	17.6	+2.2
Liberal Democrats	Francis Lay	356	16.3	+6.2
Conservative	Jonathan Howard	321	14.7	+2.1
Conservative	Susan Hinchcliffe	313	14.4	+2.7
Liberal Democrats	Zarko Stefan	243	11.2	+1.8
Conservative	James Orpin	236	10.8	+0.9
Independent	Frederick Woodward	85	3.9	−1.8
Independent	Salah Wakie	81	3.7	−0.3
Turnout		2,191	26.9	+4.4
Labour hold		Swing		
Labour hold		Swing		
Labour hold		Swing		

=== 2002 election ===
The election took place on 2 May 2002.

2002 Haringey London Borough Council election: Tottenham Green
Party	Candidate	Votes	%	±%
Labour	Harry Lister	974	56.2	
Labour	Isidores Diakides	920	53.1	
Labour	Reginald Rice	903	52.1	
Green	Suzy Almond	266	15.4	
Conservative	Judith Flynn	218	12.6	
Independent	Perdeep Gill	211	12.2	
Conservative	Georgina Walden	202	11.7	
Liberal Democrats	David Burridge	194	11.2	
Liberal Democrats	Ryan Cockman	175	10.1	
Conservative	James Orpin	172	9.9	
Liberal Democrats	Richard Stevens	163	9.4	
Socialist Alliance	Weyman Bennett	159	9.2	
Socialist Alliance	Frederick Woodward	99	5.7	
Independent	Salah Wakie	69	4.0	
Turnout		1,738	22.5	
Labour win (new seat)				
Labour win (new seat)				
Labour win (new seat)				
