= Northumberland Park (ward) =

Electoral ward in London, England

- Electoral ward for the Haringey London Borough Council
- Northumberland Park ward boundaries since 2022
- Borough: Haringey
- County: Greater London
- Population: 14,705 (2021) (Note: 2021 Census data reported for 2022 ward boundaries)
- Major settlements: Northumberland Park
- Area: 1.975 km²

Current electoral ward
- Created: 2002
- Number of members: 3
- Councillors: John Bevan; Kaushika Amin; Ajda Ovat
- GSS code: E05000276 (2002–2022); E05013596 (since 2022)

Northumberland Park is an electoral ward in the London Borough of Haringey. The ward was first used in the 2002 elections and elects three councillors to Haringey London Borough Council.

== Councillors ==
Election	Councillor	Councillor	Councillor
2002	Sheila Peacock (Lab)	John Bevan (Lab)	Ray Dodds (Lab)
2006	Sheila Peacock (Lab)	John Bevan (Lab)	Kaushika Amin (Lab)
2010	Sheila Peacock (Lab)	John Bevan (Lab)	Kaushika Amin (Lab)
2014	Sheila Peacock (Lab)	John Bevan (Lab)	Kaushika Amin (Lab)
2018	Sheila Peacock (Lab)	John Bevan (Lab)	Kaushika Amin (Lab)
2022	Ajda Ovat (Lab)	John Bevan (Lab)	Kaushika Amin (Lab)
2026	Jayon Henriques (Grn)	John Bevan (Lab)	Kaushika Amin (Lab)
2026 by-election	Ajda Ovat (Lab)	John Bevan (Lab)	Kaushika Amin (Lab)

== Elections ==
=== 2026 by-election ===
The by-election took place on 25 June 2026, following the disqualification of Jayon Henriques.

2026 Northumberland Park by-election
Party	Candidate	Votes	%	±%
Labour	Ajda Ovat	877	44.3	+12.4
Green	Rose Dakuo	839	42.4	+13.1
Reform	Ian Sinclair	106	5.4	−0.6
Conservative	Kenny Ajao	98	4.9	−2.0
Liberal Democrats	David Schmitz	60	3.0	−1.7
Turnout				
Labour gain from Green		Swing		

=== 2026 election ===
The election took place on 7 May 2026.

Northumberland Park (3)
Party	Candidate	Votes	%	±%
Labour	Kaushika Amin	1,238	43.7	−29.6
Labour	John Bevan	1,237	43.7	−29.7
Green	Jayon Henriques	1,135	40.1	+27.2
Labour	Ajda Ovat	1,022	36.1	−33.4
Haringey Socialist Alliance	Alison Davy	823	29.1	N/A
Haringey Socialist Alliance	Gary McFarlane	622	22.0	N/A
Conservative	Robin Everett	270	9.5	−1.5
Conservative	Dominic Graham	241	8.5	−1.3
Reform	Dominic Simler	231	8.2	N/A
Conservative	Peter Gorski	227	8.0	+0.2
Liberal Democrats	Glen Nichol	182	6.4	−1.3
Liberal Democrats	Charlotte Schmitz	170	6.0	−0.8
Liberal Democrats	Richard Teuten	125	4.4	−2.4
Turnout		2,830	32.0	+6.2
Labour hold		Swing		
Labour hold		Swing		
Green gain from Labour		Swing		

=== 2022 election ===
The election took place on 5 May 2022, under new boundaries.

Northumberland Park (3)
Party	Candidate	Votes	%	±%
Labour	John Bevan	1,751	73.4	
Labour	Kaushika Amin	1,748	73.3	
Labour	Ajda Ovat	1,658	69.5	
Green	Marit Leenstra	307	12.9	
Conservative	Daniel Babis	264	11.0	
Conservative	Calum McGillivray	234	9.8	
Conservative	Mitty Ragnuth	187	7.8	
Liberal Democrats	Ron Aitken	184	7.7	
Liberal Democrats	Bob Lindsay-Smith	161	6.8	
Liberal Democrats	Valerie Mortimer	161	6.8	
Turnout		2,384	25.83	
Labour win (new boundaries)				
Labour win (new boundaries)				
Labour win (new boundaries)				

=== 2018 election ===
The election took place on 3 May 2018.

Northumberland Park (3)
Party	Candidate	Votes	%	±%
Labour	John Bevan	2,188	78.5	+16.9
Labour	Kaushika Amin	2,098	75.3	+13.5
Labour	Sheila Peacock	2,036	73.1	+6.7
Conservative	Baran Yazgili	173	6.2	−2.0
Green	Joanne Fry	170	6.1	−4.4
Conservative	Massimo Rossi	166	6.0	−0.8
Conservative	Eva Ostrowski	162	5.8	−0.5
Green	Emily Darko	156	5.6	−0.5
Green	Kenneth Edwards	149	5.3	−0.6
Liberal Democrats	Clive Carter	147	5.3	+0.7
Liberal Democrats	Valerie Mortimer	110	3.9	−0.7
Liberal Democrats	Brian Haley	107	3.8	+0.5
English Democrat	Janus Polenceusz	46	1.7	N/A
English Democrat	Max Spencer	41	1.5	N/A
Turnout		2,793	29.98	−2.01
Labour hold		Swing		
Labour hold		Swing		
Labour hold		Swing		

=== 2014 election ===
The election took place on 22 May 2014.

Northumberland Park (3)
Party	Candidate	Votes	%	±%
Labour	Sheila Peacock	1,930	66.4	+9.1
Labour	Kaushika Amin	1,796	61.8	+5.7
Labour	John Bevan	1,791	61.6	+1.7
TUSC	Ibrahim Avcil	439	15.1	N/A
Green	Emily Lambert	306	10.5	+5.4
TUSC	Paul Burnham	274	9.4	N/A
Conservative	Janet Harris	239	8.2	−2.5
Conservative	Eric Lattimore	199	6.8	−3.8
Conservative	Bart Warszawski	184	6.3	−4.3
Green	Martina Weitsch	177	6.1	+1.6
Green	Mridu Thanki	173	5.9	+1.9
Liberal Democrats	Leonidas Leonida	135	4.6	−9.8
Liberal Democrats	John Thompson	133	4.6	−3.0
Liberal Democrats	Valerie Mortimer	97	3.3	−7.6
Turnout		2,937	31.99	−24.2
Labour hold		Swing		
Labour hold		Swing		
Labour hold		Swing		

=== 2010 election ===
The election on 6 May 2010 took place on the same day as the United Kingdom general election.

Northumberland Park (3)
Party	Candidate	Votes	%	±%
Labour	John Bevan	2,863	59.9	−2.2
Labour	Sheila Peacock	2,735	57.3	−5.3
Labour	Kaushika Amin	2,681	56.1	−4.2
Liberal Democrats	Leo Leonida	686	14.4	+3.4
Liberal Democrats	Valerie Mortimer	522	10.9	+0.2
Conservative	Roger Bradley	509	10.7	−2.8
Conservative	Jason Obeng	507	10.6	−0.6
Conservative	Jane Manase	506	10.6	−0.4
Liberal Democrats	Bambos Paphitis	363	7.6	−2.9
Green	Ursula Berry	243	5.1	−3.9
Green	Nick Ceasar	217	4.5	N/A
Green	Andrew Taylor	189	4.0	N/A
Turnout		4,823	56.2	+26.7
Labour hold		Swing		
Labour hold		Swing		
Labour hold		Swing		

=== 2006 election ===
The election took place on 4 May 2006.

Northumberland Park (3)
Party	Candidate	Votes	%	±%
Labour	Sheila Peacock	1,445	62.6	−6.2
Labour	John Bevan	1,434	62.1	−4.4
Labour	Kaushika Amin	1,392	60.3	−5.6
Conservative	Roger Bradley	311	13.5	−0.3
Conservative	Gladys Weeks	258	11.2	+0.6
Conservative	Calistra Toussaint	255	11.0	+0.9
Liberal Democrats	Francis Coleman	254	11.0	+0.6
Liberal Democrats	Alan Aris	248	10.7	−0.3
Liberal Democrats	Valerie Mortimer	242	10.5	+0.9
Green	David Burns	208	9.0	−0.4
Independent	James McGlynn	123	5.3	+2.1
Turnout		2,335	29.5	+10.0
Labour hold		Swing		
Labour hold		Swing		
Labour hold		Swing		

=== 2002 election ===
The election took place on 2 May 2002.

Northumberland Park (3)
Party	Candidate	Votes	%	±%
Labour	Sheila Peacock	1,002	68.8	
Labour	John Bevan	968	66.5	
Labour	Ray Dodds	960	65.9	
Conservative	Roger Bradley	201	13.8	
Liberal Democrats	Alan Aris	160	11.0	
Conservative	Gladys Weeks	154	10.6	
Liberal Democrats	Francis Coleman	152	10.4	
Conservative	Joseph Ocwet	147	10.1	
Liberal Democrats	Valerie Silbiger	140	9.6	
Green	David Burns	137	9.4	
Independent	James McGlynn	47	3.2	
Turnout		1,461	19.5	
Labour win (new seat)				
Labour win (new seat)				
Labour win (new seat)				
