= Seven Sisters (Haringey ward) =

Electoral ward in London, England

- Electoral ward for the Haringey London Borough Council
- Borough: Haringey
- County: Greater London
- Population: 9,238 (2021)
- Major settlements: Seven Sisters
- Area: 0.6195 km²

Current electoral ward
- Created: 1965
- Number of members: 2 (since 2022); 3 (2002 to 2022); 2 (1978 to 2002); 3 (1964 to 1978)
- Councillors: Ash Ahmed; Luisa Brands

Seven Sisters is an electoral ward in the London Borough of Haringey. The ward was first used in the 1964 elections and elects two councillors to Haringey London Borough Council.

== Geography ==
The ward is named after the area of Seven Sisters.

== Councillors ==
Election	Councillor	Councillor	Councillor
1964	F. A. Knight (Lab)	D. Cunningham (Lab)	R. Parker (Lab)
1968	J. M. Scott (Con)	E. C. Perry (Con)	E. M. Donno (Con)
1971	F. A. Knight (Lab)	D. Cunningham (Lab)	L. H. Collis (Lab)
1974	F. A. Knight (Lab)	E. W. Day (Lab)	L. H. Collis (Lab)

Following the 1978 revision of ward boundaries, this ward elected 2 councillors until 2002.

Election	Councillor	Councillor
1978	Frederick Knight (Lab)	Leslie Collis (Lab)
1980 by-election	Frederick Knight (Lab)	Paul Loach (Lab)
1982	Frederick Knight (Lab)	Paul Loach (Lab)
1986	Frederick Knight (Lab)	Vernon King (Lab)
1990	Frederick Knight (Lab)	Cyril Robinson (Lab)
1994	Frederick Knight (Lab)	Dhiren Basu (Lab)
1998	Frederick Knight (Lab)	Dhiren Basu (Lab)

Following the 2002 revision of ward boundaries, this ward elected 3 councillors until 2022.

Election	Councillor	Councillor	Councillor
2002	Frederick Knight (Lab)	Dhiren Basu (Lab)	Richard Reynolds (Lab)
2006	Frederick Knight (Lab)	Dhiren Basu (Lab)	Claire Kober (Lab)
2009 by-election	Joe Goldberg (Lab)	Dhiren Basu (Lab)	Claire Kober (Lab)
2010	Joe Goldberg (Lab)	Dhiren Basu (Lab)	Claire Kober (Lab)
2014	Joe Goldberg (Lab)	Dhiren Basu (Lab)	Claire Kober (Lab)
2018	Barbara Blake (Lab)	Dhiren Basu (Lab)	Erdal Dogan (Lab)

Following the 2022 revision of ward boundaries, this ward has elected 2 councillors.

Election	Councillor	Councillor
2022	Barbara Blake (Lab)	Michelle Simmons-Safo (Lab)
2026	Ash Ahmed (Grn)	Luisa Brands (Grn)

== Elections ==
=== 2026 ===
Seven Sisters (2)
Party	Candidate	Votes	%	±%
Green	Ash Ahmed	1,208	50.1	+29.1
Green	Luisa Brands	1,076	44.6	N/A
Labour	Barbara Blake*	917	38.0	−34.9
Labour	Michelle Simmons-Safo*	783	32.5	−31.3
Reform	Miguel Koseleff	135	5.6	N/A
Conservative	Tatiana Piadlowska	128	5.3	−5.3
Conservative	Shloime Royde	124	5.1	−3.6
Reform	Raul Mancera	121	5.0	N/A
Liberal Democrats	Joan Lindeman	86	3.6	−3.5
Liberal Democrats	Jhonny Rodriguez	65	2.7	−1.3
Turnout		2,410	40.1	+11.8
Green gain from Labour				
Green gain from Labour				

=== 2022 ===
Seven Sisters (2)
Party	Candidate	Votes	%	±%
Labour	Barbara Blake*	1,272	72.9	
Labour	Michelle Simmons-Safo	1,113	63.8	
Green	Rosie Pearce	367	21.0	
Conservative	Rachel George	185	10.6	
Conservative	Stephen Noble	152	8.7	
Liberal Democrats	Lydia Hirst	123	7.1	
Liberal Democrats	Jim Jenks	69	4.0	
Turnout		1,744	28.33	
Labour win (new boundaries)				
Labour win (new boundaries)				
