= West Green (ward) =

Electoral ward in London, England

- Electoral ward for the Haringey London Borough Council
- Borough: Haringey
- County: Greater London
- Population: 14,968 (2021)
- Major settlements: West Green, London
- Area: 1.507 km²

Current electoral ward
- Created: 1965
- Number of members: 3
- Councillors: Anne Gray; Seema Chandwani; Sarah Williams

West Green is an electoral ward in the London Borough of Haringey. The ward was first used in the 1964 elections and elects three councillors to Haringey London Borough Council.

== Geography ==
The ward is named for the suburb of West Green.

== Councillors ==
| Election | Councillor | Councillor | Councillor |
|---|---|---|---|
| 1964 | D. Clark (Lab) | D. J. Ding (Lab) | L. H. Lipson (Lab) |
| 1968 | H. E. Spratt (Con) | W. C. Donno (Con) | P. A. Spratt (Con) |
| 1971 | G. Atkinson (Lab) | G. Pollard (Lab) | A. Krokou (Lab) |
| 1974 | G. Atkinson (Lab) | D. Clark (Lab) | S. J. Whittle (Lab) |
| 1978 | Glenys Atkinson (Lab) | Douglas Clark (Lab) | Stephen Whittle (Lab) |
| 1982 | Walter Taylor (Con) | Philip Mandeville (Con) | Mary Salim (Con) |
| 1986 | Ronald Bell (Con) | Peter Chalk (Lab) | Mary Salim (Con) |
| 1990 | Eddie Griffith (Lab) | Erline Prescott (Lab) | Alpha Turay (Lab) |
| 1994 | Peter Jones (Lab) | Erline Prescott (Lab) | Rahman Khan (Lab) |
| 1998 | Peter Jones (Lab) | Rafaat Mughal (Lab) | Rahman Khan (Lab) |
| 2002 | Eddie Griffith (Lab) | Erline Prescott (Lab) | Rahman Khan (Lab) |
| 2006 | Eddie Griffith (Lab) | Antonia Mallett (Lab) | Rahman Khan (Lab) |
| 2010 | Eddie Griffith (Lab) | Antonia Mallett (Lab) | Rahman Khan (Lab) |
| 2014 | Eddie Griffith (Lab) | Antonia Mallett (Lab) | Eugene Akwasi-Ayisi (Lab) |
| 2018 | Mahir Demir (Lab) | Sarah Williams (Lab) | Ishmael Osamor (Lab) |
| 2018 by-election | Mahir Demir (Lab) | Sarah Williams (Lab) | Seema Chandwani (Lab) |
| 2022 | Nicola Bartlett (Lab) | Sarah Williams (Lab) | Seema Chandwani (Lab) |
| 2026 | Anne Gray (Grn) | Sarah Williams (Lab) | Seema Chandwani (Lab) |

== Elections ==
=== 2026 ===
West Green (3)
| Party | Candidate | Votes | % | ±% |
|---|---|---|---|---|
| Green | Anne Gray | 2,009 | 51.1 | N/A |
| Labour | Seema Chandwani* | 1,727 | 44.0 | −30.4 |
| Labour | Sarah Williams* | 1,504 | 38.3 | −35.7 |
| Labour | Sami Ngoie | 1,343 | 34.2 | −39.7 |
| Haringey Socialist Alliance | Meryem Ulger | 880 | 22.4 | N/A |
| Haringey Socialist Alliance | John Sinha | 781 | 19.9 | N/A |
| Liberal Democrats | Birgit Duncan | 418 | 10.6 | −3.0 |
| Liberal Democrats | Jim Jenks | 326 | 8.3 | −2.6 |
| Liberal Democrats | Michael Woods | 289 | 7.4 | −1.3 |
| Conservative | Damian Grigorov | 281 | 7.2 | −3.2 |
| Conservative | Ewa Ostrowski | 243 | 6.2 | −4.0 |
| Conservative | Caesar Lalobo | 225 | 5.7 | −2.7 |
| Reform | Azbi Dauti | 211 | 5.4 | N/A |
| Reform | Andrew Price | 205 | 5.2 | N/A |
| Turnout | | 3,929 | 39.4 | +17.9 |
| Green gain from Labour | | Swing | | |
| Labour hold | | Swing | | |
| Labour hold | | Swing | | |

=== 2022 ===
West Green (3)
| Party | Candidate | Votes | % | ±% |
|---|---|---|---|---|
| Labour | Seema Chandwani* | 2,213 | 74.4 | |
| Labour | Sarah Williams* | 2,201 | 74.0 | |
| Labour | Nicola Bartlett | 2,198 | 73.9 | |
| Liberal Democrats | Kathy Riddle | 404 | 13.6 | |
| Liberal Democrats | Gregory Hirst | 325 | 10.9 | |
| Conservative | Sharon Cronin | 310 | 10.4 | |
| Conservative | Fatma Cin | 303 | 10.2 | |
| Liberal Democrats | Richard Siemicki | 258 | 8.7 | |
| Conservative | Caesar Lalobo | 250 | 8.4 | |
| Turnout | | 2,974 | 21.48 | |
| Labour win (new boundaries) | | | | |
| Labour win (new boundaries) | | | | |
| Labour win (new boundaries) | | | | |
