= Joseph Howard (British politician) =

British politician

Howard in 1895.

Joseph Howard (9 May 1834 – 2 March 1923) was an English barrister and Conservative politician who sat in the House of Commons from 1885 to 1906.

Howard was born in Tottenham, the son of John Eliot Howard and Mary Crewdson and was a grandson of Luke Howard. His father was a chemist noted for pioneering work with quinine and a Quaker. Howard was educated at London University and was called to the bar at Lincoln's Inn. He was a J.P. for Middlesex and a Deputy Lieutenant for the City of London. He was in business in the iron trade. Howard was a generous helper of the poor and was well respected. He was governor of a Grammar School for 30 years and governor of a hospital

Howard was elected Member of Parliament (MP) for Tottenham when it was created as a constituency in 1885, running as a Conservative.

General election 1900 Tottenham Electorate 19,412
Party	Candidate	Votes	%	±%
Conservative	Joseph Howard	6,721	62.6	
Liberal	George Hay Morgan	4,009	37.4	
Majority		2,712	25.2	
Turnout				
Conservative hold		Swing		

He held the seat for five elections until 1906 when he resigned. He died at the age of 88.

Howard was a Quaker until his marriage to Ellen Waterhouse, daughter of Henry Waterhouse of Didsbury in 1859. They had seven children.

Parliament of the United Kingdom
New constituency	Member of Parliament for Tottenham; 1885 – 1906	Succeeded by Percy Alden
