= Alan Grahame Brown =

British politician (1913–1972)

Alan Grahame Brown (23 October 1913 – 5 January 1972) was a British pharmaceutical chemist and politician. During a single term in Parliament, he abandoned the Labour Party and joined the Conservative Party due to policy differences.

== Early life ==
Brown was born in Wood Green in north London, although his family was from Bedford and moved back there quickly. He attended Bedford School, and then decided to go into the field of pharmaceuticals by training at the College of the Pharmaceutical Society.

== Army career ==
In 1932 Brown joined the 5th Battalion of the Bedfordshire and Hertfordshire Regiment, where he served for five years. At the end of his term he married a Bedford girl (they had two sons), and he also joined the Labour Party. However, his professional career as a pharmaceutical chemist had not had long to get going before he rejoined the Army in the Second World War. He served in the 4th Battalion of his old regiment for four years, and this time was commissioned as an officer, reaching the rank of Lieutenant.

== Tottenham chemist ==
Brown then returned to set up a chemists' shop in Tottenham and became active in local politics both through the Labour Party and Co-operative Party (he was chairman of the South Tottenham Co-operative Party from 1957 to 1960). In 1956 he was elected to Middlesex County Council, where he specialised in child welfare and juvenile delinquency.

== Parliamentary candidate ==
Sir Fred Messer, the Labour Member of Parliament for Tottenham, announced in October 1958 that he would not seek re-election. Unlike Messer, the Constituency Labour Party was on the right wing of the Labour Party and this was the wing Brown found himself on as well; with his local connections, Brown was selected. At his selection he pledged to use his influence within the Parliamentary Labour Party to further policies in accordance with those of the Constituency Labour Party. He comfortably retained the seat in the 1959 general election.

== Imprisonment of juveniles ==
Brown launched a high-profile campaign very soon after his election, when he discovered that a 14-year-old girl who had truanted from school was being held on remand in HM Prison Holloway together with murderers. Brown successfully sought leave to introduce a Bill which would stop magistrates from sending children under 16 to prison, but the Bill was 'talked out' when debated.

== Crossing the floor ==
Meanwhile, the left-wing campaign in the Labour Party which had changed party policy to unilateral nuclear disarmament caused Brown some discomfort. In March 1961, Brown wrote to Hugh Gaitskell declaring that he would not "retreat one inch from what I believe is the correct and honourable position", and announcing his resignation from the Labour Party to sit as an independent. Tottenham Constituency Labour Party gave him support, in line with their own views on party policy, by 36 votes to 1.

On being interviewed, Brown declared that defence policy was not the only area that he disagreed with Labour Party policy, and that his views on that issue were now closer to the Conservative government. During his period as an independent member, his voting pattern in the House of Commons was similar to that of Conservative MPs. The Tottenham Constituency Labour Party proceeded to select a new candidate early in 1962, indicating that they did not expect Brown to rejoin. Early in May 1962, Brown was granted the Conservative whip.

== Private members' bill ==
In November 1962 Brown was lucky in the ballot for Private Members' Bills and introduced the Nursing Homes Bill which allowed the government to register and regulate private nursing homes. This Bill was ultimately successful. In December 1962, Brown was rescued from a caravan in which he was sleeping near Parliament in which an oil heater had begun to leak and nearly caught fire; he explained that he used the caravan for child welfare work and occasionally slept there after late sittings.

Despite having been adopted as Conservative candidate for Tottenham, Brown was upset by the Douglas-Home government's abolition of resale price maintenance which he knew that many pharmaceutical chemists relied on to set prices. He set down a large stack of amendments to the Bill, but saw them rejected. At the 1964 general election, Brown lost his seat back to Labour.

== Later life and death ==
In April 1966, Brown rejoined the Labour Party. In January 1972, his body was found by his 10-year-old daughter in a Bournemouth hotel room, and he was found to have died by suicide.

Parliament of the United Kingdom
Preceded by Sir Frederick Messer	Member of Parliament for Tottenham; 1959–1964	Succeeded by Norman Atkinson
