= 2000 Tottenham by-election =

2000 UK Parliamentary by-election

- 22 June 2000

The Tottenham seat in the House of Commons Triggered by death of incumbent
- Turnout: 34.4% (▼19.2%)
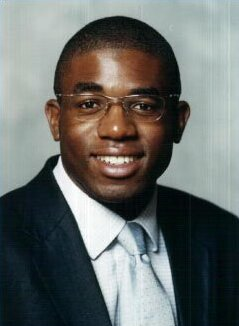

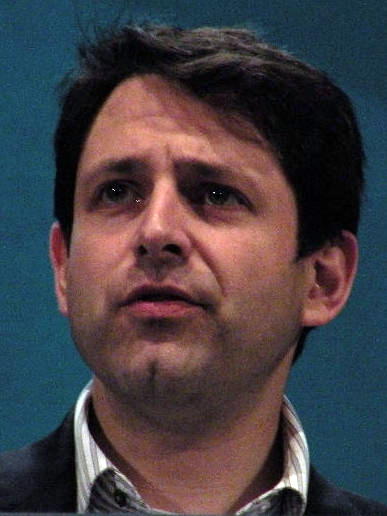

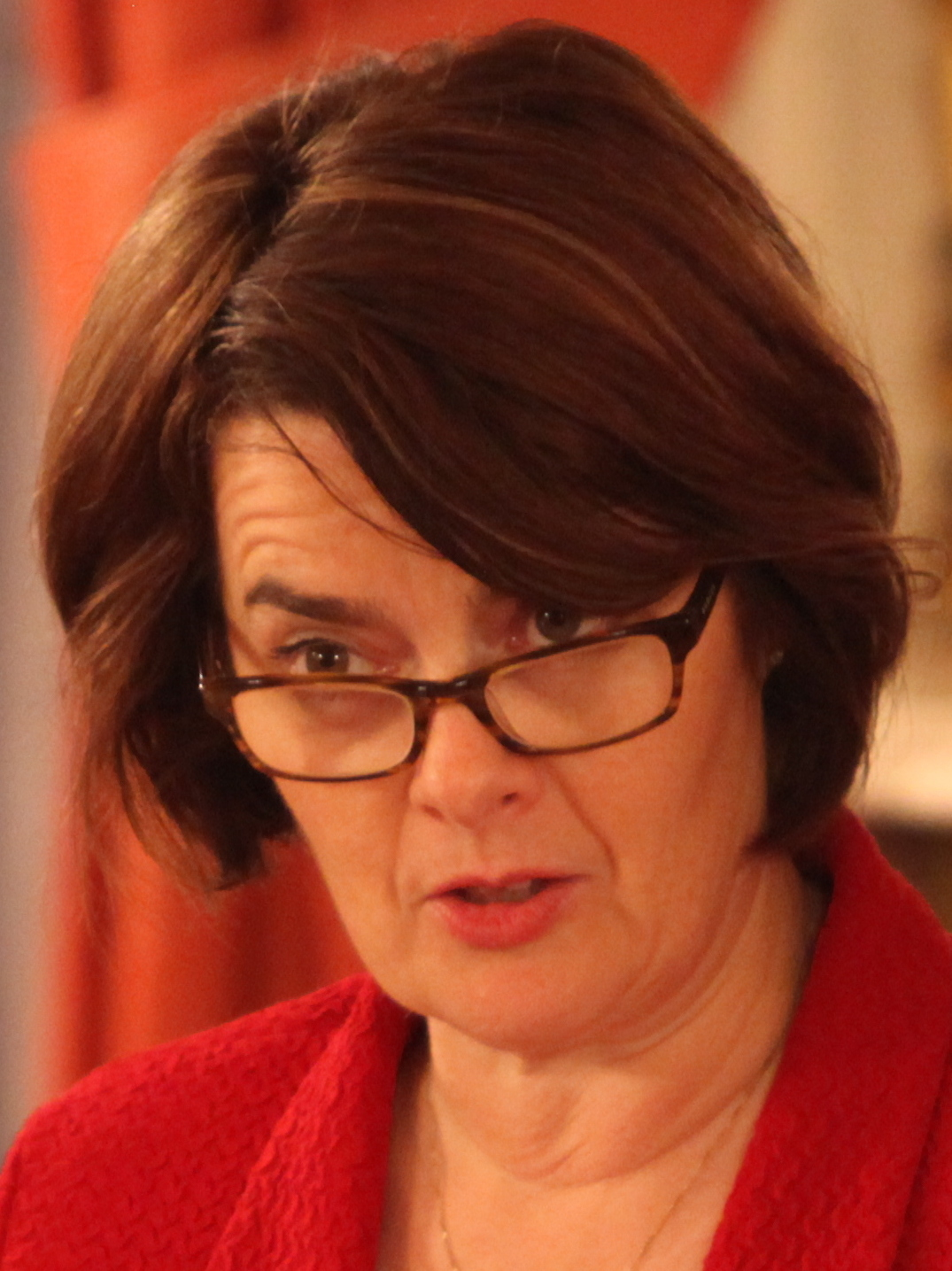
	First party	Second party
Candidate	David Lammy	Duncan Hames
Party	Labour	Liberal Democrats
Popular vote	8,785	3,139
Percentage	53.5%	19.1%
Swing	▼15.8%	▲7.3%
	Third party	Fourth party
		SA
Candidate	Jane Ellison	Weyman Bennett
Party	Conservative	Socialist Alliance
Popular vote	2,634	885
Percentage	16.0%	5.4%
Swing	▲0.3%	New
MP before election
Bernie Grant
Labour
Subsequent MP
David Lammy
Labour

A by-election for the United Kingdom parliamentary constituency of Tottenham was held on 22 June 2000, following the death of incumbent Labour Party Member of Parliament (MP) Bernie Grant. It was won by Labour candidate David Lammy, who comfortably retained the seat for the party.

Lammy would go on to become a prominent Labour figure, holding several senior ministerial positions including Deputy Prime Minister.

== Background and campaign ==
Bernie Grant, who had served as MP for Tottenham since 1987, died on 8 April 2000, triggering a by-election in his consittuency. Grant was one of the first four black MPs and the constituency was one of the centres of the London Afro-Caribbean community. However, Grant's widow Sharon (who was white) declared her intention to seek selection and this split opinion within the local Labour Party. Both Sharon and Bernie Grant had been on the left wing of the party whereas the leading black contender for the nomination, David Lammy, was a supporter of centrist Prime Minister Tony Blair. Following a close-fought selection battle, Lammy was chosen. During the campaign, Sharon Grant made a public show of supporting his election campaign in order not to allow disunity in the Labour Party.

Polling day in the by-election was on 22 June, when Lammy comfortably retained the seat for Labour on a low turnout. Neither of the other main party candidates was able to mount a credible challenge in a seat where Labour was so strongly ahead, with Liberal Democrat candidate and future Chippenham MP Duncan Hames finishing second, and Conservative candidate and future Battersea MP Jane Ellison coming third. All three candidates from the Labour, Conservative and Liberal Democrat parties in this by-election would go on to become MPs.

== Result ==
2000 Tottenham by-election
Party	Candidate	Votes	%	±%
Labour	David Lammy	8,785	53.5	–15.8
Liberal Democrats	Duncan Hames	3,139	19.1	+7.3
Conservative	Jane Ellison	2,634	16.0	+0.3
Socialist Alliance	Weyman Bennett	885	5.4	New
Green	Peter Budge	606	3.7	+0.9
Reform 2000	Erol Basarik	177	1.1	New
UKIP	Ashwin Tanna	136	0.8	New
Independent	Dorian L.D. de Braâm	55	0.3	New
Majority		5,646	34.4	–19.2
Turnout		16,417	25.4	–31.5
Registered electors		64,554		
Labour hold		Swing	–12.0	

== General Election result, 1997 ==
General election 1997: Tottenham
Party	Candidate	Votes	%	±%
Labour	Bernie Grant	26,121	69.3	+12.8
Conservative	Andrew R. Scantlebury	5,921	15.7	–14.1
Liberal Democrats	Neil Hughes	4,064	10.8	–0.6
Green	Peter Budge	1,059	2.8	+0.8
ProLife Alliance	Leelan L.E. Tay	210	0.5	New
Workers Revolutionary	Christopher F. Anglin	181	0.5	New
Socialist Equality	Tania Kent	148	0.4	New
Majority		20,200	53.6	+26.9
Turnout		37,704	56.9	–8.7
Registered electors		66,251		
Labour hold		Swing	+13.4	
