= Northumberland Park, London =

Coordinates: 51.602°N 0.058°W

Northumberland Park
- Location within Greater London
- Population: 14,429 (2011 Census.Ward)
- London borough: Haringey
- Ceremonial county: Greater London
- Region: London
- Country: England
- Sovereign state: United Kingdom
- Post town: LONDON
- Postcode district: N17
- Dialling code: 020
- Police: Metropolitan
- Fire: London
- Ambulance: London
- UK Parliament: Tottenham
- London Assembly: Enfield and Haringey

Northumberland Park is a suburban area in the Tottenham area of London Borough of Haringey, in Greater London, England. It is largely residential, consisting of houses and flats. It is the location of Tottenham Hotspur Stadium, the home ground of Tottenham Hotspur F.C. The ward is represented by three Labour councillors. It is named after the Northumberland family who originally owned the land, the family included Henry Percy (nicknamed Harry Hotspur), who Tottenham Hotspur Football Club are named after.

== Description ==
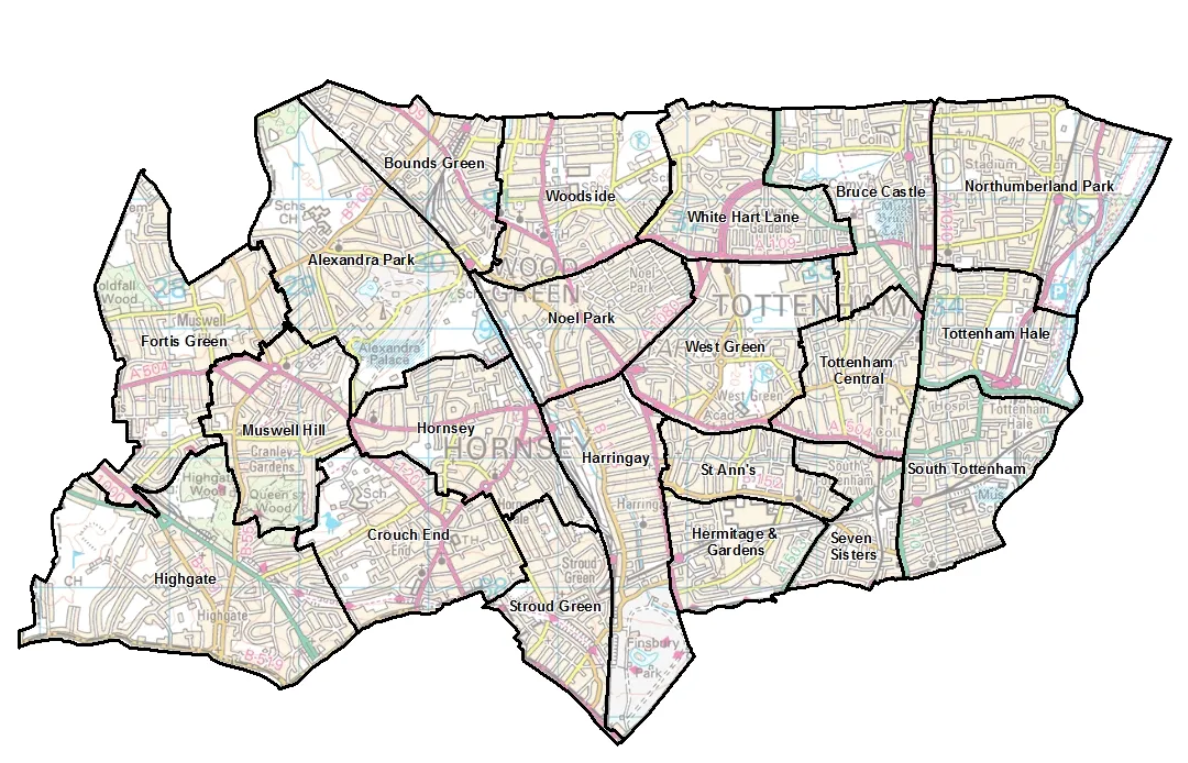
Wards of Haringey, Northumberland Park is located at the northeast corner of Haringey

Northumberland Park, the ward, and Northumberland Park the estate are at the north-east of Tottenham, and at the north-east of Haringey. Within Haringey, it borders Bruce Grove to the west and Tottenham Hale to the south. It also borders Edmonton in Enfield to its north and Lea Valley to the east.

It includes a number of major housing estates – Northumberland Park estate, Stellar House, Altair Close and The Lindales.

== Demographics ==
As of 2018, the ward has a population of 16,641, a high proportion of which are from ethnic backgrounds. Those of Black ethnicity form the largest ethnic grouping in the ward, representing 40.3% of the population, while those classified as White British form 16.6% of the population, proportionally the highest and lowest in Haringey respectively. 50.8% of the population identify themselves as Christian and 24.2% Muslim, the largest proportion of Muslims of all wards in Haringey. 13.2% profess no religion.

The ward is the most deprived in Haringey, and one of the most deprived in London. Nationally, it was ranked among the 2–3% most deprived of all wards in 2015. The median household income in Northumberland Park is the lowest in Haringey, substantially below the average of London. It also has a substantially higher level of unemployment (16.3% in 2018) than the averages of Haringey and London.

== Redevelopment plans ==
The Northumberland Development Project is a major project that centers on the construction of the Tottenham Hotspur Stadium but also include hotels, residential units, and retail spaces. It is intended to be the catalyst for a 20-year regeneration program for Tottenham planned by the Haringey Council. Among the projects planned is the High Road West regeneration scheme which aims to redevelop the area between the stadium and White Hart Lane station. The White Hart Lane Station will be rebuilt, while the Northumberland Park railway station is being reconstructed with significant improvements for services planned.

The area has been included in the Tottenham Area Action Plan a controversial program to improve the standard of housing and employment, while maximising the use of the land asset. This acts as a politically approved framework for development by the Haringey Development Vehicle a joint venture company 50/50 owned by London Borough of Haringey and Lendlease. The setting up of this organisation, approved by the Haringey Cabinet was opposed by 20 of the Labour councillors in the 49 member council.

== Transport ==
There are various transportation links including White Hart Lane railway station and Northumberland Park railway station and Northumberland Park bus stand, which is served by routes W3, 476 and 341.

It is also the location of the London Underground's Victoria line depot.

== Commerce ==
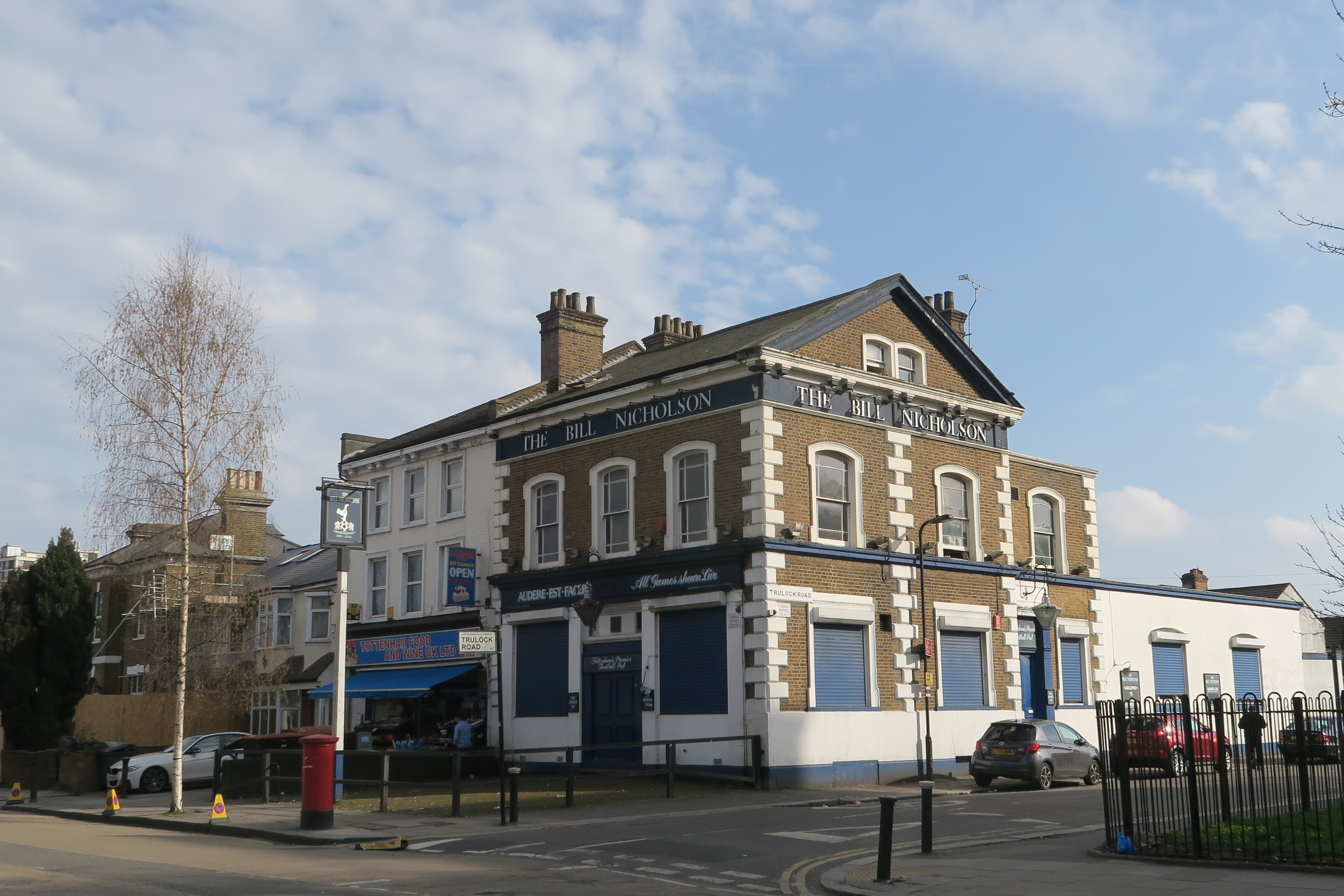
The Bill Nicholson pub

There are also a number of shops located at the end nearest to Tottenham High Road. There is one pub currently open along Northumberland Park road, 'The Bill Nicholson', formerly known as 'The Northumberland Arms', colloquially known as "The Billy Nick" after the Tottenham Hotspur manager Bill Nicholson and is frequented by Spurs fans on match days.

== Politics ==
Northumberland Park is part of the Tottenham constituency for elections to the House of Commons of the United Kingdom.

Northumberland Park is part of the Northumberland Park ward for elections to Haringey London Borough Council.
