= Norman Atkinson =

British politician

Norman Atkinson (25 March 1923 – 8 July 2013) was a British politician who served as Labour Member of Parliament for the London constituency of Tottenham from 1964 until 1987.

== Early life ==
Manchester-born, Atkinson was educated at technical school and became a design engineer at Manchester University.

== Political career ==
Atkinson was a councillor on Manchester City Council 1945–49. He contested Manchester Wythenshawe in 1955 and Altrincham and Sale in 1959, before being elected for Tottenham in the 1964 general election.

A member of Labour's National Executive Committee for five years, Atkinson also served as the party's national treasurer from 1976 to 1981. As treasurer, he clashed with Chancellor Denis Healey at the 1976 Labour Party Conference. He was a founding member of the Socialist Campaign Group.

He did not contest the 1987 general election, having been deselected by his constituency party (subsequent to boundary changes in 1983 which added roughly half of the old Wood Green constituency) in favour of Bernie Grant.

== Later life ==
After he ceased being an MP, Atkinson authored a book on Sir Joseph Whitworth (The World’s Best Mechanician, 1996) and a play (Old Merrypebbles).

== Sources ==
- N. Atkinson – Spartacus Educational
- BBC News

== Notes ==
Parliament of the United Kingdom
Preceded by Alan Brown	Member of Parliament for Tottenham; 1964–1987	Succeeded by Bernie Grant
Political offices
Preceded by James Callaghan	Treasurer of the Labour Party; 1976–1981	Succeeded by Eric Varley
