= 2006 Haringey London Borough Council election =

2006 local election in England

2006 Haringey Council election
← 2002	4 May 2006	2010 →

All 57 seats to Haringey London Borough Council 29 seats needed for a majority
	First party	Second party
Party	Labour	Liberal Democrats
Seats won	30	27
Seat change	▼12	▲12
Popular vote	20,235	20,347
Percentage	35.0%	35.2%
Swing	▼5.5%	▲9.1%
- Map of the results of the 2006 Haringey council election. Labour in red and Liberal Democrats in yellow.
Council control before election
Labour
Council control after election
Labour

Elections to Haringey Council were held on 4 May 2006. The whole council was up for election for the first time since the 2002 election.

Haringey local elections are held every four years, with the next in 2010.

== Election result ==
Haringey local election result 2006
Party	Seats	Gains	Losses	Net gain/loss	Seats %	Votes %	Votes	+/−
Labour	30	0	12	▼12	52.6	35.0	20,235	▼5.5
Liberal Democrats	27	12	0	▲12	47.4	35.2	20,347	▲9.1
Conservative	0	0	0	Steady	0.0	13.5	7,836	▼2.4
Green	0	0	0	Steady	0.0	13.1	7,553	▲0.2
Respect	0	0	0	Steady	0.0	2.1	1,205	New
Independent	0	0	0	Steady	0.0	1.2	675	▲0.5

== Results by Ward ==
=== Alexandra ===
Alexandra (3)
Party	Candidate	Votes	%	±%
Liberal Democrats	Susan Oatway*	1,966	56.7	+5.2
Liberal Democrats	Wayne Hoban*	1,937	55.8	+7.7
Liberal Democrats	David Beacham*	1,914	55.2	+4.2
Labour	Joanna Christophides	720	20.7	−9.1
Labour	Stewart McIlroy	680	19.6	−6.2
Labour	Stuart McNamara	661	19.0	−7.1
Green	David Rennie	521	15.0	+4.0
Green	Helen Lipscomb	500	14.4	+3.9
Green	Michael Shaughnessy	404	11.6	N/A
Conservative	Rachael Shawcross	310	8.9	−2.5
Conservative	Peter Uffindell	286	8.2	−3.2
Conservative	Mohammed Ismail	270	7.8	−3.0
Turnout		3,479	43.6	+0.1
Liberal Democrats hold		Swing		
Liberal Democrats hold		Swing		
Liberal Democrats hold		Swing		

=== Bounds Green ===
Bounds Green (3)
Party	Candidate	Votes	%	±%
Labour	Matthew Cooke	1,213	39.3	−6.5
Liberal Democrats	Ali Demirci	1,212	39.3	+18.0
Liberal Democrats	John Oakes	1,167	37.8	+18.5
Labour	Tom Davidson*	1,164	37.7	−12.5
Liberal Democrats	Yasmin Rizvi	1,156	37.4	+19.0
Labour	Vivienne Manheim*	1,097	35.5	−15.0
Green	Kathryn Dean	360	11.7	−4.9
Green	Andrea Phillips	303	9.8	N/A
Conservative	Richard Holden	277	9.0	−10.4
Conservative	Diane Bannister	276	8.9	−9.0
Green	Rita Gayford	275	8.9	N/A
Conservative	Natalie Evans	273	8.8	−7.7
Turnout		3,105	39.7	+12.9
Labour hold		Swing		
Liberal Democrats gain from Labour		Swing		
Liberal Democrats gain from Labour		Swing		

=== Bruce Grove ===
Bruce Grove (3)
Party	Candidate	Votes	%	±%
Labour	Ray Dodds**	1,334	56.0	−14.4
Labour	Dilek Dogus	1,299	54.6	−8.7
Labour	Emma Jones	1,245	52.3	−10.6
Liberal Democrats	Julia Glenn	338	14.2	+5.4
Green	Tarik Dervish	312	13.1	−1.7
Green	Dennis Bury	311	13.1	N/A
Liberal Democrats	Lynn Hopkins	304	12.8	+4.0
Conservative	Matthew Brown	292	12.3	+0.7
Green	Argyros Arghyrou	289	12.1	N/A
Conservative	Margaret Bradley	289	12.1	+1.0
Liberal Democrats	David Oxford	259	10.9	+4.1
Conservative	Andrew James	244	10.2	+0.8
Turnout		2,394	29.7	+6.5
Labour hold		Swing		
Labour hold		Swing		
Labour hold		Swing		

Ray Dodds was a sitting councillor for Northumberland Park ward.

=== Crouch End ===
Crouch End (3)
Party	Candidate	Votes	%	±%
Liberal Democrats	Linda Weber	1,870	55.9	+7.3
Liberal Democrats	Ron Aitken*	1,820	54.4	+5.6
Liberal Democrats	David Winskill*	1,771	52.9	+4.1
Labour	Phillip Browne	603	18.0	−9.2
Labour	Ali Nabeii	547	16.3	−9.9
Green	Jayne Forbes	517	15.5	−1.5
Labour	Abdul Koroma	503	15.0	−11.5
Green	Martin Ashby	502	15.0	+2.4
Conservative	Nicola Bates	451	13.5	+1.5
Conservative	Nicholas O'Brien	433	12.9	+1.9
Conservative	Julian Sherwood	423	12.6	+2.1
Green	James Smith	397	11.9	N/A
Turnout		3,350	38.2	+6.1
Liberal Democrats hold		Swing		
Liberal Democrats hold		Swing		
Liberal Democrats hold		Swing		

=== Fortis Green ===
Fortis Green (3)
Party	Candidate	Votes	%	±%
Liberal Democrats	Sara Benyon	1,855	56.0	+15.6
Liberal Democrats	Matthew Davies*	1,719	51.9	+11.9
Liberal Democrats	Martin Newton*	1,700	51.3	+12.0
Conservative	Patrick Cusworth	628	18.9	−11.5
Conservative	David Douglas	620	18.7	−10.9
Conservative	Gabriel Rozenberg	577	17.4	−11.9
Labour	Alexander Hughes	502	15.1	−6.5
Labour	Iquo Amaegbe	489	14.8	−5.2
Labour	Dhirendra Halder	476	14.4	−5.6
Green	Mark Caulfield	426	12.9	+1.5
Green	Daniel Rosenberg	391	11.8	+4.3
Green	Nadja von Massow	328	9.9	N/A
Turnout		3,323	38.8	−0.7
Liberal Democrats hold		Swing		
Liberal Democrats hold		Swing		
Liberal Democrats hold		Swing		

=== Harringay ===
Harringay (3)
Party	Candidate	Votes	%	±%
Liberal Democrats	Karen Alexander	1,308	44.1	+25.4
Labour	Gina Adamou*	1,254	42.3	−7.2
Liberal Democrats	Carolyn Baker	1,159	39.1	+26.1
Liberal Democrats	David Schmitz	1,075	36.2	+24.7
Labour	Alpha Kane	1,068	36.0	−6.4
Labour	Takki Sulaiman*	1,024	34.5	−6.7
Green	Matthew Pollitt	345	11.6	−8.6
Green	Peter Polycarpou	343	11.6	−5.9
Green	Peter McAskie	339	11.4	−3.7
Conservative	Kshitis Das	187	6.3	−12.1
Conservative	Peter Gilbert	163	5.5	−14.1
Conservative	Sally Lumb	152	5.1	−9.8
Turnout		2,979	36.6	+10.7
Liberal Democrats gain from Labour		Swing		
Labour hold		Swing		
Liberal Democrats gain from Labour		Swing		

=== Highgate ===
Highgate (3)
Party	Candidate	Votes	%	±%
Liberal Democrats	Walter Hare*	1,534	42.8	+1.0
Liberal Democrats	Justin Portess	1,523	42.5	−0.9
Liberal Democrats	Neil Williams*	1,405	39.2	−0.8
Conservative	Peter Forrest	1,163	32.4	−1.5
Conservative	David Allen	1,119	31.2	−0.3
Conservative	Douglas McNeill	1,068	29.8	−0.2
Independent	Ralph Crisp	467	13.0	N/A
Green	Richard Edwards	424	11.8	−1.9
Labour	David Heath	418	11.7	−9.6
Labour	Barbara Simon	412	11.5	−8.6
Green	Charles Keep	349	9.7	N/A
Labour	Peter Jones	347	9.7	−8.9
Green	Noel Lynch	262	7.3	N/A
Turnout		3,595	45.0	+9.6
Liberal Democrats hold		Swing		
Liberal Democrats hold		Swing		
Liberal Democrats hold		Swing		

=== Hornsey ===
Hornsey (3)
Party	Candidate	Votes	%	±%
Liberal Democrats	Errol Reid	1,530	48.4	+24.1
Liberal Democrats	Monica Whyte	1,432	45.3	+21.7
Liberal Democrats	Robert Gorrie	1,388	43.9	+27.0
Labour	Quincy Prescott*	1,028	32.5	−12.1
Labour	Richard Milner*	1,020	32.3	−11.6
Labour	Erline Prescott**	948	30.0	−17.6
Green	Paul Butler	454	14.4	−2.7
Green	Mary Hogan	429	13.6	−3.2
Green	Sarah Phillips	356	11.3	N/A
Conservative	Elizabeth Henderson	191	6.0	−7.2
Conservative	Jennifer Grant	176	5.6	−5.9
Conservative	Kay Curtis	169	5.3	−5.7
Turnout		3,173	39.9	+12.6
Liberal Democrats gain from Labour		Swing		
Liberal Democrats gain from Labour		Swing		
Liberal Democrats gain from Labour		Swing		

Erline Prescott was a sitting councillor in West Green ward.

=== Muswell Hill ===
Muswell Hill (3)
Party	Candidate	Votes	%	±%
Liberal Democrats	Jonathan Bloch*	2,060	59.6	−2.3
Liberal Democrats	Gail Engert*	2,037	58.9	−3.1
Liberal Democrats	Sheila Rainger	1,916	55.4	−4.5
Labour	David Thacker	707	20.5	+1.1
Labour	Rebecca Wilkinson	656	19.0	−0.1
Labour	Peter Chalk	648	18.8	−0.1
Green	Jeremy Green	482	13.9	+4.0
Green	Francesca Richards	375	10.9	+2.0
Conservative	Roderick Allen	352	10.2	+1.6
Green	Andrew Martin	302	8.7	N/A
Conservative	Anne Forrest	297	8.6	−0.3
Conservative	Evan Price	280	8.1	−0.3
Turnout		3,463	43.5	+4.4
Liberal Democrats hold		Swing		
Liberal Democrats hold		Swing		
Liberal Democrats hold		Swing		

=== Noel Park ===
Noel Park (3)
Party	Candidate	Votes	%	±%
Labour	Alan Dobbie*	1,124	42.4	−10.9
Liberal Democrats	Catherine Harris	1,114	42.0	+23.4
Liberal Democrats	Fiyaz Mughal	1,031	38.9	+23.0
Labour	Katherine Wynne**	1,024	38.6	−14.3
Labour	Neville Watson	1,007	38.0	−12.7
Liberal Democrats	Balan Sisupalan	920	34.7	+22.6
Green	Annabel Pilott	257	9.7	−4.7
Conservative	Susan Dennis	249	9.4	−7.3
Conservative	Neil O'Shea	240	9.0	−5.7
Conservative	David Grant	229	8.6	−5.2
Green	Howard Pilott	183	6.9	N/A
Turnout		2,664	32.6	+9.5
Labour hold		Swing		
Liberal Democrats gain from Labour		Swing		
Liberal Democrats gain from Labour		Swing		

Katherine Wynne was a sitting councillor for Stroud Green ward

=== Northumberland Park ===
Northumberland Park (3)
Party	Candidate	Votes	%	±%
Labour	Sheila Peacock*	1,445	62.6	−6.2
Labour	John Bevan*	1,434	62.1	−4.4
Labour	Kaushika Amin	1,392	60.3	−5.6
Conservative	Roger Bradley	311	13.5	−0.3
Conservative	Gladys Weeks	258	11.2	+0.6
Conservative	Calistra Toussaint	255	11.0	+0.9
Liberal Democrats	Francis Coleman	254	11.0	+0.6
Liberal Democrats	Alan Aris	248	10.7	−0.3
Liberal Democrats	Valerie Mortimer	242	10.5	+0.9
Green	David Burns	208	9.0	−0.4
Independent	James McGlynn	123	5.3	+2.1
Turnout		2,335	29.5	+10.0
Labour hold		Swing		
Labour hold		Swing		
Labour hold		Swing		

=== Seven Sisters ===
Seven Sisters (3)
Party	Candidate	Votes	%	±%
Labour	Dhirendra Basu*	1,216	46.5	−14.4
Labour	Fred Knight*	1,195	45.7	−12.7
Labour	Claire Kober	1,124	43.0	−14.9
Conservative	Zev Gruber	728	27.9	+12.6
Conservative	Cecil Pinnock	682	26.1	+11.8
Conservative	Lydia Rivlin	647	24.8	+9.9
Green	Ursula Bury	342	13.1	+0.3
Liberal Democrats	Kathleen Osborne	334	12.8	+1.2
Liberal Democrats	Timothy Harris	307	11.7	+2.7
Green	Jenepher Gordon	305	11.7	N/A
Liberal Democrats	Glen Nichol	269	10.3	+3.9
Turnout		2,635	30.9	+9.2
Labour hold		Swing		
Labour hold		Swing		
Labour hold		Swing		

=== St Ann's ===
St Ann's (3)
Party	Candidate	Votes	%	±%
Labour	Brian Haley*	1,195	46.5	−6.7
Labour	Nilgun Canver*	1,184	46.1	−8.7
Labour	Robert Harriss*	1,064	41.4	−10.1
Respect	Simon Hester	579	22.5	+4.9
Green	Adam Boardman	500	19.5	−0.5
Respect	Tekin Kartal	468	18.2	N/A
Liberal Democrats	Alexander Sweet	390	15.2	+0.4
Liberal Democrats	Sakina Rizvi	348	13.5	−0.4
Conservative	Aeronwy Harris	337	13.1	+1.0
Conservative	Phivous Joannides	329	12.8	+1.2
Liberal Democrats	Michael Willett	285	11.1	−2.4
Conservative	Peter Sartori	283	11.0	+1.4
Turnout		2,578	31.3	+7.8
Labour hold		Swing		
Labour hold		Swing		
Labour hold		Swing		

=== Stroud Green ===
Stroud Green (3)
Party	Candidate	Votes	%	±%
Liberal Democrats	Laura Edge*	1,739	52.4	+34.5
Liberal Democrats	Edmund Butcher	1,530	46.1	+30.0
Liberal Democrats	Richard Wilson	1,438	43.3	+28.3
Labour	Peter Hillman**	941	28.4	−17.1
Labour	Peter Morton	911	27.4	−11.6
Labour	Reginald Rice**	847	25.5	−11.7
Green	Peter Budge	668	20.1	−11.5
Green	Julian Carter	453	13.6	−9.2
Green	Niall McAskie	424	12.8	−9.4
Conservative	Toby Boutle	207	6.2	−1.5
Conservative	Roy Norton	191	5.8	−1.9
Conservative	Christopher Vowles	190	5.7	−1.9
Turnout		3,330	39.8	+9.5
Liberal Democrats gain from Labour		Swing		
Liberal Democrats gain from Labour		Swing		
Liberal Democrats gain from Labour		Swing		

Peter Hillman was a sitting councillor for Tottenham Hale ward

Reginald Rice was a sitting councillor for Tottenham Green ward

=== Tottenham Green ===
Tottenham Green (3)
Party	Candidate	Votes	%	±%
Labour	Isidoros Diakides*	1,180	54.2	+1.1
Labour	Bernice Vanier	1,119	51.4	−0.7
Labour	Harry Lister*	1,111	51.0	−5.2
Liberal Democrats	Jill Gale	436	20.0	+8.8
Green	Christopher Madden	383	17.6	+2.2
Liberal Democrats	Francis Lay	356	16.3	+6.2
Conservative	Jonathan Howard	321	14.7	+2.1
Conservative	Susan Hinchcliffe	313	14.4	+2.7
Liberal Democrats	Zarko Stefan	243	11.2	+1.8
Conservative	James Orpin	236	10.8	+0.9
Independent	Frederick Woodward	85	3.9	−1.8
Independent	Salah Wakie	81	3.7	−0.3
Turnout		2,191	26.9	+4.4
Labour hold		Swing		
Labour hold		Swing		
Labour hold		Swing		

=== Tottenham Hale ===
Tottenham Hale (3)
Party	Candidate	Votes	%	±%
Labour	Lorna Reith*	1,439	58.8	+0.3
Labour	Alan Stanton*	1,376	56.2	+1.6
Labour	Sheik Thompson	1,246	50.9	−3.6
Liberal Democrats	Neville Collins	427	17.4	+2.9
Conservative	Olive Bates	424	17.3	+1.2
Conservative	Ann Harvey-Kirkwood	380	15.5	±0.0
Green	David Moore	346	14.1	+1.7
Conservative	Roger Kirkwood	330	13.5	−0.4
Liberal Democrats	Thuranie Jackson	317	13.0	−0.1
Liberal Democrats	Roderick Benziger	315	12.9	+0.8
Turnout		2,462	28.9	+7.3
Labour hold		Swing		
Labour hold		Swing		
Labour hold		Swing		

=== West Green ===
West Green (3)
Party	Candidate	Votes	%	±%
Labour	Eddie Griffith*	1,192	44.0	−13.3
Labour	Rahman Khan*	1,135	41.9	−14.3
Labour	Antonia Mallett	1,073	39.6	−14.2
Respect	Sait Akgul	626	23.1	N/A
Respect	Gary McFarlane	535	19.7	N/A
Green	Anne Gray	469	17.3	+3.8
Liberal Democrats	James Haskings	426	15.7	−0.6
Conservative	Jean Farmer	378	13.9	−3.8
Conservative	Phodis Evangelou	336	12.4	−3.5
Liberal Democrats	John Fynaut	329	12.1	+0.3
Liberal Democrats	Della Hirsch	328	12.1	+0.5
Conservative	Eyvind Andresen	324	12.0	−1.4
Turnout		2,722	33.7	+8.4
Labour hold		Swing		
Labour hold		Swing		
Labour hold		Swing		

=== White Hart Lane ===
White Hart Lane (3)
Party	Candidate	Votes	%	±%
Labour	Charles Adje*	1,370	51.5	+3.5
Labour	Gideon Bull*	1,344	50.5	−0.6
Labour	Elisabeth Santry*	1,195	44.9	+3.2
Conservative	Justin Hinchcliffe	737	27.7	−4.9
Conservative	Eric Lattimore	652	24.5	−7.9
Conservative	Thomas Mason	608	22.9	−11.4
Liberal Democrats	David Bartlett	330	12.4	+4.2
Liberal Democrats	Isabel de Sudea	269	10.1	+2.0
Liberal Democrats	Shantanu Guha	246	9.3	+1.9
Green	James Grinham	242	9.1	N/A
Green	Friedrich Ernst	230	8.6	−1.9
Turnout		2,675	34.1	+11.6
Labour hold		Swing		
Labour hold		Swing		
Labour hold		Swing		

=== Woodside ===
Woodside (3)
Party	Candidate	Votes	%	±%
Labour	George Meehan*	1,354	43.7	−12.1
Labour	Patrick Egan	1,353	43.7	−12.3
Labour	Jayantilal Patel*	1,318	42.6	−8.2
Liberal Democrats	Patricia Faulkner	1,224	39.5	+19.1
Liberal Democrats	Nighel Scott	1,126	36.4	+16.8
Liberal Democrats	Ajmal Masroor	1,087	35.1	+19.0
Green	Peter Corley	297	9.6	N/A
Conservative	Juliet Donnelly	293	9.5	−8.5
Conservative	Adam Newton	271	8.8	−6.8
Conservative	Stephen Shawcross	221	7.1	−8.2
Green	Shayamal Kataria	220	7.1	N/A
Turnout		3,117	38.1	+10.7
Labour hold		Swing		
Labour hold		Swing		
Labour hold		Swing		

== By-Elections ==
Highgate by-election, 6 March 2008
Party	Candidate	Votes	%	±%
Liberal Democrats	Rachel Allison	1,339	50.9	+8.4
Conservative	Peter Forrest	725	27.5	−4.9
Labour	David Heath	241	9.2	−2.5
Independent	Ralph Crisp	190	7.2	−5.8
Green	Sarah Mitchell	138	5.2	−6.6
Majority		614	23.4	
Turnout		2,633	32.9	−12.1
Liberal Democrats hold		Swing		

The by-election was called following the resignation of Cllr Justin Portess.

Alexandra by-election, 9 October 2008
Party	Candidate	Votes	%	±%
Liberal Democrats	Nigel Scott	1,460	49.9	−5.9
Labour	Joanna Christophides	772	26.4	+5.7
Conservative	David Douglas	443	15.2	+6.3
Green	James Patterson	221	7.6	−7.4
BNP	Frederick Halsey	27	0.9	N/A
Majority		688	23.5	
Turnout		2,923	35.0	−8.6
Liberal Democrats hold		Swing		

The by-election was called following the resignation of Cllr Wayne Hoban.

Seven Sisters by-election, 15 January 2009
Party	Candidate	Votes	%	±%
Labour	Joe Goldberg	1,032	37.1	−8.6
Conservative	Isaac Revah	968	34.8	+6.9
Liberal Democrats	David Schmitz	581	20.9	+8.1
Green	Anne Gray	166	6.0	−7.1
Independent	Lydia Rivlin	36	1.3	−23.5
Majority		64	2.3	
Turnout		2,783	31.1	+0.2
Labour hold		Swing		

The by-election was called following the death of Cllr Frederick Knight.
