= 2010 Haringey London Borough Council election =

Council election in London

2010 Haringey Council election
| ← 2006 | 7 May 2010 | 2014 → |

All 57 seats on Haringey London Borough Council
| | First party | Second party |
|---|---|---|
| Leader | Claire Kober | Robert Gorrie |
| Party | Labour | Liberal Democrats |
| Leader since | November 2008 | 8 May 2008 |
| Leader's seat | Seven Sisters | Hornsey |
| Last election | 30 seats | 27 seats |
| Seats won | 34 | 23 |
| Seat change | ▲4 | ▼4 |
| Popular vote | 113,773 | 102,265 |
| Percentage | 39.6% | 35.6% |
- Map of the results of the 2010 Haringey council election. Labour in red and Liberal Democrats in yellow.
Council control before election
Labour
Council control after election
Labour

Elections for Haringey Council in London, England were held on 6 May 2010.

== Results ==
Haringey Council election result 2010
| Party | Seats | Gains | Losses | Net gain/loss | Seats % | Votes % | Votes | +/− |
|---|---|---|---|---|---|---|---|---|
| Labour | 34 | 4 | 0 | +4 | 59.7 | 39.6 | 113,773 | |
| Liberal Democrats | 23 | 0 | 4 | -4 | 40.4 | 35.6 | 102,265 | |
| Conservative | 0 | | | | 0.0 | 14.6 | 41,909 | |
| Green | 0 | | | | 0.0 | 9.7 | 27,841 | |
| Independent | 0 | | | | 0.0 | 0.3 | 911 | |

== Ward results ==
=== Alexandra ===
Alexandra (3)
| Party | Candidate | Votes | % | ±% |
|---|---|---|---|---|
| Liberal Democrats | David Beacham* | 3,154 | 51.4 | −3.8 |
| Liberal Democrats | Juliet Solomon | 3,045 | 49.6 | −7.1 |
| Liberal Democrats | Nigel Scott* | 2,961 | 48.3 | −7.5 |
| Labour | Emma France | 1,603 | 26.1 | +5.4 |
| Labour | Samuel Davidsohn | 1,384 | 22.6 | +3.0 |
| Labour | Tim Waters | 1,199 | 19.5 | +0.5 |
| Green | Lucy Craig | 1,003 | 16.4 | +2.0 |
| Conservative | David Douglas | 942 | 15.4 | +6.5 |
| Conservative | Ali Ismail | 750 | 12.2 | +4.0 |
| Conservative | Mahi Parvin | 705 | 11.5 | +3.7 |
| Green | James Patterson | 528 | 8.6 | −3.0 |
| Green | David Rennie | 483 | 7.9 | −7.1 |
| Turnout | | 6,163 | 74.0 | +30.4 |
| Liberal Democrats hold | | Swing | | |
| Liberal Democrats hold | | Swing | | |
| Liberal Democrats hold | | Swing | | |

=== Bounds Green ===
Bounds Green (3)
| Party | Candidate | Votes | % | ±% |
|---|---|---|---|---|
| Labour | Matt Cooke* | 2,321 | 45.8 | +6.5 |
| Labour | Joanna Christophides | 2,219 | 43.8 | +6.1 |
| Labour | Ali Demirci* | 2,118 | 41.8 | +2.5 |
| Liberal Democrats | Cara Jenkinson | 1,829 | 36.1 | −3.2 |
| Liberal Democrats | Ron Aitken** | 1,739 | 34.3 | −3.1 |
| Liberal Democrats | John Oakes* | 1,580 | 31.2 | −6.6 |
| Conservative | Natalie Evans | 647 | 12.8 | +3.8 |
| Conservative | Mash Joy | 642 | 12.7 | +3.8 |
| Conservative | James Wild | 598 | 11.8 | +3.0 |
| Green | Andrea Phillips | 390 | 7.7 | −2.1 |
| Green | Helen Lipscomb | 367 | 7.2 | −4.5 |
| Green | Mike Shaughnessy | 255 | 5.0 | −3.9 |
| Turnout | | 5,087 | 57.6 | +17.9 |
| Labour hold | | Swing | | |
| Labour gain from Liberal Democrats | | Swing | | |
| Labour gain from Liberal Democrats | | Swing | | |

Ron Aitken was a sitting councillor for Crouch End ward

=== Bruce Grove ===
Bruce Grove (3)
| Party | Candidate | Votes | % | ±% |
|---|---|---|---|---|
| Labour | Dilek Dogus* | 2,774 | 59.0 | +4.4 |
| Labour | Stuart McNamara | 2,763 | 58.7 | +2.7 |
| Labour | Joseph Ejiofor | 2,680 | 57.0 | +4.7 |
| Liberal Democrats | Julia Glenn | 879 | 18.7 | +4.5 |
| Liberal Democrats | Ahmed Mohamed | 686 | 14.6 | +1.8 |
| Liberal Democrats | David Oxford | 660 | 14.0 | +3.1 |
| Conservative | Margaret Bradley | 598 | 12.7 | +0.6 |
| Conservative | Ann Harvey-Kirkwood | 538 | 11.4 | −0.9 |
| Conservative | Roger Kirkwood | 518 | 11.0 | +0.8 |
| Green | Tarik Dervish | 474 | 10.1 | −3.0 |
| Green | Nancy Hocking | 430 | 9.1 | −4.0 |
| Green | Noel Lynch | 328 | 7.0 | −5.1 |
| Turnout | | 4,755 | 54.1 | +24.4 |
| Labour hold | | Swing | | |
| Labour hold | | Swing | | |
| Labour hold | | Swing | | |

=== Crouch End ===
Crouch End (3)
| Party | Candidate | Votes | % | ±% |
|---|---|---|---|---|
| Liberal Democrats | Lyn Weber* | 3,501 | 54.6 | −1.3 |
| Liberal Democrats | David Winskill* | 3,119 | 48.6 | −4.3 |
| Liberal Democrats | Paul Strang | 3,102 | 48.4 | −6.0 |
| Labour | Richard Messingham | 1,375 | 21.4 | +3.4 |
| Labour | Duncan Weldon | 1,300 | 20.3 | +4.0 |
| Labour | Elin Williams | 1,231 | 19.2 | +4.2 |
| Conservative | David Allen | 974 | 15.2 | +1.7 |
| Green | Pamela Harling | 905 | 14.1 | −1.4 |
| Conservative | Paul Walker | 885 | 13.8 | +0.9 |
| Conservative | Edward West | 856 | 13.3 | +0.7 |
| Green | Duncan Ford | 722 | 11.3 | −3.7 |
| Green | Stewart Horne | 634 | 9.9 | −2.0 |
| Turnout | | 6,460 | 71.6 | +33.4 |
| Liberal Democrats hold | | Swing | | |
| Liberal Democrats hold | | Swing | | |
| Liberal Democrats hold | | Swing | | |

=== Fortis Green ===
Fortis Green (3)
| Party | Candidate | Votes | % | ±% |
|---|---|---|---|---|
| Liberal Democrats | Matt Davies* | 3,141 | 50.8 | −1.1 |
| Liberal Democrats | Sophie Erskine | 2,891 | 46.8 | −9.2 |
| Liberal Democrats | Martin Newton* | 2,768 | 44.8 | −6.5 |
| Labour | Sue Eedle | 1,382 | 22.4 | +7.3 |
| Labour | Matt Chorley | 1,333 | 21.6 | +6.8 |
| Labour | Robin Dunn | 1,304 | 21.1 | +6.7 |
| Conservative | Roderick Allen | 1,233 | 20.0 | +1.1 |
| Conservative | Evan Price | 1,163 | 18.8 | +0.1 |
| Conservative | Julian Sherwood | 1,063 | 17.2 | −0.2 |
| Green | Claire Lewis | 643 | 10.4 | −2.5 |
| Green | Kathryn Dean | 606 | 9.8 | −2.0 |
| Green | Alex Pickering | 476 | 7.7 | −2.2 |
| Turnout | | 6,212 | 69.6 | +30.8 |
| Liberal Democrats hold | | Swing | | |
| Liberal Democrats hold | | Swing | | |
| Liberal Democrats hold | | Swing | | |

=== Harringay ===
Harringay (3)
| Party | Candidate | Votes | % | ±% |
|---|---|---|---|---|
| Liberal Democrats | Karen Alexander* | 2,224 | 42.9 | −1.2 |
| Labour | Gina Adamou* | 2,159 | 41.7 | −0.6 |
| Liberal Democrats | David Schmitz | 1,987 | 38.3 | +2.1 |
| Labour | Nora Mulready | 1,974 | 38.1 | +2.1 |
| Liberal Democrats | Chris Ford | 1,800 | 34.7 | −4.4 |
| Labour | Jon Vellapah | 1,601 | 30.9 | −3.6 |
| Green | Rebecca Bunting | 602 | 11.6 | ±0.0 |
| Green | Kerry Smith-Jefferys | 555 | 10.7 | −0.9 |
| Conservative | Tim Caines | 447 | 8.6 | +2.3 |
| Conservative | Christine Allicock | 435 | 8.4 | +2.9 |
| Conservative | Stephen Noble | 407 | 7.9 | +2.8 |
| Green | Karis Tanner | 368 | 7.1 | −4.3 |
| Independent | Matt Cuthbert | 292 | 5.6 | N/A |
| Turnout | | 5,208 | 59.5 | +22.9 |
| Liberal Democrats hold | | Swing | | |
| Labour hold | | Swing | | |
| Liberal Democrats hold | | Swing | | |

=== Highgate ===
Highgate (3)
| Party | Candidate | Votes | % | ±% |
|---|---|---|---|---|
| Liberal Democrats | Rachel Allison* | 3,166 | 54.7 | +12.2 |
| Liberal Democrats | Bob Hare* | 2,616 | 45.2 | +2.4 |
| Liberal Democrats | Neil Williams* | 2,425 | 41.9 | +2.7 |
| Conservative | Robin Campbell-Burt | 1,559 | 26.9 | −5.5 |
| Conservative | Juliet Donnelly | 1,405 | 24.3 | −6.9 |
| Conservative | Aaron Radford-Wattley | 1,283 | 22.2 | −7.6 |
| Labour | Caroline Graham | 1,099 | 19.0 | +7.5 |
| Labour | David Heath | 928 | 16.0 | +4.3 |
| Labour | Vivienne Manheim | 867 | 15.0 | +5.3 |
| Green | Christopher Cope | 586 | 10.1 | −1.7 |
| Green | Lucy Shanahan | 483 | 8.3 | −1.4 |
| Green | Andy Nicolson | 476 | 8.2 | +0.9 |
| Turnout | | 5,814 | 70.5 | +25.5 |
| Liberal Democrats hold | | Swing | | |
| Liberal Democrats hold | | Swing | | |
| Liberal Democrats hold | | Swing | | |

=== Hornsey ===
Hornsey (3)
| Party | Candidate | Votes | % | ±% |
|---|---|---|---|---|
| Liberal Democrats | Robert Gorrie* | 2,609 | 44.1 | +0.2 |
| Liberal Democrats | Errol Reid* | 2,589 | 43.8 | −4.6 |
| Liberal Democrats | Monica Whyte* | 2,511 | 42.4 | −2.9 |
| Labour | John Blake | 2,053 | 34.7 | +2.2 |
| Labour | Eugene Akwasi-Ayisi | 1,751 | 29.6 | −2.7 |
| Labour | Makbule Gunes | 1,672 | 28.3 | −1.7 |
| Green | Mary Hogan | 693 | 11.7 | −1.9 |
| Green | Peter Budge | 628 | 10.6 | −3.8 |
| Conservative | Lionel Eddy | 562 | 9.5 | +3.5 |
| Conservative | Peter Gilbert | 554 | 9.4 | +3.8 |
| Green | Nicholas Mole | 532 | 9.0 | −2.3 |
| Conservative | Lloyda Fanusie | 526 | 8.9 | +3.6 |
| UKIP | Jeremy Ross | 136 | 2.3 | N/A |
| Turnout | | 5,947 | 66.8 | +26.9 |
| Liberal Democrats hold | | Swing | | |
| Liberal Democrats hold | | Swing | | |
| Liberal Democrats hold | | Swing | | |

=== Muswell Hill ===
Muswell Hill (3)
| Party | Candidate | Votes | % | ±% |
|---|---|---|---|---|
| Liberal Democrats | Gail Engert* | 3,166 | 53.8 | −5.1 |
| Liberal Democrats | Jonathan Bloch* | 3,133 | 53.2 | −6.4 |
| Liberal Democrats | Jim Jenks | 2,683 | 45.6 | −9.8 |
| Labour | Christine Heath | 1,447 | 24.6 | +4.1 |
| Labour | Mark Grosskopf | 1,178 | 20.0 | +1.0 |
| Labour | Tom Williams | 1,166 | 19.8 | +1.0 |
| Conservative | Daphne Forrest | 886 | 15.0 | +6.4 |
| Conservative | David Grant | 834 | 14.2 | +4.0 |
| Green | Jeremy Green | 808 | 13.7 | −0.2 |
| Conservative | Nicholas Jones | 771 | 13.1 | +5.0 |
| Green | Joyce Rosser | 572 | 9.7 | −1.2 |
| Green | Philip Magnus | 548 | 9.3 | +0.6 |
| Turnout | | 5,925 | 73.5 | +30.0 |
| Liberal Democrats hold | | Swing | | |
| Liberal Democrats hold | | Swing | | |
| Liberal Democrats hold | | Swing | | |

=== Noel Park ===
Noel Park (3)
| Party | Candidate | Votes | % | ±% |
|---|---|---|---|---|
| Labour | Pauline Gibson | 2,149 | 44.4 | +2.0 |
| Labour | James Stewart | 2,026 | 41.8 | +3.2 |
| Labour | Alan Strickland | 1,864 | 38.5 | +0.5 |
| Liberal Democrats | Viv Ross | 1,743 | 36.0 | −6.0 |
| Liberal Democrats | Nevres Kemal | 1,616 | 33.4 | −5.5 |
| Liberal Democrats | Balan Sisupalan | 1,407 | 29.0 | −5.7 |
| Conservative | Alan Dobbie* | 718 | 14.8 | −27.6 |
| Conservative | Gulcan Gul | 616 | 12.7 | +3.7 |
| Conservative | Chris Donnelly | 610 | 12.6 | +4.0 |
| Green | Katie Boswell | 429 | 8.9 | −0.8 |
| Green | William McGowan | 355 | 7.3 | +0.4 |
| Green | Ben Levitas | 264 | 5.5 | N/A |
| Independent | Sonja Scantlebury-Camara | 145 | 3.0 | N/A |
| Turnout | | 4,872 | 55.5 | +22.9 |
| Labour hold | | Swing | | |
| Labour gain from Liberal Democrats | | Swing | | |
| Labour gain from Liberal Democrats | | Swing | | |

=== Northumberland Park ===
Northumberland Park (3)
| Party | Candidate | Votes | % | ±% |
|---|---|---|---|---|
| Labour | John Bevan* | 2,863 | 59.9 | −2.2 |
| Labour | Sheila Peacock* | 2,735 | 57.3 | −5.3 |
| Labour | Kaushika Amin* | 2,681 | 56.1 | −4.2 |
| Liberal Democrats | Leo Leonida | 686 | 14.4 | +3.4 |
| Liberal Democrats | Valerie Mortimer | 522 | 10.9 | +0.2 |
| Conservative | Roger Bradley | 509 | 10.7 | −2.8 |
| Conservative | Jason Obeng | 507 | 10.6 | −0.6 |
| Conservative | Jane Manase | 506 | 10.6 | −0.4 |
| Liberal Democrats | Bambos Paphitis | 363 | 7.6 | −2.9 |
| Green | Ursula Berry | 243 | 5.1 | −3.9 |
| Green | Nick Ceasar | 217 | 4.5 | N/A |
| Green | Andrew Taylor | 189 | 4.0 | N/A |
| Turnout | | 4,823 | 56.2 | +26.7 |
| Labour hold | | Swing | | |
| Labour hold | | Swing | | |
| Labour hold | | Swing | | |

=== Seven Sisters ===
Seven Sisters (3)
| Party | Candidate | Votes | % | ±% |
|---|---|---|---|---|
| Labour | Joe Goldberg* | 2,807 | 54.3 | +8.6 |
| Labour | Dhiren Basu* | 2,710 | 52.5 | +6.0 |
| Labour | Claire Kober* | 2,642 | 51.1 | +8.1 |
| Conservative | Mahir Gul | 1,073 | 20.9 | −7.0 |
| Conservative | Isaac Revah | 1,068 | 20.8 | −5.3 |
| Conservative | Justin Hinchcliffe | 995 | 19.4 | −5.4 |
| Liberal Democrats | Monday Allende | 776 | 15.1 | +2.3 |
| Liberal Democrats | Sofia Civik | 754 | 14.7 | +3.0 |
| Liberal Democrats | Zarko Stefan | 612 | 11.9 | +1.6 |
| Green | David Bennie | 521 | 10.1 | −3.0 |
| Green | Daniel Rosenberg | 355 | 6.9 | −4.8 |
| Green | Bernard Bulaitis | 349 | 6.8 | N/A |
| Turnout | | 5,210 | 56.6 | +25.7 |
| Labour hold | | Swing | | |
| Labour hold | | Swing | | |
| Labour hold | | Swing | | |

=== St Ann’s ===
St Ann’s (3)
| Party | Candidate | Votes | % | ±% |
|---|---|---|---|---|
| Labour | David Browne | 2,469 | 51.5 | +5.0 |
| Labour | Nilgun Canver* | 2,315 | 48.3 | +2.2 |
| Labour | Zena Brabazon | 2,241 | 46.8 | +5.4 |
| Liberal Democrats | Mark Alexander | 1,201 | 25.1 | +9.9 |
| Liberal Democrats | Neville Collins | 1,129 | 23.6 | +10.1 |
| Liberal Democrats | Brian Haley* | 1,088 | 22.7 | −23.8 |
| Conservative | Phivos Joannides | 601 | 12.5 | −0.3 |
| Conservative | Joyce Oyeyi-Effiong | 596 | 12.4 | −0.7 |
| Conservative | Sam Rozati | 558 | 11.6 | +0.6 |
| Green | Dennis Bury | 432 | 9.0 | −10.5 |
| Green | Ryan Taylor | 427 | 8.9 | N/A |
| Green | Desmond Gilmartin | 371 | 7.7 | N/A |
| TUSC | Simon Hester | 202 | 4.2 | −18.3 |
| Turnout | | 4,823 | 52.1 | +20.8 |
| Labour hold | | Swing | | |
| Labour hold | | Swing | | |
| Labour hold | | Swing | | |

=== Stroud Green ===
Stroud Green (3)
| Party | Candidate | Votes | % | ±% |
|---|---|---|---|---|
| Liberal Democrats | Ed Butcher* | 2,889 | 48.3 | +2.2 |
| Liberal Democrats | Katherine Reece | 2,551 | 42.6 | −9.8 |
| Liberal Democrats | Richard Wilson* | 2,427 | 40.6 | −2.7 |
| Labour | John Keever | 1,591 | 26.6 | −1.8 |
| Labour | Jo-Ann Robertson | 1,562 | 26.1 | −1.3 |
| Labour | Jayanti Patel** | 1,522 | 25.4 | −0.1 |
| Green | Sarah Cope | 1,234 | 20.6 | +0.5 |
| Green | Anna Bragga | 1,209 | 20.2 | +6.6 |
| Green | Jayne Forbes | 1,171 | 19.6 | +6.8 |
| Conservative | Roy Norton | 451 | 7.5 | +1.3 |
| Conservative | Dorothy Cowan | 436 | 7.3 | +1.5 |
| Conservative | Kay Curtis | 423 | 7.1 | +1.4 |
| Turnout | | 6,007 | 68.9 | +29.1 |
| Liberal Democrats hold | | Swing | | |
| Liberal Democrats hold | | Swing | | |
| Liberal Democrats hold | | Swing | | |

Jayanti Patel was a sitting councillor for Woodside ward

=== Tottenham Green ===
Tottenham Green (3)
| Party | Candidate | Votes | % | ±% |
|---|---|---|---|---|
| Labour | Isidoros Diakides* | 2,643 | 58.7 | +4.5 |
| Labour | Bernice Vanier* | 2,565 | 57.0 | +5.6 |
| Labour | Richard Watson | 2,310 | 51.3 | +0.3 |
| Liberal Democrats | Nicholas da Costa | 898 | 19.9 | −0.1 |
| Liberal Democrats | Asha Kaur | 707 | 15.7 | −0.6 |
| Liberal Democrats | Alex Sweet | 669 | 14.9 | +3.7 |
| Green | Jill Boswell | 494 | 11.0 | −6.6 |
| Conservative | Susan Hinchcliffe | 483 | 10.7 | −3.7 |
| Green | Emily Slater | 482 | 10.7 | N/A |
| Conservative | William Hoyle | 454 | 10.1 | −4.6 |
| Green | John Dixon | 448 | 9.9 | N/A |
| Conservative | James Orpin | 422 | 9.4 | −1.4 |
| Independent | Neville Watson | 210 | 4.7 | N/A |
| Turnout | | 4,528 | 49.2 | +22.3 |
| Labour hold | | Swing | | |
| Labour hold | | Swing | | |
| Labour hold | | Swing | | |

=== Tottenham Hale ===
Tottenham Hale (3)
| Party | Candidate | Votes | % | ±% |
|---|---|---|---|---|
| Labour | Lorna Reith* | 2,823 | 61.8 | +3.0 |
| Labour | Reg Rice | 2,674 | 58.5 | +7.6 |
| Labour | Alan Stanton* | 2,622 | 57.4 | +1.2 |
| Liberal Democrats | Carole Mitchell | 724 | 15.8 | −1.6 |
| Conservative | Melike Egin | 664 | 14.5 | −2.8 |
| Liberal Democrats | Thuranie Aruliah | 609 | 13.3 | +0.3 |
| Conservative | Peter Forrest | 597 | 13.1 | −2.4 |
| Conservative | William Spring | 595 | 13.0 | −0.5 |
| Liberal Democrats | Steven Watson | 568 | 12.4 | −0.5 |
| Green | Mark Anstee | 302 | 6.6 | −7.5 |
| Green | Lianne Bettis | 275 | 6.0 | N/A |
| Independent | Sheik Thompson* | 264 | 5.8 | −45.1 |
| Green | Argyros Arghyrou | 240 | 5.3 | N/A |
| Turnout | | 4,608 | 52.0 | +23.1 |
| Labour hold | | Swing | | |
| Labour hold | | Swing | | |
| Labour hold | | Swing | | |

=== West Green ===
West Green (3)
| Party | Candidate | Votes | % | ±% |
|---|---|---|---|---|
| Labour | Eddie Griffith* | 2,471 | 54.5 | +10.5 |
| Labour | Toni Mallett* | 2,264 | 49.9 | +10.3 |
| Labour | Gmmh Khan* | 2,262 | 49.9 | +8.0 |
| Liberal Democrats | Ngozi Chiejina | 926 | 20.4 | +4.7 |
| Liberal Democrats | Daniel Truby | 866 | 19.1 | +7.0 |
| Liberal Democrats | Colin Heinink | 826 | 18.2 | +6.1 |
| Conservative | Dilay Yilmaz | 803 | 17.7 | +3.8 |
| Conservative | James Mensah | 780 | 17.2 | +4.8 |
| Conservative | Jonathan Fisher | 761 | 16.8 | +4.8 |
| Green | Vicky Cann | 595 | 13.1 | −4.2 |
| Green | George Mackie | 333 | 7.3 | N/A |
| Green | Varya Shaw | 325 | 7.2 | N/A |
| Turnout | | 4,575 | 53.5 | +19.8 |
| Labour hold | | Swing | | |
| Labour hold | | Swing | | |
| Labour hold | | Swing | | |

=== White Hart Lane ===
White Hart Lane (3)
| Party | Candidate | Votes | % | ±% |
|---|---|---|---|---|
| Labour | Gideon Bull* | 2,499 | 54.8 | +4.3 |
| Labour | Charles Adje* | 2,363 | 51.8 | +0.3 |
| Labour | Anne Stennett | 2,230 | 48.9 | +4.0 |
| Conservative | Diren Yilmaz | 1,142 | 25.1 | −2.6 |
| Conservative | Janet Harris | 972 | 21.3 | −3.2 |
| Conservative | Dan Isebor | 875 | 19.2 | −3.7 |
| Liberal Democrats | Margaret Fowler | 716 | 15.7 | +3.3 |
| Liberal Democrats | Aseye Akonou | 619 | 13.6 | +3.5 |
| Liberal Democrats | Paul Head | 613 | 13.4 | +4.1 |
| Green | Ruth Green | 377 | 8.3 | −0.8 |
| Green | Friedrich-Paul Ernst | 282 | 6.2 | −2.4 |
| Green | Nadja von Massow | 149 | 3.3 | N/A |
| Turnout | | 4,585 | 53.7 | +19.6 |
| Labour hold | | Swing | | |
| Labour hold | | Swing | | |
| Labour hold | | Swing | | |

=== Woodside ===
Woodside (3)
| Party | Candidate | Votes | % | ±% |
|---|---|---|---|---|
| Labour | Pat Egan* | 2,300 | 47.4 | +3.7 |
| Labour | George Meehan* | 2,217 | 45.7 | +2.0 |
| Labour | Ann Waters | 2,031 | 41.9 | −0.7 |
| Liberal Democrats | Ian Simpson | 1,733 | 35.7 | −3.8 |
| Liberal Democrats | Angela Kawa | 1,633 | 33.7 | −2.7 |
| Liberal Democrats | John Thompson | 1,487 | 30.7 | −4.4 |
| Conservative | William Golden | 598 | 12.3 | +2.8 |
| Conservative | Neil O'Shea | 551 | 11.4 | +2.6 |
| Conservative | Marcin Jamroz | 531 | 11.0 | +3.9 |
| Green | Kate Worley | 320 | 6.6 | −3.0 |
| Green | Peter Whitworth | 290 | 6.0 | −1.1 |
| Green | Robert Cowan | 288 | 5.9 | N/A |
| Turnout | | 4,886 | 56.3 | +18.2 |
| Labour hold | | Swing | | |
| Labour hold | | Swing | | |
| Labour hold | | Swing | | |
