= 2002 Haringey London Borough Council election =

2002 local election in England

The 2002 Haringey London Borough Council election took place on 2 May 2002 to elect all members of Haringey London Borough Council in England. The election was held on new boundaries This was on the same day as other local elections around the country.

== Results ==
Haringey local election result 2002
Party	Seats	Gains	Losses	Net gain/loss	Seats %	Votes %	Votes	+/−
Labour	42			-12				
Liberal Democrats	15			+12				
Conservative	0			-2				
Green	0			±0				

== Results by Ward ==
=== Alexandra ===
Alexandra (3)
Party	Candidate	Votes	%	±%
Liberal Democrats	Susan Oatway	1,781	51.5	
Liberal Democrats	David Beacham	1,763	51.0	
Liberal Democrats	Wayne Hoban	1,664	48.1	
Labour	Peter Droussioutis*	1,031	29.8	
Labour	Stuart McNamara	901	26.1	
Labour	Michael Hutson-Cummins	885	25.6	
Conservative	Stefan Kerner	394	11.4	
Conservative	Toby Boutle	393	11.4	
Green	David Rennie	380	11.0	
Conservative	Julian Sherwood	373	10.8	
Green	Jeremy Seabrook	363	10.5	
Socialist Alliance	Philip Foxe	185	5.4	
Turnout		3,465	43.5	
Liberal Democrats win (new seat)				
Liberal Democrats win (new seat)				
Liberal Democrats win (new seat)				

=== Bounds Green ===
Bounds Green (3)
Party	Candidate	Votes	%	±%
Labour	Vivienne Manheim*	1,040	50.5	
Labour	Thomas Davidson*	1,034	50.2	
Labour	Bernard Miller	944	45.8	
Liberal Democrats	Eleanor Hogg	440	21.3	
Conservative	David Grant	399	19.4	
Liberal Democrats	Nigel Scott	397	19.3	
Liberal Democrats	Glen Nichol	379	18.4	
Conservative	Kevin Smith	368	17.9	
Green	Peter McAskie	342	16.6	
Conservative	Ernle Money	341	16.5	
Turnout		2,076	26.8	
Labour win (new seat)				
Labour win (new seat)				
Labour win (new seat)				

=== Bruce Grove ===
Bruce Grove (3)
Party	Candidate	Votes	%	±%
Labour	Herbert Brown*	1,277	70.4	
Labour	James Dawson	1,148	63.3	
Labour	Irene Robertson*	1,142	62.9	
Green	Jamie Hewett	268	14.8	
Conservative	Rebecca Baty	210	11.6	
Conservative	Margaret Bradley	201	11.1	
Conservative	Aeronwy Harris	171	9.4	
Liberal Democrats	Isobel de Sudea	160	8.8	
Liberal Democrats	Edward Purssell	159	8.8	
Liberal Democrats	Della Hirsch	123	6.8	
Turnout		1,822	23.2	
Labour win (new seat)				
Labour win (new seat)				
Labour win (new seat)				

=== Crouch End ===
Crouch End (3)
Party	Candidate	Votes	%	±%
Liberal Democrats	David Winskill	1,335	48.8	
Liberal Democrats	Ronald Aitken	1,334	48.8	
Liberal Democrats	Peter Floyd	1,329	48.6	
Labour	Terence O'Sullivan	745	27.2	
Labour	Colin Sandbach*	745	27.2	
Labour	Paul Sharma	724	26.5	
Green	Steve Marchen	465	17.0	
Green	Rupert Rumney	346	12.6	
Conservative	Ewan Cameron	328	12.0	
Conservative	Paul Stephenson	300	11.0	
Conservative	Edward Webb	288	10.5	
Turnout		2,743	32.1	
Liberal Democrats win (new seat)				
Liberal Democrats win (new seat)				
Liberal Democrats win (new seat)				

=== Fortis Green ===
Fortis Green (3)
Party	Candidate	Votes	%	±%
Liberal Democrats	Barbara Fabian	1,286	40.4	
Liberal Democrats	Matthew Davies	1,274	40.0	
Liberal Democrats	Steve Gilbert	1,252	39.3	
Conservative	David Allen	967	30.4	
Conservative	Yvonne Rivlin	941	29.6	
Conservative	Charles Jackson	933	29.3	
Labour	Maureen Dewar*	688	21.6	
Labour	Iris Josiah*	638	20.0	
Labour	Alan Richardson*	636	20.0	
Green	Simon Redfern	363	11.4	
Green	Christopher Piesold	240	7.5	
Turnout		3,188	39.5	
Liberal Democrats win (new seat)				
Liberal Democrats win (new seat)				
Liberal Democrats win (new seat)				

=== Harringay ===
Harringay (3)
Party	Candidate	Votes	%	±%
Labour	Gina Adamou*	1,014	49.5	
Labour	Ronald Blanchard*	869	42.4	
Labour	Takki Sulaiman*	844	41.2	
Green	Judy Gahagan	413	20.2	
Conservative	Hasan Bilginer	401	19.6	
Liberal Democrats	David Bartlett	383	18.7	
Conservative	Kshitis Das	376	18.4	
Green	Peter Budge	359	17.5	
Green	Adam Dorken	306	14.9	
Conservative	Nityanand Ragnuth	306	14.9	
Liberal Democrats	David Oxford	267	13.0	
Liberal Democrats	Marcus Speer	235	11.5	
Turnout		2,058	25.9	
Labour win (new seat)				
Labour win (new seat)				
Labour win (new seat)				

=== Highgate ===
Highgate (3)
Party	Candidate	Votes	%	±%
Liberal Democrats	Melanie Simpson	1,218	43.4	
Liberal Democrats	Walter Hare	1,173	41.8	
Liberal Democrats	Neil Williams	1,123	40.0	
Conservative	Peter Forrest*	952	33.9	
Conservative	Roderick Allen	884	31.5	
Conservative	Mark Coalter	843	30.0	
Labour	Diana Walsh	597	21.3	
Labour	David Jackson	565	20.1	
Labour	Michael Knighton	521	18.6	
Green	Cornell Sandvoss	278	9.9	
Turnout		2,810	35.4	
Liberal Democrats win (new seat)				
Liberal Democrats win (new seat)				
Liberal Democrats win (new seat)				

=== Hornsey ===
Hornsey (3)
Party	Candidate	Votes	%	±%
Labour	Judith Bax*	980	47.6	
Labour	Dequincy Prescott	919	44.6	
Labour	Richard Milner	903	43.9	
Liberal Democrats	Lindsay Northover	500	24.3	
Liberal Democrats	Roderick Benziger	485	23.6	
Green	Karine Pellaumail	352	17.1	
Liberal Democrats	Keith Tarn	348	16.9	
Green	Peter Norris	346	16.8	
Conservative	Sally Lumb	272	13.2	
Conservative	Catherine MacDougall	236	11.5	
Conservative	Ian Stewart	227	11.0	
Socialist Alliance	Geoff Palmer	129	6.3	
Turnout		2,068	27.3	
Labour win (new seat)				
Labour win (new seat)				
Labour win (new seat)				

=== Muswell Hill ===
Muswell Hill (3)
Party	Candidate	Votes	%	±%
Liberal Democrats	Lynne Featherstone*	1,899	62.0	
Liberal Democrats	Jonathan Bloch	1,897	61.9	
Liberal Democrats	Ross Laird*	1,836	59.9	
Labour	Catherine Stafford*	594	19.4	
Labour	William Freeman	585	19.1	
Labour	Claire Kober	580	18.9	
Green	Alexandra Metcalf	302	9.9	
Conservative	Anne Forrest	274	8.9	
Green	Mark Ackary	273	8.9	
Conservative	David Douglas	265	8.6	
Conservative	Kenneth Mansfield	257	8.4	
Turnout		3,067	39.1	
Liberal Democrats win (new seat)				
Liberal Democrats win (new seat)				
Liberal Democrats win (new seat)				

=== Noel Park ===
Noel Park (3)
Party	Candidate	Votes	%	±%
Labour	Alan Dobbie	982	53.3	
Labour	Jean Brown*	975	52.9	
Labour	Narendra Makanji*	934	50.7	
Liberal Democrats	Kathleen Osborne	342	18.6	
Conservative	Dorothy Cowan	307	16.7	
Liberal Democrats	Reece Bevan	293	15.9	
Conservative	Patricia Mansfield	270	14.7	
Green	Dorothy Palmer	265	14.4	
Conservative	Wendy Whale	255	13.8	
Liberal Democrats	Michael Willett	222	12.1	
Socialist Alliance	Sean Wallis	105	5.7	
Independent	William Golden	66	3.6	
Turnout		1,849	23.1	
Labour win (new seat)				
Labour win (new seat)				
Labour win (new seat)				

=== Northumberland Park ===
Northumberland Park (3)
Party	Candidate	Votes	%	±%
Labour	Sheila Peacock*	1,002	68.8	
Labour	John Bevan	968	66.5	
Labour	Ray Dodds*	960	65.9	
Conservative	Roger Bradley	201	13.8	
Liberal Democrats	Alan Aris	160	11.0	
Conservative	Gladys Weeks	154	10.6	
Liberal Democrats	Francis Coleman	152	10.4	
Conservative	Joseph Ocwet	147	10.1	
Liberal Democrats	Valerie Silbiger	140	9.6	
Green	David Burns	137	9.4	
Independent	James McGlynn	47	3.2	
Turnout		1,461	19.5	
Labour win (new seat)				
Labour win (new seat)				
Labour win (new seat)				

=== Seven Sisters ===
Seven Sisters (3)
Party	Candidate	Votes	%	±%
Labour	Dhirendra Basu*	1,073	60.9	
Labour	Frederick Knight*	1,029	58.4	
Labour	Richard Reynolds*	1,019	57.9	
Conservative	Michael Gabbay	270	15.3	
Conservative	Kay Curtis	263	14.9	
Conservative	Cecil Pinnock	252	14.3	
Green	Mary Hogan	226	12.8	
Liberal Democrats	David Fisher	205	11.6	
Socialist Alliance	Sarah Miller	174	9.9	
Liberal Democrats	Deborah Park	159	9.0	
Liberal Democrats	Andrew Shepherd	113	6.4	
Turnout		1,764	21.7	
Labour win (new seat)				
Labour win (new seat)				
Labour win (new seat)				

=== St Ann's ===
St Ann's (3)
Party	Candidate	Votes	%	±%
Labour	Azize Canver*	1,010	54.8	
Labour	Brian Haley*	981	53.2	
Labour	Robert Harriss*	950	51.5	
Green	Ursula Bury	368	20.0	
Socialist Alliance	Simon Hester	324	17.6	
Liberal Democrats	Caroline Shepherd	273	14.8	
Liberal Democrats	Timothy Nichols	257	13.9	
Liberal Democrats	Frank Heller	248	13.5	
Conservative	Haralambos Stavrou	223	12.1	
Conservative	Emma Varley	213	11.6	
Conservative	Calistra Toussaint	177	9.6	
Turnout		1,845	23.5	
Labour win (new seat)				
Labour win (new seat)				
Labour win (new seat)				

=== Stroud Green ===
Stroud Green (3)
Party	Candidate	Votes	%	±%
Labour	Josephine Irwin*	1,108	45.5	
Labour	Katherine Wynne	949	39.0	
Labour	Andrew Krokou	905	37.2	
Green	Jayne Forbes	768	31.6	
Green	Vicky Oliver	556	22.8	
Green	Gillian Piesold	541	22.2	
Liberal Democrats	Stephen Tong	436	17.9	
Liberal Democrats	Mark Thatcher	391	16.1	
Liberal Democrats	John Fynaut	364	15.0	
Conservative	Elizabeth Henderson	188	7.7	
Conservative	Roy Norton	188	7.7	
Conservative	Edward Butt	184	7.6	
Socialist Alliance	Anne McArthur	145	6.0	
Socialist Alliance	Linda Lennard	141	5.8	
Socialist Labour	Steve Cook	112	4.6	
Turnout		2,441	30.3	
Labour win (new seat)				
Labour win (new seat)				
Labour win (new seat)				

=== Tottenham Green ===
Tottenham Green (3)
Party	Candidate	Votes	%	±%
Labour	Henry Lister	974	56.2	
Labour	Isidores Diakides*	920	53.1	
Labour	Reginald Rice*	903	52.1	
Green	Suzy Almond	266	15.4	
Conservative	Judith Flynn	218	12.6	
Independent	Perdeep Gill	211	12.2	
Conservative	Georgina Walden	202	11.7	
Liberal Democrats	David Burridge	194	11.2	
Liberal Democrats	Ryan Cockman	175	10.1	
Conservative	James Orpin	172	9.9	
Liberal Democrats	Richard Stevens	163	9.4	
Socialist Alliance	Weyman Bennett	159	9.2	
Socialist Alliance	Frederick Woodward	99	5.7	
Independent	Salah Wakie	69	4.0	
Turnout		1,738	22.5	
Labour win (new seat)				
Labour win (new seat)				
Labour win (new seat)				

=== Tottenham Hale ===
Tottenham Hale (3)
Party	Candidate	Votes	%	±%
Labour	Peter Hillman	979	58.5	
Labour	Alan Stanton*	913	54.6	
Labour	David Prendergast*	911	54.5	
Conservative	Lloyda Fanusie	269	16.1	
Conservative	Susan Hinchcliffe	260	15.5	
Liberal Democrats	Neville Collins	243	14.5	
Conservative	Caesar Lalobo	233	13.9	
Liberal Democrats	Kevin Greenan	219	13.1	
Green	Paul Butler	208	12.4	
Liberal Democrats	Lynn Hopkins	202	12.1	
Socialist Alliance	Gary McFarlane	107	6.4	
Turnout		1,681	21.6	
Labour win (new seat)				
Labour win (new seat)				
Labour win (new seat)				

=== West Green ===
West Green (3)
Party	Candidate	Votes	%	±%
Labour	Eddie Griffith	1,100	57.3	
Labour	Gmmh Khan*	1,079	56.2	
Labour	Erline Prescott	1,033	53.8	
Conservative	Jean Farmer	340	17.7	
Liberal Democrats	James Haskings	313	16.3	
Conservative	Michael Flynn	306	15.9	
Green	Dennis Bury	259	13.5	
Conservative	Darshan Suri	257	13.4	
Liberal Democrats	Andrew Hort	227	11.8	
Liberal Democrats	Roger Mothersdale	223	11.6	
Socialist Alliance	Terence Burton	142	7.4	
Socialist Alliance	Anslem Samuel	116	6.0	
Turnout		1,926	25.3	
Labour win (new seat)				
Labour win (new seat)				
Labour win (new seat)				

=== White Hart Lane ===
White Hart Lane (3)
Party	Candidate	Votes	%	±%
Labour	Gideon Bull*	869	51.1	
Labour	Charles Adje*	815	48.0	
Labour	Elisabeth Santry	709	41.7	
Conservative	Tony Cox	583	34.3	
Conservative	Justin Hinchcliffe	554	32.6	
Conservative	Eric Lattimore	550	32.4	
Green	Friedrich-Paul Ernst	178	10.5	
Liberal Democrats	Mary Hort	140	8.2	
Liberal Democrats	Martin Hay	137	8.1	
Liberal Democrats	Frederick Nicholls	126	7.4	
Turnout		1,706	22.5	
Labour win (new seat)				
Labour win (new seat)				
Labour win (new seat)				

=== Woodside ===
Woodside (3)
Party	Candidate	Votes	%	±%
Labour	Denis Dillon*	1,227	56.0	
Labour	George Meehan*	1,222	55.8	
Labour	Jayanti Patel*	1,112	50.8	
Liberal Democrats	Shantanu Guhu	448	20.4	
Liberal Democrats	Leslie Brissett	429	19.6	
Conservative	Rachel Lofts	395	18.0	
Liberal Democrats	Hewa Jaff	352	16.1	
Conservative	Iain Hasnip	342	15.6	
Conservative	David Nichol	335	15.3	
Socialist Alliance	Keith Flett	139	6.3	
Turnout		2,197	27.4	
Labour win (new seat)				
Labour win (new seat)				
Labour win (new seat)				

== By-Elections ==
Tottenham Hale by-election, 23 January 2003
Party	Candidate	Votes	%	±%
Labour	Lorna Reith	691	46.4	−8.1
Conservative	Tony Cox	434	29.1	+13.0
Liberal Democrats	Neville Collins	296	19.9	+5.4
Socialist Alliance	Stephen Cracknell	68	4.6	−1.8
Majority		257	17.3	
Turnout		1,489	18.8	−2.8
Labour hold		Swing		

The by-election was called following the resignation of Cllr David Prendergast.

Stroud Green by-election, 29 January 2004
Party	Candidate	Votes	%	±%
Liberal Democrats	Laura Edge	1,135	53.7	+35.8
Labour	William Freeman	408	19.3	−26.2
Green	Jayne Forbes	403	19.1	−12.5
Conservative	Toby Boutle	166	7.9	+0.2
Majority		727	34.4	
Turnout		2,112	26.0	−4.3
Liberal Democrats gain from Labour		Swing		

The by-election was called following the resignation of Cllr Josephine Irwin.

Muswell Hill by-election, 4 March 2004
Party	Candidate	Votes	%	±%
Liberal Democrats	Gail Engert	1,739	69.5	+9.6
Labour	Claire Kober	321	12.8	−6.1
Conservative	Roderick Allen	278	11.1	+2.2
Green	Peter Polycarpou	164	6.6	−3.3
Majority		1,418	56.7	
Turnout		2,502	32.4	−6.7
Liberal Democrats hold		Swing		

The by-election was called following the resignation of Cllr Ross Laird.

Fortis Green by-election, 11 November 2004
Party	Candidate	Votes	%	±%
Liberal Democrats	Martin Newton	1,345	57.8	+17.4
Conservative	Douglas McNeill	550	23.6	−6.8
Labour	Mark Atkinson	298	12.8	−8.8
Green	Peter Budge	136	5.8	−5.6
Majority		795	34.2	
Turnout		2,329	27.7	−11.8
Liberal Democrats hold		Swing		

The by-election was called following the resignation of Cllr Barbara Fabian.
