= Hornsey and Friern Barnet =

UK Parliament constituency (since 2024)

- Borough constituency for the House of Commons
- Interactive map of boundaries from 2024
- Location within Greater London
- County: Greater London
- Electorate: 70,565 (March 2020)
- Major settlements: Muswell Hill; Crouch End; Harringay; Hornsey; Friern Barnet

Current constituency
- Created: 2024
- Member of Parliament: Catherine West (Labour)
- Seats: One
- Created from: Hornsey and Wood Green, Tottenham & Chipping Barnet

Hornsey and Friern Barnet is a constituency of the House of Commons in the UK Parliament. Further to the completion of the 2023 review of Westminster constituencies, it was first contested at the 2024 general election.

== Boundaries ==
The constituency is composed of the following:

- The London Borough of Barnet ward of Friern Barnet.
- The London Borough of Haringey wards of Alexandra Park, Crouch End, Fortis Green, Harringay, Hornsey, Muswell Hill and Stroud Green.

It comprises the following areas:

- The majority of the abolished constituency of Hornsey and Wood Green, comprising the Borough of Haringey areas of Alexandra Park, Crouch End, Fortis Green, Hornsey, Muswell Hill and Stroud Green.
- The Borough of Haringey area of Harringay from the Tottenham constituency.
- The Borough of Barnet area of Friern Barnet from the Chipping Barnet constituency.

== Constituency profile ==
The constituency is a mostly suburban area in North London. Its residents are more educated and have a higher income than the average in both London and the United Kingdom. 72% of the residents belong to the ABC1 social grade, in contrast with 59% in London and 56% in Great Britain. The proportion of White residents (70%) is higher than the London average (54%) whereas the proportion of Christians (37%) is lower. Around 19% voted to leave in the 2016 United Kingdom European Union membership referendum which is much lower than the London average (40%). The constituency is more pro-globalism and more socially liberal than the average constituency in London, and much more than the average constituency in the United Kingdom.

== Elections ==
=== Elections in the 2020s ===
General election 2024: Hornsey and Friern Barnet
Party	Candidate	Votes	%	±%
Labour	Catherine West	28,535	58.7	+1.4
Green	Fabio Vollono	7,060	14.5	+10.7
Liberal Democrats	Dawn Barnes	6,099	12.5	−13.1
Conservative	Naz Panju	4,011	8.2	−3.6
Reform	Navdeep Singh	1,989	4.1	+3.2
Workers Party	Dino Philippos	766	1.6	N/A
CPA	Helen Spiby-Vann	182	0.4	N/A
Majority		21,475	44.2	+12.6
Turnout		48,642	69.6	−4.8
Registered electors		69,885		
Labour hold		Swing	−4.7	

=== Elections in the 2010s ===
2019 notional result
Party	Vote	
Labour	30,077	57.3
Liberal Democrats	13,470	25.6
Conservative	6,200	11.8
Green	1,983	3.8
Brexit Party	494	0.9
Others	311	0.6
Turnout	52,535	74.4
Electorate	70,565	
