= Bounds Green (ward) =

Electoral ward in London, England

- Electoral ward for the Haringey London Borough Council
- Borough: Haringey
- County: Greater London
- Population: 9,833 (2021)
- Major settlements: Bounds Green
- Area: 1.124 km²

Current electoral ward
- Created: 2002
- Number of members: 2 (since 2022); 3 (2002-2022)
- Councillors: Emily Arkell; Andrea Hodgson

Bounds Green is an electoral ward in the London Borough of Haringey. The ward was first used in the 2002 elections and elects two councillors to Haringey London Borough Council.

== Geography ==
The ward is named after the area of Bounds Green.

== Councillors ==
Election	Councillor	Councillor	Councillor
2002	Vivienne Manheim (Lab)	Thomas Davidson (Lab)	Bernard Miller (Lab)
2006	Matthew Cooke (Lab)	Ali Demirci (Lib Dem)	John Oakes (Lib Dem)
2010	Matthew Cooke (Lab)	Joanna Christophides (Lab)	Ali Demirci (Lab)
2014	Clare Bull (Lab)	Joanna Christophides (Lab)	Ali Demirci (Lab)
2018	Pat Berryman (Lab)	Yvonne Say (Lab)	James Chiriyankandath (Lab)

Following the 2022 revision of ward boundaries, the ward elects 2 councillors.

Election	Councillor	Councillor
2022	Emily Arkell (Lab)	Mary Mason (Lab)
2026	Emily Arkell (Lab)	Andrea Hodgson (Lab)

== Elections ==
=== 2022 ===
Bounds Green (2)
Party	Candidate	Votes	%	±%
Labour	Emily Arkell	1,510	58.7	
Labour	Mary Mason	1,362	53.0	
Liberal Democrats	Justin Hinchcliffe*	634	24.7	
Liberal Democrats	Ibrahim Hassan	589	22.9	
Green	Steven Maddocks	419	16.3	
Conservative	Guy Carter	199	7.7	
Conservative	Suraj Bhanot	187	7.3	
Turnout		2,572	37.41	
Labour win (new boundaries)				
Labour win (new boundaries)				

=== 2026 ===
Bounds Green (2)
Party	Candidate	Votes	%	±%
Labour	Emily Arkell	1,212	38.0	−20.7
Labour	Andrea Hodgson	994	31.1	−21.9
Liberal Democrats	Dan Jones	965	30.2	+5.5
Green	Emily Carr	865	27.1	+10.8
Liberal Democrats	Asli Nicolaou	781	24.5	+1.6
Green	Phil Sheridan	701	22.0	N/A
Conservative	Adam Rynhold	219	6.9	−0.8
Reform	John Attree	218	6.8	N/A
Conservative	Kono Kono-Ugen	196	6.1	−1.2
Turnout		3,193	47.50	+10.09
Rejected ballots		16		
Labour hold				
Labour hold				
