= St Ann's (Haringey ward) =

- Electoral ward for the Haringey London Borough Council
- St Ann's ward boundaries since 2022
- Borough: Haringey
- County: Greater London
- Population: 10,590 (2021) (Note: 2021 Census data reported for 2022 ward boundaries)
- Electorate: 6,936 (2022)
- Major settlements: St Ann's
- Area: 0.7116 square kilometres (0.2748 sq mi)

Current electoral ward
- Created: 2002
- Number of members: 2002–2022: 3; 2022–present: 2
- Councillors: Ruairidh Paton; Georgia Twigg
- GSS code: E05000277 (2002–2022); E05013597 (2022–present)

St Ann's is an electoral ward in the London Borough of Haringey. The ward was first used in the 2002 elections. It returns councillors to Haringey London Borough Council. There was a revision of ward boundaries in 2022 that reduced the number of councillors from three to two.

== Councillors ==
From its creation at the 2002 revision of ward boundaries until 2022, the ward elected 3 councillors.

Election	Councillor	Councillor	Councillor
2002	Azize Canver (Lab)	Brian Haley (Lab)	Robert Harriss (Lab)
2006	Nilgun Canver (Lab)	Brian Haley (Lab)	Robert Harriss (Lab)
2010	Nilgun Canver (Lab)	David Browne (Lab)	Zena Brabazon (Lab)
2014	Barbara Blake (Lab)	Peter Morton (Lab)	Ali Ozbek (Lab)
2016 by-election	Barbara Blake (Lab)	Noah Tucker (Lab)	Ali Ozbek (Lab)
2018	Julie Davies (Lab)	Noah Tucker (Lab)	Mike Hakata (Lab)

Following the 2022 revision of ward boundaries, the ward has elected 2 councillors.

Election	Councillor	Councillor
2022	Tammy Hymas (Lab)	Holly Harrison-Mullane (Lab)
2025 by-election	Ruairidh Paton (Grn)	Holly Harrison-Mullane (Lab)
2026	Ruairidh Paton (Grn)	Georgia Twigg (Grn)

== Elections ==
=== 2026 ===
St Ann's (2)
Party	Candidate	Votes	%	±%
Green	Ruaridh Paton*	1,640	58.0	+15.0
Green	Georgia Twigg	1,522	53.9	+20.2
Labour	Vanessa Heron-Hua	819	29.0	−25.5
Labour	Amit Kamal	789	27.9	−20.3
Reform	Susan Button	165	5.8	N/A
Conservative	Devi Dimitrova	148	5.2	N/A
Conservative	Claudia Matthews	145	5.1	N/A
Liberal Democrats	Marisha Ray	110	3.9	−2.8
Liberal Democrats	Gregory Hirst	107	3.8	−2.8
Turnout		2,826	42.2	+10.8
Green hold				
Green gain from Labour				

=== 2025 by-election ===
The by-election took place on 10 April 2025, following the resignation of Tammy Hymas.

2025 St Ann's by-election
Party	Candidate	Votes	%	±%
Green	Ruairidh Paton	1,059	55.4	▲17.0
Labour	Stephen Tawiah	589	30.8	▼20.6
Conservative	Calum McGillivray	83	4.3	▲4.3
Liberal Democrats	David Beacham	70	3.7	▼3.0
Reform	David Stratford	69	3.6	▲3.6
TUSC	David Kaplan	34	1.8	▲1.8
Communist League	Tony Hunt	8	0.4	▲0.4
Majority		470	24.6	N/A
Turnout		1,920	28.8	▼2.6
Green gain from Labour		Swing		

=== 2022 ===
The election took place on 5 May 2022. This was the first election under new boundaries following the 2022 revision, which reduced the number of councillors from 3 to 2.

St Ann's (2)
Party	Candidate	Votes	%	±%
Labour	Holly Harrison-Mullane	1,188	54.5	
Labour	Tammy Hymas	1,050	48.2	
Green	Emma Chan	938	43.0	
Green	Harry Chrispin	735	33.7	
Liberal Democrats	Paul Dennison	147	6.7	
Liberal Democrats	Cara Jenkinson	143	6.6	
Turnout		2,179	31.42	
Labour win (new boundaries)				
Labour win (new boundaries)				

St Ann's ward boundaries from 2002 to 2022

=== 2018 ===
The election took place on 3 May 2018.

St Ann's (3)
Party	Candidate	Votes	%	±%
Labour	Julie Davies	2,042	63.5	+5.0
Labour	Mike Hakata	1,756	54.6	+6.4
Labour	Noah Tucker	1,752	54.5	+6.8
Green	Ann Clark	924	28.7	+4.5
Green	Jarelle Francis	801	24.9	+8.0
Green	Lee Jerome	704	21.9	+6.0
Conservative	Catherine Gamry	230	7.2	−0.8
Liberal Democrats	Mark Alexander	207	6.4	−1.4
Liberal Democrats	Sara Beynon	203	6.3	−0.6
Conservative	Daniel Gamry	203	6.3	+0.1
Conservative	Caesar Lalobo	164	5.1	−0.5
Liberal Democrats	Adrian Woodhead	138	4.3	−2.4
Independent	Andrew Reid	120	3.7	−3.8
Turnout		3,226	34.59	+2.09
Labour hold		Swing		
Labour hold		Swing		
Labour hold		Swing		

=== 2016 by-election ===
The by-election took place on 6 October 2016, following the resignation of Peter Morton.

2016 St Ann's by-election
Party	Candidate	Votes	%	±%
Labour	Noah Tucker	1,117	62.4	+14.2
Green	Ronald Stewart	323	18.1	−6.1
Liberal Democrats	Josh Dixon	189	10.6	+2.8
Conservative	Ellis Turrell	106	5.9	−2.1
UKIP	Janus Polenceusz	54	3.0	−3.8
Majority		794	44.3	
Turnout			20.67	−11.83
Labour hold		Swing		

=== 2014 ===
The election took place on 22 May 2014.

St Ann's (3)
Party	Candidate	Votes	%	±%
Labour	Barbara Blake	1,829	58.5	+7.0
Labour	Peter Morton	1,508	48.2	−0.1
Labour	Ali Ozbek	1,491	47.7	+0.9
Green	Emily Darko	757	24.2	+15.2
Green	Matthew Pollitt	530	16.9	+8.0
Green	Zeynep Kacmaz	497	15.9	+8.2
TUSC	Simon Hester	271	8.7	+4.5
Conservative	Scott Green	251	8.0	−4.5
Liberal Democrats	Alison Prager	243	7.8	−17.3
TUSC	Andrew Reid	236	7.5	N/A
Liberal Democrats	Mihai Ghertan	217	6.9	−16.7
UKIP	Peter Nichols	212	6.8	N/A
Liberal Democrats	Tola Ariyo	210	6.7	−16.0
Conservative	Melinda Koller	194	6.2	−6.2
Conservative	Nathan Parsad	175	5.6	−6.0
Turnout		3,147	32.50	−19.6
Labour hold		Swing		
Labour hold		Swing		
Labour hold		Swing		

=== 2010 ===
The election on 6 May 2010 took place on the same day as the United Kingdom general election.

St Ann’s (3)
Party	Candidate	Votes	%	±%
Labour	David Browne	2,469	51.5	+5.0
Labour	Nilgun Canver	2,315	48.3	+2.2
Labour	Zena Brabazon	2,241	46.8	+5.4
Liberal Democrats	Mark Alexander	1,201	25.1	+9.9
Liberal Democrats	Neville Collins	1,129	23.6	+10.1
Liberal Democrats	Brian Haley	1,088	22.7	−23.8
Conservative	Phivos Joannides	601	12.5	−0.3
Conservative	Joyce Oyeyi-Effiong	596	12.4	−0.7
Conservative	Sam Rozati	558	11.6	+0.6
Green	Dennis Bury	432	9.0	−10.5
Green	Ryan Taylor	427	8.9	N/A
Green	Desmond Gilmartin	371	7.7	N/A
TUSC	Simon Hester	202	4.2	−18.3
Turnout		4,823	52.1	+20.8
Labour hold		Swing		
Labour hold		Swing		
Labour hold		Swing		

=== 2006 ===
The election took place on 4 May 2006.

St Ann's (3)
Party	Candidate	Votes	%	±%
Labour	Brian Haley	1,195	46.5	−6.7
Labour	Nilgun Canver	1,184	46.1	−8.7
Labour	Robert Harriss	1,064	41.4	−10.1
Respect	Simon Hester	579	22.5	+4.9
Green	Adam Boardman	500	19.5	−0.5
Respect	Tekin Kartal	468	18.2	N/A
Liberal Democrats	Alexander Sweet	390	15.2	+0.4
Liberal Democrats	Sakina Rizvi	348	13.5	−0.4
Conservative	Aeronwy Harris	337	13.1	+1.0
Conservative	Phivous Joannides	329	12.8	+1.2
Liberal Democrats	Michael Willett	285	11.1	−2.4
Conservative	Peter Sartori	283	11.0	+1.4
Turnout		2,578	31.3	+7.8
Labour hold		Swing		
Labour hold		Swing		
Labour hold		Swing		

=== 2002 ===
The election took place on 2 May 2002.

St Ann's (3)
Party	Candidate	Votes	%	±%
Labour	Azize Canver	1,010	54.8	
Labour	Brian Haley	981	53.2	
Labour	Robert Harriss	950	51.5	
Green	Ursula Bury	368	20.0	
Socialist Alliance	Simon Hester	324	17.6	
Liberal Democrats	Caroline Shepherd	273	14.8	
Liberal Democrats	Timothy Nichols	257	13.9	
Liberal Democrats	Frank Heller	248	13.5	
Conservative	Haralambos Stavrou	223	12.1	
Conservative	Emma Varley	213	11.6	
Conservative	Calistra Toussaint	177	9.6	
Turnout		1,845	23.5	
Labour win (new seat)				
Labour win (new seat)				
Labour win (new seat)				
