= Tottenham Hale (ward) =

- Electoral ward for the Haringey London Borough Council
- Tottenham Hale ward boundaries since 2022
- Borough: Haringey
- County: Greater London
- Population: 12,176 (2021) (Note: 2021 Census data reported for 2022 ward boundaries)
- Electorate: 6,907 (2022)
- Major settlements: Harringay
- Area: 1.175 square kilometres (0.454 sq mi)

Current electoral ward
- Created: 2002
- Number of members: 3
- Councillors: Tehseen Khan; Hannah Ward; Nelly Tackie
- GSS code: E05013602

Tottenham Hale is an electoral ward in the London Borough of Haringey. The ward was first used in the 2002 elections. It returns three councillors to Haringey London Borough Council, England.

== Councillors ==
Election	Councillor	Councillor	Councillor
2002	Peter Hillman (Lab)	Alan Stanton (Lab)	David Prendergast (Lab)
2003 by-election	Peter Hillman (Lab)	Alan Stanton (Lab)	Lorna Reith (Lab)
2006	Sheik Thompson (Lab)	Alan Stanton (Lab)	Lorna Reith (Lab)
2010	Reg Rice (Lab)	Alan Stanton (Lab)	Lorna Reith (Lab)
2014	Reg Rice (Lab)	Vincent Carroll (Lab)	Lorna Reith (Lab)
2018	Reg Rice (Lab)	Vincent Carroll (Lab)	Ruth Gordon (Lab)
2022	Reg Rice (Lab)	Yannis Gourtsoyannis (Lab)	Ruth Gordon (Lab)
2023 by-election	Reg Rice (Lab)	Sean O'Donovan (Lab)	Ruth Gordon (Lab)
2026	Tehseen Khan (Grn)	Hannah Ward (Grn)	Nelly Tackie (Grn)

== Elections ==
=== 2026 ===
Tottenham Hale (3)
Party	Candidate	Votes	%	±%
Green	Tehseen Khan	1,619	50.5	+33.5
Green	Hannah Ward	1,551	48.4	+33.4
Green	Nelly Tackie	1,499	46.8	N/A
Labour	Sarah Carson	1,116	34.8	−39.7
Labour	Ruth Gordon	1,089	34.0	−30.3
Labour	Stephen Tawiah	934	29.2	−34.9
Conservative	Maria Joseph	200	6.2	−2.9
Reform	Tracy Wackett	188	5.9	N/A
Conservative	Elizabeth Williams	174	5.4	−3.2
Liberal Democrats	Daniel Kinnear	172	5.4	−3.3
Conservative	Tamouy Black	168	5.2	−2.3
Liberal Democrats	Julie Whittaker	140	4.4	−3.8
Liberal Democrats	Gavin Rosenthal	136	4.2	−2.5
Turnout		3,204	37.3	+10.1
Green gain from Labour				
Green gain from Labour				
Green gain from Labour				

=== 2023 by-election ===
The by-election took place on 9 March 2023, following the resignation of Yannis Gourtsoyannis.

2023 Tottenham Hale by-election
Party	Candidate	Votes	%	±%
Labour	Sean O'Donovan	818	58.7	▼5.4
Liberal Democrats	Allen Windsor	203	14.6	▲5.9
Green	Emma Chan	192	13.8	▼3.2
Conservative	Angelos Tsangarides	81	5.8	▼3.3
Independent	Miraf Ghebreawariat	64	4.6	New
CPA	Amelia Allao	35	2.5	New
Turnout		1,400	20	▼7.15
Labour hold		Swing	▼9.6	

=== 2022 election ===
The election took place on 5 May 2022, under new boundaries.

Tottenham Hale (3)
Party	Candidate	Votes	%	±%
Labour	Ruth Gordon	1,396	74.5	
Labour	Reg Rice	1,206	64.3	
Labour	Yannis Gourtsoyannis	1,201	64.1	
Green	Paddy Ellen	319	17.0	
Green	Adam Clarke	281	15.0	
Conservative	Georgios Dristas	170	9.1	
Liberal Democrats	Isabella Gavazzi	163	8.7	
Conservative	Peter Gorski	161	8.6	
Liberal Democrats	Jean-Philippe Chenot	154	8.2	
Conservative	Jay Simoes	141	7.5	
Liberal Democrats	Andrew Thomas	126	6.7	
Turnout		1,875	27.15	
Labour win (new boundaries)				
Labour win (new boundaries)				
Labour win (new boundaries)				
