= Stroud Green (ward) =

Electoral ward in London, England

- Electoral ward for the Haringey London Borough Council
- Borough: Haringey
- County: Greater London
- Population: 10,792 (2021)
- Major settlements: Stroud Green
- Area: 1.074 km²

Current electoral ward
- Created: 2002
- Number of members: 3
- Councillors: Beth Anderson; Gio Iozzi; Eddy Thacker

Stroud Green is an electoral ward in the London Borough of Haringey. The ward was first used in the 2002 elections and elects three councillors to Haringey London Borough Council.

== Geography ==
The ward is named after the suburb of Stroud Green.

== Councillors ==
Election	Councillor	Councillor	Councillor
2002	Josephine Irwin (Lab)	Katherine Wynne (Lab)	Andrew Krokou (Lab)
2004 by-election	Laura Edge (Lib Dem)	Katherine Wynne (Lab)	Andrew Krokou (Lab)
2006	Laura Edge (Lib Dem)	Edmund Butcher (Lib Dem)	Richard Wilson (Lib Dem)
2010	Katherine Reece (Lib Dem)	Edmund Butcher (Lib Dem)	Richard Wilson (Lib Dem)
2014	Kirsten Hearn (Lab)	Timothy Gallagher (Lab)	Raj Sahota (Lab)
2018	Kirsten Hearn (Lab)	Eldridge Culverwell (Lab)	Daniel Stone (Lab)
2022	Alexandra Worrell (Lab)	Eldridge Culverwell (Lab)	George Dunstall (Lab)
2026	Beth Anderson (Grn)	Gio Iozzi (Grn)	Eddy Thacker (Grn)

== Elections ==
=== 2026 ===
Stroud Green (3)
Party	Candidate	Votes	%	±%
Green	Beth Anderson	2,131	44.8	+18.4
Green	Gio Iozzi	1,824	38.4	N/A
Green	Eddy Thacker	1,796	37.8	N/A
Liberal Democrats	Liz Whitlock	1,342	28.2	−5.9
Labour	George Dunstall*	1,265	26.6	−21.2
Liberal Democrats	Nicholas Orford-Williams	1,205	25.4	−5.1
Liberal Democrats	David Vigoureux	1,172	24.7	−4.6
Labour	Navdeep Kaur	1,130	23.8	−32.0
Labour	James Hand	1,119	23.5	−28.8
Conservative	David Douglas	155	3.3	+0.2
Conservative	Daphne Forrest	150	3.2	−0.3
Reform	Mark Gurney	150	3.2	N/A
Conservative	Peter Forrest	146	3.1	N/A
Reform	Valerie Henderson	136	2.9	N/A
Reform	Ciprian Mihele	121	2.5	N/A
TUSC	Nick Auvache	58	1.2	N/A
CPA	Helen Spiby-Vann	31	0.7	−0.8
CPA	Amelia Allao	30	0.6	−0.7
Turnout		4,752	55.3	+11.4
Green gain from Independent				
Green gain from Labour				
Green gain from Labour				

=== 2022 ===
Stroud Green (3)
Party	Candidate	Votes	%	±%
Labour	Alexandra Worrell	2,132	55.8	
Labour	Eldridge Culverwell*	2,000	52.3	
Labour	George Dunstall	1,827	47.8	
Liberal Democrats	Joanna Kerr	1,303	34.1	
Liberal Democrats	Tom Hemsley	1,166	30.5	
Liberal Democrats	David Beacham	1,121	29.3	
Green	Cedd Burge	1,009	26.4	
Conservative	Daphne Forrest	135	3.5	
Conservative	Loretta Mitchell-Mahmud	119	3.1	
CPA	Helen Spiby-Vann	59	1.5	
CPA	Amelia Allao	51	1.3	
Turnout		3,824	43.91	
Labour win (new boundaries)				
Labour win (new boundaries)				
Labour win (new boundaries)				
