= Alexandra Park (Haringey ward) =

Electoral ward in the London Borough of Haringey

- Electoral ward for the Haringey London Borough Council
- Alexandra Park ward boundaries
- Borough: Haringey
- County: Greater London
- Population: 8,839 (2021) (Note: 2021 Census data reported for 2022 ward boundaries)
- Electorate: 6,496 (2022)
- Area: 2.351 square kilometres (0.908 sq mi)

Current electoral ward
- Created: 2022
- Number of members: 2
- Councillors: AJ Egemonye; Melanie Gingell
- Created from: Alexandra, Hornsey, Muswell Hill
- GSS code: E05013585

Alexandra Park is an electoral ward in the London Borough of Haringey. The ward was first used in the 2022 elections. It returns two councillors to Haringey London Borough Council.

== Councillors ==
Election	Councillor	Councillor
2022	Sarah Elliott (Lab)	Alessandra Rossetti (Lib Dem)
2026	Ajaegbo Egemonye (Lab)	Melanie Gingell (Lab)

== Elections ==
=== 2022 election ===
The election took place on 5 May 2022.

2022 Haringey London Borough Council election: Alexandra Park
Party	Candidate	Votes	%	±%
Labour	Sarah Elliott	1,475	44.8	
Liberal Democrats	Alessandra Rossetti	1,471	44.7	
Labour	George Danker	1,353	41.1	
Liberal Democrats	Hari Prabu	1,246	37.8	
Green	Claire Lewis	562	17.1	
Conservative	David Douglas	215	6.5	
Turnout		3,293	50.69	
Labour win (new seat)				
Liberal Democrats win (new seat)				

=== 2026 election ===
The election took place on 7 May 2026.

2026 Haringey London Borough Council election: Alexandra Park
Party	Candidate	Votes	%	±%
Labour	Melanie Gingell	1,161	29.4	−15.4
Labour	AJ Egemonye	1,144	28.9	−12.2
Liberal Democrats	Paul Dennison	1,043	26.4	−18.3
Liberal Democrats	Shelley Salter	956	24.2	−13.6
Green	Michael Anderson	877	22.2	+5.1
Green	Brij Sharma	803	20.3	N/A
Independent	Yulia Bakman	704	17.8	N/A
Independent	Helen Gerolaki	669	16.9	N/A
Reform	Will Lewis	150	3.8	N/A
Conservative	Guy Carter	142	3.6	−2.9
Conservative	Xander Phillips	110	2.8	N/A
Turnout		3,952	60.4	+9.7
Labour hold				
Labour gain from Liberal Democrats				
