= White Hart Lane (disambiguation) =

White Hart Lane is the name of a former stadium used by Tottenham Hotspur F.C.

White Hart Lane may also refer to:

- White Hart Lane railway station
- White Hart Lane (ward), a council ward in Haringey
- White Hart Lane, a road in Tottenham
- White Hart Lane Community Sports Centre
- White Hart Lane Secondary School, a school in Wood Green, renamed Woodside High School
- White Hart Lane Estate, a housing estate in Tottenham, renamed Tower Gardens Estate
- Tottenham Hotspur Stadium, the new stadium referred to as the New White Hart Lane by some fans
