= 2022 Haringey London Borough Council election =

2022 local election in Haringey

2022 Haringey Council election
- 5 May 2022

All 57 council seats
- Turnout: 31.76%
	First party	Second party
Leader	Peray Ahmet	Luke Cawley-Harrison
Party	Labour	Liberal Democrats
Last election	42 seats, 57.3%	15 seats, 23.9%
Seats won	50	7
Seat change	▲8	▼8
Percentage	59.9	24.0
Swing	2.6	0.1
- Map of the results of the 2022 Haringey London Borough Council election. Labour in red, Liberal Democrats in yellow.
council control before election
Labour
Subsequent council control
Labour

The 2022 Haringey London Borough Council election took place on 5 May 2022. All 57 members of Haringey London Borough Council were elected. The elections took place alongside local elections in the other London boroughs and elections to local authorities across the United Kingdom.

In the previous election in 2018, the Labour Party maintained its longstanding control of the council, winning 42 out of the 57 seats with the Liberal Democrats forming the council opposition with the remaining 15 seats. The 2022 election took place under new election boundaries, which retain the same number of councillors.

== Background ==
=== History ===
Result of the 2018 borough election

The thirty-two London boroughs were established in 1965 by the London Government Act 1963. They are the principal authorities in Greater London and have responsibilities including education, housing, planning, highways, social services, libraries, recreation, waste, environmental health and revenue collection. Some powers are shared with the Greater London Authority, which also manages passenger transport, police, and fire.

Since its formation, Haringey has been continuously under Labour control, apart from a period of Conservative control from 1968 to 1971. Apart from a few councillors from minor parties, all councillors elected to the council have been Labour, Conservative or Liberal Democrat. Since 2002, only Labour and Liberal Democrat councillors have been elected. In the most recent council election in 2018, Labour won 42 seats with 57.3% of the vote and the Liberal Democrats won 15 seats with 23.9% of the vote. The Green Party received 10.4% of the vote and the Conservatives won 7.8% of the vote, though neither party won any seats. The incumbent leader of the council is the Labour councillor Peray Ahmet, who has held that role since 2021.

=== Council term ===
After the 2018 election, Labour councillors elected Cllr Joseph Ejiofor, the incumbent deputy leader of the council and an elected Executive member in the party's Momentum grouping, to be the new council leader. Local party members had voted to endorse a different councillor, Zena Brabazon, to have been the council leader. Peray Ahmet, a former cabinet member Ejiofor had sacked in 2018, became council leader in May 2021 after challenging Ejiofor and winning by 1 vote.

Ejiofor was blocked by the Labour Party from standing as a candidate in 2022 after the Local Government Ombudsman released a report criticising a council decision not to purchase a house for more than three times its value as part of plans for a development around the site of the former Cranwood nursing home. Ejiofor criticised the Labour Party decision to ban him as "a Kafkaesque process resulting in an unjust ruling" and the LGO's decision as in itself "flawed, because the decision taken was legal and in line with the Council's constitution and would be the same whenever it was reviewed".

Ahmet acceded to the opposition Liberal Democrats' request for an inquiry into how property transactions have been handled by the council, including the Cranwood development.

In October 2018, the Labour councillor Ishmael Osamor, son of the Labour MP Kate Osamor, resigned after pleading guilty to possessing drugs with intent to supply and drug possession. A by-election for his West Green seat was held on 13 December 2018, which was won by the Labour candidate Seema Chandwani.

In spring 2019, Cllr Barbara Blake was expelled from the Labour Party following a complaint that she had supported candidates opposing the Labour Party. The following year, five more Labour councillors: Patrick Berryman, Dana Carlin, Vincent Carroll, Preston Tabois and Noah Tucker, were suspended from the Labour Party Group following complaints being made against them. Carlin was re-instated almost immediately pending a hearing, and Noah Tucker and Preston Tabois were readmitted in 2021, though Tucker was suspended again days later, "based on new material [the Labour Party] was not previously aware of". Carroll was restored to the party just before the AGM in 2021. The Labour councillor James Chiriyankandath left his party in June 2021 after Ahmet's election as council leader.

Like most other London borough councils, Haringey elected councillors under new ward boundaries. The Local Government Boundary Commission for England produced new wards after a period of consultation. The number of councillors remained the same at 57, representing fifteen three-councillor wards and six two-councillor wards.

== Electoral process ==
Haringey, like other London borough councils, elects all of its councillors at once every four years. The previous election took place in 2018. The election took place by multi-member first-past-the-post voting, with each ward being represented by two or three councillors. Electors had as many votes as there are councillors to be elected in their ward, with the top two or three being elected.

All registered electors (British, Irish, Commonwealth and European Union citizens) living in London aged 18 or over were entitled to vote in the election. People who lived at two addresses in different councils, such as university students with different term-time and holiday addresses, were entitled to be registered for and vote in elections in both local authorities. Voting in-person at polling stations took place from 7:00 to 22:00 on election day, and voters were able to apply for postal votes or proxy votes in advance of the election.

== Campaign ==
Labour said they would "deliver some of London's most ambitious Low Traffic Neighbourhoods and borough-wide cycling routes", as well as hundreds more electric vehicle charging points and build three thousand council homes. The Liberal Democrats said they would plant trees and oppose the construction of an incinerator and cancel plans to refurbish council offices. The Conservatives said they would address violence in the borough by "confronting uncomfortable cultural issues" and committing to "more effective policing of low-level crime". They also said they would build more electric vehicle charging points and "clean up the rubbish on our streets".

Charles Wright in OnLondon reported that more Labour candidates had been selected who would support the leader Peray Ahmet in "setbacks for Momentum". Ahmet's deputy leader Mike Hakata was deselected, but was able to become a candidate in a neighbouring Labour ward. The rabbi David Mason though selected for Crouch End ward, failed to get elected. One longstanding councillor, Mark Blake, was not reselected in his ward but stood in the Liberal Democrat-held ward of Fortis Green instead and won; while another, Gideon Bull, who was not allowed to stand as a Labour candidate, stood as an independent candidate instead in his previous ward and lost.

== Previous council composition ==
Council composition after the 2018 election

After 2018 election		Before 2022 election		After 2022 election	
Party	Seats	Party	Seats	Party	Seats
Labour	42	Labour	39	Labour	50
Liberal Democrats	15	Liberal Democrats	15	Liberal Democrats	7
Independent	0	Independent	3	Independent	0

== Results ==
Haringey Council election result 2022
Party	Seats	Gains	Losses	Net gain/loss	Seats %	Votes %	Votes	+/−
Labour	50	6	0	+8	87.7	59.9	98,393	+2.6
Liberal Democrats	7	0	6	-8	12.3	24.0	39,515	+0.1
Green	0	-	-	-	0	8.6	14,172	-1.8
Conservative	0	-	-	-	0	6.9	11,300	-0.9
Independent	0	-	-	-	0	0.4	630	+0.3
Women's Equality	0	-	-	-	0	0.2	382	New
CPA	0	-	-	-	0	0.0	67	±0.0

== Ward results ==
=== Alexandra Park ===
Alexandra Park (2)
Party	Candidate	Votes	%	±%
Labour	Sarah Elliott	1,475	44.8	
Liberal Democrats	Alessandra Rossetti*	1,471	44.7	
Labour	George Danker	1,353	41.1	
Liberal Democrats	Hari Prabu	1,246	37.8	
Green	Claire Lewis	562	17.1	
Conservative	David Douglas	215	6.5	
Turnout		3,293	50.69	
Labour win (new seat)				
Liberal Democrats win (new seat)				

Alessandra Rossetti was a sitting councillor for Alexandra ward

=== Bounds Green ===
Bounds Green (2)
Party	Candidate	Votes	%	±%
Labour	Emily Arkell	1,510	58.7	
Labour	Mary Mason	1,362	53.0	
Liberal Democrats	Justin Hinchcliffe*	634	24.7	
Liberal Democrats	Ibrahim Hassan	589	22.9	
Green	Steven Maddocks	419	16.3	
Conservative	Guy Carter	199	7.7	
Conservative	Suraj Bhanot	187	7.3	
Turnout		2,572	37.41	
Labour win (new boundaries)				
Labour win (new boundaries)				

Justin Hinchcliffe was a sitting councillor for Fortis Green ward

=== Bruce Castle ===
Bruce Castle (3)
Party	Candidate	Votes	%	±%
Labour	Ibrahim Ali	1,621	71.4	
Labour	Erdal Dogan*	1,574	69.3	
Labour	Sue Jameson	1,574	69.3	
Green	Pamela Harling	372	16.4	
Conservative	James Barton	268	11.8	
Conservative	Agnieszka Bielecka	221	9.7	
Conservative	Niveda Moorthy	205	9.0	
Liberal Democrats	Alison Prager	164	7.2	
Liberal Democrats	Alex Sweet	137	6.0	
Liberal Democrats	Matthew Taylor	132	5.8	
Turnout		2,271	25.43	
Labour win (new seat)				
Labour win (new seat)				
Labour win (new seat)				

Erdal Dogan was a sitting councillor for Seven Sisters ward

=== Crouch End ===
Crouch End (3)
Party	Candidate	Votes	%	±%
Labour	Cressida Johnson	2,278	49.7	
Labour	Lester Buxton	1,960	42.7	
Liberal Democrats	Luke Cawley-Harrison*	1,942	42.3	
Labour	David Mason	1,911	41.7	
Liberal Democrats	Elizabeth Payne	1,871	40.8	
Liberal Democrats	Josh Dixon*	1,690	36.8	
Green	Paul Wilkinson	1,095	23.9	
Conservative	David Ritchie	264	5.8	
Turnout		4,588	45.08	
Labour win (new boundaries)				
Labour win (new boundaries)				
Liberal Democrats win (new boundaries)				

Luke Cawley-Harrison was a sitting councillor for Crouch End ward

Josh Dixon was a sitting councillor for Alexandra ward

=== Fortis Green ===
Fortis Green (3)
Party	Candidate	Votes	%	±%
Liberal Democrats	Dawn Barnes*	1,979	47.1	
Labour	Joy Wallace	1,823	43.4	
Labour	Mark Blake*	1,743	41.5	
Liberal Democrats	Matthew Bentham	1,705	40.6	
Liberal Democrats	Viv Ross*	1,664	39.6	
Labour	Sean O'Donovan	1,652	39.3	
Green	Colin Ettinger	865	20.6	
Conservative	Elliot Hammer	311	7.4	
Conservative	Julian Sherwood	305	7.3	
Turnout		4,202	45.41	
Liberal Democrats win (new boundaries)				
Labour win (new boundaries)				
Labour win (new boundaries)				

Dawn Barnes was a sitting councillor for Crouch End ward

Mark Blake was a sitting councillor for Woodside ward

Viv Ross was a sitting councillor for Fortis Green ward

=== Harringay ===
Harringay (3)
Party	Candidate	Votes	%	±%
Labour	Anna Abela	1,941	52.9	
Labour	Gina Adamou*	1,832	49.9	
Labour	Zena Brabazon*	1,829	49.8	
Liberal Democrats	Karen Alexander	1,210	33.0	
Liberal Democrats	David Schmitz	1,055	28.7	
Liberal Democrats	Ryan Mercer	948	25.8	
Green	Adam Frantzis	874	23.8	
Women's Equality	Sarah Mills	382	10.4	
Conservative	William Hull	176	4.8	
Conservative	Nihat Donmez	167	4.5	
Conservative	Jethro Rasmussen	146	4.0	
Turnout		3,672	37.22	
Labour win (new boundaries)				
Labour win (new boundaries)				
Labour win (new boundaries)				

Gina Adamou and Zena Brabazon were sitting councillors for Harringay ward

=== Hermitage & Gardens ===
Hermitage & Gardens (2)
Party	Candidate	Votes	%	±%
Labour	Julie Davies*	1,318	67.2	
Labour	Mike Hakata*	1,187	60.6	
Green	Anne Clark	493	25.2	
Green	Alfred Jahn	252	12.9	
Liberal Democrats	Mark Alexander	145	7.4	
Liberal Democrats	Katherine Hamilton	145	7.4	
Conservative	Claudia Matthews	129	6.6	
Conservative	Catherine El-Gamry	127	6.5	
Turnout		1,960	30.02	
Labour win (new seat)				
Labour win (new seat)				

Julie Davies and Mike Hakata were sitting councillors for St Ann's ward

=== Highgate ===
Highgate (3)
Party	Candidate	Votes	%	±%
Liberal Democrats	Nick da Costa*	1,840	46.5	
Liberal Democrats	Marsha Isilar-Gosling	1,702	43.0	
Liberal Democrats	Scott Emery*	1,641	41.5	
Labour	Maria Jennings	1,560	39.4	
Labour	Ahmed Mohammed	1,249	31.6	
Labour	Mark Grosskopf	1,223	30.9	
Green	Ian Dick	930	23.5	
Conservative	William MacDougall	527	13.3	
Conservative	Nathan Steinberg	480	12.1	
Turnout		3,958	40.06	
Liberal Democrats win (new boundaries)				
Liberal Democrats win (new boundaries)				
Liberal Democrats win (new boundaries)				

Nick da Costa was a sitting councillor for Alexandra ward

Scott Emery was a sitting councillor for Muswell Hill ward

=== Hornsey ===
Hornsey (3)
Party	Candidate	Votes	%	±%
Labour	Adam Jogee*	2,919	65.1	
Labour	Dana Carlin*	2,789	62.2	
Labour	Elin Weston*	2,690	60.0	
Liberal Democrats	Lexi Rose	750	16.7	
Green	Mary Hogan	695	15.5	
Liberal Democrats	Jeremy Cunnington	641	14.3	
Green	Peter Budge	632	14.1	
Green	Meghana Duggirala	629	14.0	
Liberal Democrats	Matthew Kichenside	605	13.5	
Conservative	John Blandos	300	6.7	
Conservative	Peter Forrest	272	6.1	
Turnout		4,482	39.93	
Labour win (new boundaries)				
Labour win (new boundaries)				
Labour win (new boundaries)				

Dana Carlin, Adam Jogee and Elin Weston were sitting councillors for Hornsey ward

=== Muswell Hill ===
Muswell Hill (2)
Party	Candidate	Votes	%	±%
Liberal Democrats	Pippa Connor*	1,546	49.5	
Labour	Cathy Brennan	1,298	41.5	
Liberal Democrats	Brian Bogdanovich	1,294	41.4	
Labour	Sahabuddin Molla	1,027	32.9	
Green	Tom Hoyland	564	18.0	
Conservative	Xander Phillips	263	8.4	
Turnout		3,126	47.36	
Liberal Democrats win (new boundaries)				
Labour win (new boundaries)				

Pippa Connor was a sitting councillor for Muswell Hill ward

=== Noel Park ===
Noel Park (3)
Party	Candidate	Votes	%	±%
Labour	Peray Ahmet*	1,849	71.9	
Labour	Emine Ibrahim*	1,773	68.9	
Labour	Khaled Moyeed*	1,626	63.2	
Liberal Democrats	Matthew Amos	514	20.0	
Liberal Democrats	Anthony Powell	506	19.7	
Liberal Democrats	Asha Kaur	496	19.3	
Conservative	Ben Obese-Jecty	301	11.7	
Turnout		2,573	27.34	
Labour win (new boundaries)				
Labour win (new boundaries)				
Labour win (new boundaries)				

Peray Ahmet, Emine Ibrahim and Khaled Moyeed were sitting councillors for Noel Park ward

=== Northumberland Park ===
Northumberland Park (3)
Party	Candidate	Votes	%	±%
Labour	John Bevan*	1,751	73.4	
Labour	Kaushika Amin*	1,748	73.3	
Labour	Ajda Ovat	1,658	69.5	
Green	Marit Leenstra	307	12.9	
Conservative	Daniel Babis	264	11.0	
Conservative	Calum McGillivray	234	9.8	
Conservative	Mitty Ragnuth	187	7.8	
Liberal Democrats	Ron Aitken	184	7.7	
Liberal Democrats	Bob Lindsay-Smith	161	6.8	
Liberal Democrats	Valerie Mortimer	161	6.8	
Turnout		2,384	25.83	
Labour win (new boundaries)				
Labour win (new boundaries)				
Labour win (new boundaries)				

Kaushika Amin and John Bevan were sitting councillors for Northumberland Park ward

=== Seven Sisters ===
Seven Sisters (2)
Party	Candidate	Votes	%	±%
Labour	Barbara Blake*	1,272	72.9	
Labour	Michelle Simmons-Safo	1,113	63.8	
Green	Rosie Pearce	367	21.0	
Conservative	Rachel George	185	10.6	
Conservative	Stephen Noble	152	8.7	
Liberal Democrats	Lydia Hirst	123	7.1	
Liberal Democrats	Jim Jenks	69	4.0	
Turnout		1,744	28.33	
Labour win (new boundaries)				
Labour win (new boundaries)				

Barbara Blake was a sitting councillor for Seven Sisters ward

=== South Tottenham ===
South Tottenham (3)
Party	Candidate	Votes	%	±%
Labour	Sheila Peacock*	1,784	68.0	
Labour	Charles Adje*	1,769	67.4	
Labour	Makbule Gunes*	1,737	66.2	
Green	Abigail Dodd	446	17.0	
Conservative	Shloime Royde	421	16.0	
Conservative	Daniel Lake	402	15.3	
Conservative	Massimo Rossini	393	15.0	
Liberal Democrats	Paul Conyers	156	5.9	
Liberal Democrats	Joan Lindeman	148	5.6	
Liberal Democrats	Gavin Rosenthal	123	4.7	
Turnout		2,624	26.81	
Labour win (new seat)				
Labour win (new seat)				
Labour win (new seat)				

Charles Adje was a sitting councillor for White Hart Lane ward

Makbule Gunes was a sitting councillor for Tottenham Green ward

Sheila Peacock was a sitting councillor for Northumberland Park ward

=== St Ann's ===
St Ann's (2)
Party	Candidate	Votes	%	±%
Labour	Holly Harrison-Mullane	1,188	54.5	
Labour	Tammy Hymas	1,050	48.2	
Green	Emma Chan	938	43.0	
Green	Harry Chrispin	735	33.7	
Liberal Democrats	Paul Dennison*	147	6.7	
Liberal Democrats	Cara Jenkinson	143	6.6	
Turnout		2,179	31.42	
Labour win (new boundaries)				
Labour win (new boundaries)				

Paul Dennison was a sitting councillor for Highgate ward

=== Stroud Green ===
Stroud Green (3)
Party	Candidate	Votes	%	±%
Labour	Alexandra Worrell	2,132	55.8	
Labour	Eldridge Culverwell*	2,000	52.3	
Labour	George Dunstall	1,827	47.8	
Liberal Democrats	Joanna Kerr	1,303	34.1	
Liberal Democrats	Tom Hemsley	1,166	30.5	
Liberal Democrats	David Beacham	1,121	29.3	
Green	Cedd Burge	1,009	26.4	
Conservative	Daphne Forrest	135	3.5	
Conservative	Loretta Mitchell-Mahmud	119	3.1	
CPA	Helen Spiby-Vann	59	1.5	
CPA	Amelia Allao	51	1.3	
Turnout		3,824	43.91	
Labour win (new boundaries)				
Labour win (new boundaries)				
Labour win (new boundaries)				

Eldridge Culverwell was a sitting councillor for Stroud Green ward

=== Tottenham Central ===
Tottenham Central (3)
Party	Candidate	Votes	%	±%
Labour	Felicia Opoku*	2,004	72.5	
Labour	Isidoros Diakides*	1,950	70.5	
Labour	Matthew White*	1,735	62.7	
Green	Obi Obedencio	677	24.5	
Liberal Democrats	Matthew Evans	276	10.0	
Liberal Democrats	Julia Ogiehor*	263	9.5	
Conservative	Agnieszka Adrjanowicz	260	9.4	
Conservative	Charles Everett	247	8.9	
Liberal Democrats	Simon Fuchs	226	8.3	
Conservative	Queenjane Tobin	203	7.3	
Turnout		2,765	27.57	
Labour win (new seat)				
Labour win (new seat)				
Labour win (new seat)				

Felicia Opoku and Matthew White were sitting councillors for Bruce Grove ward

Isidoros Diakides was a sitting councillor for Tottenham Green ward

Julia Ogiehor was a sitting councillor for Muswell Hill ward

=== Tottenham Hale ===
Tottenham Hale (3)
Party	Candidate	Votes	%	±%
Labour	Ruth Gordon*	1,396	74.5	
Labour	Reg Rice*	1,206	64.3	
Labour	Yannis Gourtsoyannis	1,201	64.1	
Green	Paddy Ellen	319	17.0	
Green	Adam Clarke	281	15.0	
Conservative	Georgios Dristas	170	9.1	
Liberal Democrats	Isabella Gavazzi	163	8.7	
Conservative	Peter Gorski	161	8.6	
Liberal Democrats	Jean-Philippe Chenot	154	8.2	
Conservative	Jay Simoes	141	7.5	
Liberal Democrats	Andrew Thomas	126	6.7	
Turnout		1,875	27.15	
Labour win (new boundaries)				
Labour win (new boundaries)				
Labour win (new boundaries)				

Ruth Gordon and Reg Rice were sitting councillors for Tottenham Hale ward

=== West Green ===
West Green (3)
Party	Candidate	Votes	%	±%
Labour	Seema Chandwani*	2,213	74.4	
Labour	Sarah Williams*	2,201	74.0	
Labour	Nicola Bartlett	2,198	73.9	
Liberal Democrats	Kathy Riddle	404	13.6	
Liberal Democrats	Gregory Hirst	325	10.9	
Conservative	Sharon Cronin	310	10.4	
Conservative	Fatma Cin	303	10.2	
Liberal Democrats	Richard Siemicki	258	8.7	
Conservative	Caesar Lalobo	250	8.4	
Turnout		2,974	21.48	
Labour win (new boundaries)				
Labour win (new boundaries)				
Labour win (new boundaries)				

Seema Chandwani and Sarah Williams were sitting councillors for West Green ward

=== White Hart Lane ===
White Hart Lane (3)
Party	Candidate	Votes	%	±%
Labour	Yvonne Say*	1,779	62.6	
Labour	Anne Stennett*	1,723	60.7	
Labour	Ahmed Mahbub	1,712	60.3	
Independent	Gideon Bull*	630	22.2	
Conservative	Bradley Fage	374	13.2	
Conservative	Jeremy Krynicki	333	11.7	
Conservative	Neil O’Shea	329	11.6	
Liberal Democrats	Elizabeth Blackett	318	11.2	
Liberal Democrats	Paul Head	225	7.9	
Liberal Democrats	Adam Perry	214	7.5	
Turnout		2,840	29.55	
Labour win (new boundaries)				
Labour win (new boundaries)				
Labour win (new boundaries)				

Gideon Bull and Anne Stennett were sitting councillors for White Hart Lane ward

Yvonne Say was a sitting councillor for Bounds Green ward

Gideon Bull was elected in 2018 as a Labour councillor

=== Woodside ===
Woodside (3)
Party	Candidate	Votes	%	±%
Labour	Lotte Collett	2,077	67.3	
Labour	Lucia Das Neves*	2,073	67.2	
Labour	Thayahlan Iyngkaran	1,770	57.4	
Green	Jarelle Francis	711	23.0	
Liberal Democrats	Sam Fisk	454	14.7	
Liberal Democrats	Shelley Salter	440	14.3	
Liberal Democrats	Paul Negus	402	13.0	
Conservative	Eva Carr	373	12.1	
Conservative	Shanuk Mediwaka	291	9.4	
Turnout		3,085	30.33	
Labour win (new boundaries)				
Labour win (new boundaries)				
Labour win (new boundaries)				

Lucia Das Neves was a sitting councillor for Woodside ward

== By-elections ==
Tottenham Hale ward by-election, 9 March 2023
Party	Candidate	Votes	%	±%
Labour	Sean O'Donovan	818	58.7	▼5.4
Liberal Democrats	Allen Windsor	203	14.6	▲5.9
Green	Emma Chan	192	13.8	▼3.2
Conservative	Angelos Tsangarides	81	5.8	▼3.3
Independent	Miraf Ghebreawariat	64	4.6	New
CPA	Amelia Allao	35	2.5	New
Turnout		1,400	20	▼7.2
Labour hold		Swing	▼9.6	

A by-election was held on 9 March 2023 in Tottenham Hale ward following the resignation of Yannis Gourtsoyannis.

Hermitage & Gardens ward by-election, 29 June 2023
Party	Candidate	Votes	%	±%
Labour	Anna Lawton	822	59.6	▼7.6
Green	Alfred Jahn	224	16.2	▲3.3
Liberal Democrats	Paul Dennison	217	15.7	▲8.3
Conservative	Chris Brosnan	100	7.3	▲0.7
CPA	Amelia Allao	16	1.2	New
Turnout		1,391	22.92	▼7.1
Labour hold		Swing	▼	

A by-election was held on 29 June 2023 in Hermitage & Gardens ward following the death of Julie Davies.

South Tottenham ward by-election, 4 October 2023
Party	Candidate	Votes	%	±%
Labour	Mark Grosskopf	1,268	67.7	▲0.3
Conservative	Shloime Royde	286	15.3	▼0.7
Green	Jonathan McKinley	235	12.6	▼4.4
Liberal Democrats	David Schmitz	71	3.8	▼2.1
Turnout		1,872	20.23	▼6.6
Labour hold		Swing	▲3.6	

A by-election was held on 4 October 2023 in South Tottenham ward following the resignation of Charles Adje.

White Hart Lane ward by-election, 4 October 2023
Party	Candidate	Votes	%	±%
Labour	Liam Carroll	1,081	58.7	▼3.9
Conservative	James Barton	289	15.7	▲2.5
Green	Friedrich-Paul Ernst	247	13.4	New
Liberal Democrats	David Vigoureux	215	11.7	▲0.5
Turnout		1,843	19.64	▼9.9
Labour hold		Swing	▼	

A by-election was held on 4 October 2023 in South Tottenham ward following the resignation of Yvonne Say.

Hornsey ward by-election, 4 July 2024
Party	Candidate	Votes	%	±%
Labour	Adam Small	3,767	51.8	▼13.3
Green	Jo Dowbor	1,819	25.0	▲9.5
Liberal Democrats	Justin Hinchcliffe	902	12.4	▼4.3
Conservative	Ioannis Blantos	495	6.8	▲0.1
Independent	David Orford	288	4.0	New
Turnout		7,322	64.6	▲24.7
Labour hold		Swing		

A by-election was held on 4 July 2024 in Hornsey ward following the resignation of Adam Jogee, who was elected MP for Newcastle-under-Lyme.

St Ann's ward by-election, 10 April 2025
Party	Candidate	Votes	%	±%
Green	Ruairidh Paton	1,059	55.4	▲17.0
Labour	Stephen Tawiah	589	30.8	▼20.6
Conservative	Calum McGillivray	83	4.3	▲4.3
Liberal Democrats	David Beacham	70	3.7	▼3.0
Reform	David Stratford	69	3.6	▲3.6
TUSC	David Kaplan	34	1.8	▲1.8
Communist League	Tony Hunt	8	0.4	▲0.4
Majority		470	24.6	N/A
Turnout		1,920	28.8	▼2.6
Green gain from Labour		Swing	▲18.8	

A by-election was held on 10 April 2025 in St Ann's ward following the resignation of Tammy Hymas.
