= Tottenham Central (ward) =

Electoral ward in London, England

- Electoral ward for the Haringey London Borough Council
- Borough: Haringey
- County: Greater London
- Population: 14,739 (2021)
- Area: 1.042 km²

Current electoral ward
- Created: 2022
- Number of members: 3
- Councillors: Mark Blake; Dixie-Ann Joseph; Andrew Reid

Tottenham Central is an electoral ward in the London Borough of Haringey. The ward was first used in the 2022 elections and elects three councillors to Haringey London Borough Council.

== Geography ==
The ward is located in central Tottenham.

== Councillors ==
Election	Councillor	Councillor	Councillor
2022	Felicia Opoku (Lab)	Isidoros Diakides (Lab)	Matt White (Lab)
2026	Mark Blake (Grn)	Dixie-Ann Joseph (Grn)	Andrew Reid (Grn)

== Elections ==
=== 2026 ===
Tottenham Central (3)
Party	Candidate	Votes	%	±%
Green	Mark Blake	2,101	52.4	+27.9
Green	Dixie-Ann Joseph	2,052	51.2	N/A
Green	Andrew Reid	1,931	48.2	N/A
Labour Co-op	Funmi Abari	1,388	34.6	−37.9
Labour Co-op	Matt White	1,283	32.0	−38.5
Labour Co-op	Zak Ivany	1,191	29.7	−33.0
Conservative	Trevor Malcolm	269	6.7	−2.7
Liberal Democrats	Matthew Evans	252	6.3	−3.7
Reform	Joe Doyle	225	5.6	N/A
Conservative	Jeanne Mendis-Abeysekera	218	5.4	−3.5
Liberal Democrats	Yolanda Powell	200	5.0	−4.5
Conservative	Doulla Theodorou	193	4.8	−2.5
Liberal Democrats	Uladzislau Ramanenka	140	3.5	−3.8
Turnout		4,006	40.8	+13.2
Green gain from Labour				
Green gain from Labour				
Green gain from Labour				

=== 2022 ===
Tottenham Central (3)
Party	Candidate	Votes	%	±%
Labour	Felicia Opoku	2,004	72.5	
Labour	Isidoros Diakides	1,950	70.5	
Labour	Matthew White	1,735	62.7	
Green	Obi Obedencio	677	24.5	
Liberal Democrats	Matthew Evans	276	10.0	
Liberal Democrats	Julia Ogiehor	263	9.5	
Conservative	Agnieszka Adrjanowicz	260	9.4	
Conservative	Charles Everett	247	8.9	
Liberal Democrats	Simon Fuchs	226	8.3	
Conservative	Queenjane Tobin	203	7.3	
Turnout		2,765	27.57	
Labour win (new seat)				
Labour win (new seat)				
Labour win (new seat)				
