= Claire Kober =

English politician (born 1978)

Claire Kober OBE

Leader of Haringey Borough Council
- In office 10 December 2008 – 4 May 2018
- Deputy: Lorna Reith; Bernice Vanier
- Preceded by: George Meehan
- Succeeded by: Joseph Ejiofor

Labour Group Leader on Haringey Council
- In office 10 December 2008 – 4 May 2018
- Deputy: Lorna Reith; Bernice Vanier
- Preceded by: George Meehan
- Succeeded by: Joseph Ejiofor

Haringey Borough Councillor for Seven Sisters ward
- In office 4 May 2006 – 4 May 2018
- Preceded by: Richard Reynolds

Personal details
- Born: c. 1978
- Party: Labour
- Education: Keele University; University of East Anglia

Claire Kober OBE (born 1978) is a former Labour Party politician and ex-council leader of the London Borough of Haringey, North London, England. In May 2018 she stepped down as councillor and council leader.

== Early life ==
Kober spent her formative years on Canvey Island, Essex, where she attended Cornelius Vermuyden School. She initially studied German and History at Keele University, but after the first year switched to Modern History at the University of East Anglia, where she achieved BA (Hons). After graduating, Kober held positions with a number of charities, including End Child Poverty (2002–2004), Leonard Cheshire Disability (2004–2006), and Family Action (2006–2008). In May 2006, Kober was elected as a councillor for the London Borough of Haringey.

== Political career ==
Kober was selected as Labour's Council candidate for Muswell Hill in 2002 and 2004 and after two defeats she was elected to represent the Seven Sisters ward in south Tottenham on 4 May 2006.

In November 2008, having served as Labour's Chief Whip, she was elected Leader of the Council in succession to Cllr George Meehan, who resigned following the death of Baby P. On 8 June 2010, Kober was appointed by Hackney Mayor Jules Pipe as Deputy Chair of London Councils, the body which represents the interests of the 32 London Borough Councils. She was the lead spokesperson on regeneration and infrastructure.

In February 2018, ahead of the May 2018 council elections, she announced she would be stepping down as councillor and council leader, blaming "bullying" and "sexism" by supporters of Jeremy Corbyn. She had been pursuing a policy of attempting to transfer a large area of the Borough's public housing to the "HDV" (Haringey Development Vehicle), a partnership with private developers Lendlease, the Australian property speculators. However, this development, which was thought to retain insufficient safeguards for decanted tenants, had faced fierce resistance from both Labour and Liberal Democrat councillors and from local campaigners.

After stepping down as leader and councillor, she quickly obtained the role of Director of Housing at the Pinnacle Group, a private finance group. Pinnacle, which is owned by private equity group, Starwood Capital, was one of the three shortlisted bidders for the Haringey Development Vehicle.
