= Muswell Hill (ward) =

Electoral ward in London, England

- Electoral ward for the Haringey London Borough Council
- Borough: Haringey
- County: Greater London
- Population: 8,779 (2021)
- Major settlements: Muswell Hill
- Area: 1.306 km²

Current electoral ward
- Created: 1965
- Number of members: 2 (since 2022); 3 (1964-2022)
- Councillors: Carolina Braun; Tony Powell

Muswell Hill is an electoral ward in the London Borough of Haringey. The ward was first used in the 1964 elections and elects two councillors to Haringey London Borough Council.

== Geography ==
The ward is named after the suburb of Muswell Hill.

== Councillors ==
Election	Councillor	Councillor	Councillor
1964	N. Muldoon (Con)	F. C. V. Hayward (Con)	F. P. Lloyd (Con)
1968	J. M. Cooke (Con)	J. Cooper (Con)	A. Harris (Con)
1971	J. M. Cooke (Con)	J. Cooper (Con)	A. Harris (Con)
1972 by-election	R. J. Atkins (Con)	J. Cooper (Con)	A. Harris (Con)
1974	R. J. Atkins (Con)	C. D. Jackson (Con)	A. Harris (Con)
1977 by-election	Benjamin Hall (Con)	Christine Jackson (Con)	Aeronwy Harris (Con)
1978	Benjamin Hall (Con)	Christine Jackson (Con)	Aeronwy Harris (Con)
1982	Benjamin Hall (Con)	Robert Mason (Con)	Aeronwy Harris (Con)
1986	Benjamin Hall (Con)	Blair Greaves (Con)	Aeronwy Harris (Con)
1990	Benjamin Hall (Con)	Blair Greaves (Con)	Aeronwy Harris (Con)
1994	Elaine Thompson (Lab)	Charles Keal (Lab)	Craig Turton (Lab)
1998	Lynne Featherstone (Lib Dem)	June Andersen (Lib Dem)	Julia Glenn (Lib Dem)
2000 by-election	Lynne Featherstone (Lib Dem)	Ross Laird (Lib Dem)	Julia Glenn (Lib Dem)
2002	Lynne Featherstone (Lib Dem)	Ross Laird (Lib Dem)	Jonathan Bloch (Lib Dem)
2004 by-election	Lynne Featherstone (Lib Dem)	Gail Engert (Lib Dem)	Jonathan Bloch (Lib Dem)
2006	Sheila Rainger (Lib Dem)	Gail Engert (Lib Dem)	Jonathan Bloch (Lib Dem)
2010	Jim Jenks (Lib Dem)	Gail Engert (Lib Dem)	Jonathan Bloch (Lib Dem)
2014	Pippa Connor (Lib Dem)	Gail Engert (Lib Dem)	Mark Blake (Lab)
2018	Pippa Connor (Lib Dem)	Scott Emery (Lib Dem)	Julia Ogiehor (Lib Dem)

Following the 2022 revision of ward boundaries, the ward elects 2 councillors.

Election	Councillor	Councillor
2022	Pippa Connor (Lib Dem)	Cathy Brennan (Lab)
2026	Carolina Braun (Lib Dem)	Tony Powell (Lib Dem)

== Elections ==
=== 2026 ===
Muswell Hill (2)
Party	Candidate	Votes	%	±%
Liberal Democrats	Karolina Braun	1,474	40.3	−9.2
Liberal Democrats	Tony Powell	1,273	34.8	−6.6
Labour	Cathy Brennan*	1,192	32.3	−9.2
Labour	Sean O'Donovan**	925	25.3	−7.6
Green	Florence Wright	853	23.3	+5.3
Green	Josh Thomson	743	20.3	N/A
Conservative	Eva Carr	209	5.7	−2.7
Reform	Geno Esposito	191	5.2	N/A
Conservative	Ben Lloyd	189	5.2	N/A
Reform	Michael Gabbay	185	5.1	N/A
Turnout		3,658	55.7	+8.3
Liberal Democrats hold				
Liberal Democrats gain from Labour				

=== 2022 ===
Muswell Hill (2)
Party	Candidate	Votes	%	±%
Liberal Democrats	Pippa Connor*	1,546	49.5	
Labour	Cathy Brennan	1,298	41.5	
Liberal Democrats	Brian Bogdanovich	1,294	41.4	
Labour	Sahabuddin Molla	1,027	32.9	
Green	Tom Hoyland	564	18.0	
Conservative	Xander Phillips	263	8.4	
Turnout		3,126	47.36	
Liberal Democrats win (new boundaries)				
Labour win (new boundaries)				
