= Hermitage and Gardens =

Electoral ward in the London Borough of Haringey

- Electoral ward for the Haringey London Borough Council
- Hermitage and Gardens ward boundaries
- Borough: Haringey
- County: Greater London
- Population: 8,437 (2021) (Note: 2021 Census data reported for 2022 ward boundaries)
- Electorate: 6,530 (2022)
- Area: 0.8342 square kilometres (0.3221 sq mi)

Current electoral ward
- Created: 2022
- Number of members: 2
- Councillors: Ata Berk Aksit; Fin Fitzgerald
- Created from: St Ann's, Seven Sisters
- GSS code: E05013591

Hermitage and Gardens is an electoral ward in the London Borough of Haringey. The ward was first used in the 2022 elections. It returns two councillors to Haringey London Borough Council.

== Councillors ==
Election	Councillor	Councillor
2022	Julie Davies (Lab)	Mike Hakata (Lab)
2023 by-election	Anna Lawton (Lab)	Mike Hakata (Lab)
2026	Ata Berk Aksit (Grn)	Fin Fitzgerald (Grn)

== Haringey council elections ==
=== 2026 election ===
Mike Hakata resigned in January 2026, with the by-election deferred until May 2026. (Note: Casual vacancies occurring within six months of scheduled elections are not filled.)

Hermitage & Gardens (2)
Party	Candidate	Votes	%	±%
Green	Ata Berk Aksit	1,773	60.8	+35.6
Green	Fin Fitzgerald	1,676	57.5	+44.6
Labour	Millie Cartwright	853	29.3	−37.9
Labour	Edward Lewis-Smith	702	24.1	−36.5
Liberal Democrats	Ronald Aitken	144	4.9	−2.5
Liberal Democrats	Lydia Hirst	142	4.9	−2.5
Conservative	Catherine El-Gamry	127	4.4	−2.2
Reform	Susan Attridge	106	3.6	N/A
Conservative	Daniel El-Gamry	98	3.3	−3.2
TUSC	Amnon Cohen	32	1.1	N/A
Turnout		2,916	46.2	+16.2
Green gain from Labour				
Green gain from Labour				

=== 2023 by-election ===
The by-election was held on 29 June 2023, following the death of Julie Davies.

2023 Hermitage and Gardens by-election
Party	Candidate	Votes	%	±%
Labour	Anna Lawton	822	59.6	
Green	Alfred Jahn	224	16.2	
Liberal Democrats	Paul Dennison	217	15.7	
Conservative	Chris Brosnan	100	7.3	
CPA	Amelia Allao	16	1.2	
Turnout		1,391	22.92	
Labour hold		Swing		

=== 2022 election ===
The election took place on 5 May 2022.

2022 Haringey London Borough Council election: Hermitage and Gardens
Party	Candidate	Votes	%	±%
Labour	Julie Davies	1,318	67.2	
Labour	Mike Hakata	1,187	60.6	
Green	Anne Clark	493	25.2	
Green	Alfred Jahn	252	12.9	
Liberal Democrats	Mark Alexander	145	7.4	
Liberal Democrats	Katherine Hamilton	145	7.4	
Conservative	Claudia Matthews	129	6.6	
Conservative	Catherine El-Gamry	127	6.5	
Turnout		1,960	30.02	
Labour win (new seat)				
Labour win (new seat)				
