= Hornsey (ward) =

Electoral area in London

- Electoral ward for the Haringey London Borough Council
- Hornsey ward boundaries since 2022
- Borough: Haringey
- County: Greater London
- Population: 15,035 (2021) (Note: 2021 Census data reported for 2022 ward boundaries)
- Electorate: 11,225 (2022)
- Major settlements: Harringay
- Area: 1.301 square kilometres (0.502 sq mi)

Current electoral ward
- Created: 2002
- Number of members: 3
- Members: Dana Carlin; Elin Weston; Adam Small

Hornsey is an electoral ward in the London Borough of Haringey. The ward has existed since 2002 and was first used in the 2002 elections. It returns councillors to Haringey London Borough Council.

== Councillors ==
| Election | Councillor | Councillor | Councillor |
|---|---|---|---|
| 2002 | Judith Bax (Lab) | Dequincy Prescott (Lab) | Richard Milner (Lab) |
| 2006 | Errol Reid (Lib Dem) | Monica Whyte (Lib Dem) | Robert Gorrie (Lib Dem) |
| 2010 | Errol Reid (Lib Dem) | Monica Whyte (Lib Dem) | Robert Gorrie (Lib Dem) |
| 2014 | Adam Jogee (Lab) | Jennifer Mann (Lab) | Elin Weston (Lab) |
| 2018 | Adam Jogee (Lab) | Dana Carlin (Lab) | Elin Weston (Lab) |
| 2022 | Adam Jogee (Lab) | Dana Carlin (Lab) | Elin Weston (Lab) |
| 2024 by-election | Adam Small (Lab) | Dana Carlin (Lab) | Elin Weston (Lab) |
| 2026 | Adam Small (Lab) | Dana Carlin (Lab) | Elin Weston (Lab) |

== Elections ==
=== 2026 ===
The election took place on 7 May 2026.

Hornsey (3)
| Party | Candidate | Votes | % | ±% |
|---|---|---|---|---|
| Labour | Dana Carlin* | 2,282 | 40.7 | −21.5 |
| Labour | Adam Small* | 2,282 | 40.7 | −24.4 |
| Labour | Elin Weston* | 2,134 | 38.1 | −21.9 |
| Green | David Baulk | 2,095 | 37.4 | +21.9 |
| Green | Felicity De Motta | 2,027 | 36.2 | +22.1 |
| Green | Lucas Bouvier | 2,002 | 35.7 | +21.7 |
| Liberal Democrats | Gilly Kilby-Gjini | 843 | 15.0 | −1.7 |
| Liberal Democrats | Julia Ogiehor | 798 | 14.2 | −0.1 |
| Liberal Democrats | Tom Williams | 791 | 14.1 | +0.6 |
| Reform | Mark Cortacans | 290 | 5.2 | N/A |
| Conservative | Kay Carter | 285 | 5.1 | −1.6 |
| Conservative | John Carver | 260 | 4.6 | −1.5 |
| Conservative | Harry Sullivan | 229 | 4.1 | N/A |
| Turnout | | 5,602 | 50.2 | +10.3 |
| Labour hold | | | | |
| Labour hold | | | | |
| Labour hold | | | | |

=== 2024 by-election ===
The by-election on 4 July 2024 took place on the same day as the United Kingdom general election, following the resignation of Adam Jogee.

Hornsey ward by-election, 4 July 2024
| Party | Candidate | Votes | % | ±% |
|---|---|---|---|---|
| Labour | Adam Small | 3,767 | 51.8 | ▼13.3 |
| Green | Jo Dowbor | 1,819 | 25.0 | ▲9.5 |
| Liberal Democrats | Justin Hinchcliffe | 902 | 12.4 | ▼4.3 |
| Conservative | Ioannis Blantos | 495 | 6.8 | ▲0.1 |
| Independent | David Orford | 288 | 4.0 | New |
| Turnout | | 7,322 | 64.6 | ▲24.7 |
| Labour hold | | Swing | | |

=== 2022 ===
The election took place on 5 May 2022, under new boundaries.

2022 Haringey London Borough Council election: Hornsey
| Party | Candidate | Votes | % | ±% |
|---|---|---|---|---|
| Labour | Adam Jogee | 2,919 | 65.1 | |
| Labour | Dana Carlin | 2,789 | 62.2 | |
| Labour | Elin Weston | 2,690 | 60.0 | |
| Liberal Democrats | Lexi Rose | 750 | 16.7 | |
| Green | Mary Hogan | 695 | 15.5 | |
| Liberal Democrats | Jeremy Cunnington | 641 | 14.3 | |
| Green | Peter Budge | 632 | 14.1 | |
| Green | Meghana Duggirala | 629 | 14.0 | |
| Liberal Democrats | Matthew Kichenside | 605 | 13.5 | |
| Conservative | John Blandos | 300 | 6.7 | |
| Conservative | Peter Forrest | 272 | 6.1 | |
| Turnout | | 4,482 | 39.93 | |
| Labour win (new boundaries) | | | | |
| Labour win (new boundaries) | | | | |
| Labour win (new boundaries) | | | | |

=== 2018 ===
The election took place on 3 May 2018. This was the last election under the 2002-2018 boundaries for the ward.

Hornsey ward boundaries from 2002 to 2022

2018 Haringey London Borough Council election: Hornsey
| Party | Candidate | Votes | % | ±% |
|---|---|---|---|---|
| Labour | Adam Jogee | 2,451 | 61.3 | +13.7 |
| Labour | Dana Carlin | 2,447 | 61.2 | +15.5 |
| Labour | Elin Weston | 2,304 | 57.6 | +13.0 |
| Liberal Democrats | Gillian Kilby | 892 | 22.3 | −6.0 |
| Liberal Democrats | Jim Jenks | 785 | 19.6 | −11.3 |
| Liberal Democrats | Paul Secher | 687 | 17.2 | −12.2 |
| Green | Mary Bridget Hogan | 496 | 12.4 | −1.5 |
| Green | Peter Budge | 414 | 10.4 | −2.3 |
| Green | Culann Walsh | 334 | 8.4 | −2.4 |
| Conservative | Guy Thomas Carter | 284 | 7.1 | +1.1 |
| Conservative | Peter James Forrest | 265 | 6.6 | +1.7 |
| Conservative | Peter Gilbert | 250 | 6.3 | +1.8 |
| Turnout | | 4,004 | 42.88 | −1.89 |
| Labour hold | | Swing | | |
| Labour hold | | Swing | | |
| Labour hold | | Swing | | |

=== 2014 ===
The election took place on 22 May 2014.

2014 Haringey London Borough Council election: Hornsey
| Party | Candidate | Votes | % | ±% |
|---|---|---|---|---|
| Labour | Adam Jogee | 1,967 | 47.6 | +12.9 |
| Labour | Jennifer Mann | 1,887 | 45.7 | +16.1 |
| Labour | Elin Weston | 1,841 | 44.6 | +16.3 |
| Liberal Democrats | Dawn Barnes | 1,276 | 30.9 | −13.2 |
| Liberal Democrats | Errol Reid | 1,216 | 29.4 | −14.4 |
| Liberal Democrats | Gillian Kilby | 1,169 | 28.3 | −14.1 |
| Green | Mary Hogan | 576 | 13.9 | +2.2 |
| Green | Peter Budge | 525 | 12.7 | +2.1 |
| Green | Duncan Ford | 446 | 10.8 | +1.0 |
| Conservative | Aidan Crook | 248 | 6.0 | −3.5 |
| UKIP | Tom Coyle | 210 | 5.1 | +2.8 |
| Conservative | Alice Pastides | 204 | 4.9 | −4.5 |
| Conservative | Clark Vasey | 187 | 4.5 | −4.4 |
| Turnout | | 4,148 | 44.77 | −22.0 |
| Labour gain from Liberal Democrats | | Swing | | |
| Labour gain from Liberal Democrats | | Swing | | |
| Labour gain from Liberal Democrats | | Swing | | |

=== 2010 ===
The election on 6 May 2010 took place on the same day as the United Kingdom general election.

2010 Haringey London Borough Council election: Hornsey
| Party | Candidate | Votes | % | ±% |
|---|---|---|---|---|
| Liberal Democrats | Robert Gorrie | 2,609 | 44.1 | +0.2 |
| Liberal Democrats | Errol Reid | 2,589 | 43.8 | −4.6 |
| Liberal Democrats | Monica Whyte | 2,511 | 42.4 | −2.9 |
| Labour | John Blake | 2,053 | 34.7 | +2.2 |
| Labour | Eugene Akwasi-Ayisi | 1,751 | 29.6 | −2.7 |
| Labour | Makbule Gunes | 1,672 | 28.3 | −1.7 |
| Green | Mary Hogan | 693 | 11.7 | −1.9 |
| Green | Peter Budge | 628 | 10.6 | −3.8 |
| Conservative | Lionel Eddy | 562 | 9.5 | +3.5 |
| Conservative | Peter Gilbert | 554 | 9.4 | +3.8 |
| Green | Nicholas Mole | 532 | 9.0 | −2.3 |
| Conservative | Lloyda Fanusie | 526 | 8.9 | +3.6 |
| UKIP | Jeremy Ross | 136 | 2.3 | N/A |
| Turnout | | 5,947 | 66.8 | +26.9 |
| Liberal Democrats hold | | Swing | | |
| Liberal Democrats hold | | Swing | | |
| Liberal Democrats hold | | Swing | | |

=== 2006 ===
The election took place on 4 May 2006.

2006 Haringey London Borough Council election: Hornsey
| Party | Candidate | Votes | % | ±% |
|---|---|---|---|---|
| Liberal Democrats | Errol Reid | 1,530 | 48.4 | +24.1 |
| Liberal Democrats | Monica Whyte | 1,432 | 45.3 | +21.7 |
| Liberal Democrats | Robert Gorrie | 1,388 | 43.9 | +27.0 |
| Labour | Quincy Prescott | 1,028 | 32.5 | −12.1 |
| Labour | Richard Milner | 1,020 | 32.3 | −11.6 |
| Labour | Erline Prescott | 948 | 30.0 | −17.6 |
| Green | Paul Butler | 454 | 14.4 | −2.7 |
| Green | Mary Hogan | 429 | 13.6 | −3.2 |
| Green | Sarah Phillips | 356 | 11.3 | N/A |
| Conservative | Elizabeth Henderson | 191 | 6.0 | −7.2 |
| Conservative | Jennifer Grant | 176 | 5.6 | −5.9 |
| Conservative | Kay Curtis | 169 | 5.3 | −5.7 |
| Turnout | | 3,173 | 39.9 | +12.6 |
| Liberal Democrats gain from Labour | | Swing | | |
| Liberal Democrats gain from Labour | | Swing | | |
| Liberal Democrats gain from Labour | | Swing | | |

=== 2002 ===
The election took place on 2 May 2002.

2002 Haringey London Borough Council election: Hornsey
| Party | Candidate | Votes | % | ±% |
|---|---|---|---|---|
| Labour | Judith Bax | 980 | 47.6 | |
| Labour | Dequincy Prescott | 919 | 44.6 | |
| Labour | Richard Milner | 903 | 43.9 | |
| Liberal Democrats | Lindsay Northover | 500 | 24.3 | |
| Liberal Democrats | Roderick Benziger | 485 | 23.6 | |
| Green | Karine Pellaumail | 352 | 17.1 | |
| Liberal Democrats | Keith Tarn | 348 | 16.9 | |
| Green | Peter Norris | 346 | 16.8 | |
| Conservative | Sally Lumb | 272 | 13.2 | |
| Conservative | Catherine MacDougall | 236 | 11.5 | |
| Conservative | Ian Stewart | 227 | 11.0 | |
| Socialist Alliance | Geoff Palmer | 129 | 6.3 | |
| Turnout | | 2,068 | 27.3 | |
| Labour win (new seat) | | | | |
| Labour win (new seat) | | | | |
| Labour win (new seat) | | | | |
