= White Hart Lane (ward) =

Electoral ward in the London Borough of Haringey

- Electoral ward for the Haringey London Borough Council
- White Hart Lane ward boundaries since 2022
- Borough: Haringey
- County: Greater London
- Population: 13,882 (2021) (Note: 2021 Census data reported for 2022 ward boundaries)
- Electorate: 9,610 (2022)
- Area: 1.687 square kilometres (0.651 sq mi)

Current electoral ward
- Created: 1978
- Number of members: 3
- Councillors: Mike Hodges; Marie Kristensen; Beverley Berrick
- GSS code: E05000283 (2002–2022); E05013604 (2022–present)

White Hart Lane is an electoral ward in the London Borough of Haringey. The ward has existed since 1978 and was first used in the 1978 elections. It returns three councillors to Haringey London Borough Council.

The ward covers an area of 1.7 km^{2}, and is located mainly in the N17 and partly in the N22 and N13 postcodes. The ward is named after the road White Hart Lane; the road itself stretches from the junction with Tottenham High Road to the junction with Wood Green High Road, although the ward itself does not cover the entire road.

== Councillors ==
Election	Councillor	Councillor	Councillor
1978	Victor Butler (Lab)	Maureen Dewar (Lab)	Collin Ware (Lab)
1982	Victor Butler (Lab)	Maureen Dewar (Lab)	Collin Ware (Lab)
1984 by-election	Victor Butler (Lab)	Maureen Dewar (Lab)	Max Morris (Lab)
1986	Peter Murphy (Con)	Diane Harwood (Con)	Donald Shirley (Con)
1990	Christopher Berry (Lab)	Alfred Airende (Lab)	Sheila Murphy (Con)
1992 by-election	Christopher Berry (Lab)	Alfred Airende (Lab)	Philip Murphie (Con)
1994	Jean Brown (Lab)	Alfred Airende (Lab)	Jayanti Patel (Lab)
1998	Jean Brown (Lab)	Charles Adje (Lab)	Hugh Jones (Lab)
2000 by-election	Jean Brown (Lab)	Charles Adje (Lab)	Gideon Bull (Lab)
2002	Elisabeth Santry (Lab)	Charles Adje (Lab)	Gideon Bull (Lab)
2006	Elisabeth Santry (Lab)	Charles Adje (Lab)	Gideon Bull (Lab)
2010	Anne Stennett (Lab)	Charles Adje (Lab)	Gideon Bull (Lab)
2014	Anne Stennett (Lab)	Charles Adje (Lab)	Gideon Bull (Lab)
2018	Anne Stennett (Lab)	Charles Adje (Lab)	Gideon Bull (Lab)
2022	Anne Stennett (Lab)	Yvonne Say (Lab)	Ahmed Mahbub (Lab)
2023 by-election	Anne Stennett (Lab)	Liam Carroll (Lab)	Ahmed Mahbub (Lab)
2026	Mike Hodges (Grn)	Marie Kristensen (Grn)	Beverley Berrick (Lab)

== Elections ==
=== 2026 ===
White Hart Lane (3)
Party	Candidate	Votes	%	±%
Green	Mike Hodges	1,318	40.5	N/A
Green	Marie Kristensen	1,246	38.3	N/A
Labour	Beverley Berrick	1,173	36.0	−26.6
Green	Shaan Rafiq	1,091	33.5	N/A
Labour	Ahmed Mahbub*	1,042	32.0	−28.7
Labour	Ishaq Pathan	930	28.6	−31.7
Reform	Andrew Bence	362	11.1	N/A
Reform	Jacqueline Newland	327	10.0	N/A
Conservative	Plamena Grigorova	306	9.4	−3.8
Reform	David Powder	303	9.3	N/A
Conservative	Esther Prasad	278	8.5	−3.2
Conservative	Angelos Tsangarides	261	8.0	−3.6
Liberal Democrats	Emma Chennells	246	7.6	−3.6
Liberal Democrats	Jeremy Cunnington	191	5.9	−2.0
Liberal Democrats	Robert Lindsay-Smith	173	5.3	−2.2
Turnout		3,254	34.0	+4.0
Green gain from Labour				
Green gain from Labour				
Labour hold				

=== 2023 by-election ===
The by-election took place on 4 October 2023.

2023 White Hart Lane by-election
Party	Candidate	Votes	%	±%
Labour	Liam Carroll	1,081	58.7	▼3.9
Conservative	James Barton	289	15.7	▲2.5
Green	Friedrich-Paul Ernst	247	13.4	New
Liberal Democrats	David Vigoureux	215	11.7	▲0.5
Turnout		1,843	19.64	▼9.9
Labour hold		Swing	▼	

=== 2022 ===
The election took place on 5 May 2022, under new boundaries.

White Hart Lane (3)
Party	Candidate	Votes	%	±%
Labour	Yvonne Say	1,779	62.6	
Labour	Anne Stennett	1,723	60.7	
Labour	Ahmed Mahbub	1,712	60.3	
Independent	Gideon Bull	630	22.2	
Conservative	Bradley Fage	374	13.2	
Conservative	Jeremy Krynicki	333	11.7	
Conservative	Neil O’Shea	329	11.6	
Liberal Democrats	Elizabeth Blackett	318	11.2	
Liberal Democrats	Paul Head	225	7.9	
Liberal Democrats	Adam Perry	214	7.5	
Turnout		2,840	29.55	
Labour win (new boundaries)				
Labour win (new boundaries)				
Labour win (new boundaries)				

White Hart Lane ward boundaries from 2002 to 2022

There was a revision of ward boundaries in Haringey in 2002.

=== 2018 ===
The election took place on 3 May 2018.

White Hart Lane (3)
Party	Candidate	Votes	%	±%
Labour	Charles Adje	2,094	75.1	+15.4
Labour	Gideon Bull	2,074	74.4	+11.3
Labour	Anne Stennett	1,981	71.0	+18.9
Conservative	Margaret Annie Bradley	324	11.6	+1.3
Conservative	Hazel Christina Stokes	255	9.1	−0.7
Conservative	Neil Edmund O'Shea	246	8.8	−0.6
Green	Pamela Jean Harling	199	7.1	−0.8
Green	Friedrich Paul Ernst	177	6.3	−2.9
Green	Dennis Richard Bury	155	5.6	−0.5
Liberal Democrats	Paul Head	112	4.0	−3.5
Liberal Democrats	Jean-Philippe Chenot	109	3.9	−1.8
Liberal Democrats	Cara Jenkinson	100	3.6	−1.0
Democrats and Veterans	Neville Watson	31	1.1	N/A
Turnout		2,795	31.01	−1.88
Labour hold		Swing		
Labour hold		Swing		
Labour hold		Swing		

=== 2014 ===
The election took place on 22 May 2014.

White Hart Lane (3)
Party	Candidate	Votes	%	±%
Labour	Gideon Bull	1,801	63.1	+8.3
Labour	Charles Adje	1,704	59.7	+7.9
Labour	Anne Stennett	1,486	52.1	+3.2
UKIP	Andrew Price	376	13.2	N/A
Conservative	Margaret Bradley	294	10.3	−14.8
Conservative	Roger Bradley	280	9.8	−11.5
Conservative	Melike Egin	267	9.4	−9.8
Green	Friedrich Ernst	263	9.2	+3.0
Green	Anna Evely	226	7.9	−0.4
Liberal Democrats	Ali Guvercin	213	7.5	−8.2
Green	Claire Lewis	174	6.1	+2.8
Liberal Democrats	John Elliott	163	5.7	−7.9
Liberal Democrats	Paul Head	130	4.6	−8.8
Turnout		2,870	32.89	−20.8
Labour hold		Swing		
Labour hold		Swing		
Labour hold		Swing		

=== 2010 ===
The election on 6 May 2010 took place on the same day as the United Kingdom general election.

White Hart Lane (3)
Party	Candidate	Votes	%	±%
Labour	Gideon Bull	2,499	54.8	+4.3
Labour	Charles Adje	2,363	51.8	+0.3
Labour	Anne Stennett	2,230	48.9	+4.0
Conservative	Diren Yilmaz	1,142	25.1	−2.6
Conservative	Janet Harris	972	21.3	−3.2
Conservative	Dan Isebor	875	19.2	−3.7
Liberal Democrats	Margaret Fowler	716	15.7	+3.3
Liberal Democrats	Aseye Akonou	619	13.6	+3.5
Liberal Democrats	Paul Head	613	13.4	+4.1
Green	Ruth Green	377	8.3	−0.8
Green	Friedrich-Paul Ernst	282	6.2	−2.4
Green	Nadja von Massow	149	3.3	N/A
Turnout		4,585	53.7	+19.6
Labour hold		Swing		
Labour hold		Swing		
Labour hold		Swing		

=== 2006 ===
The election took place on 4 May 2006.

White Hart Lane (3)
Party	Candidate	Votes	%	±%
Labour	Charles Adje	1,370	51.5	+3.5
Labour	Gideon Bull	1,344	50.5	−0.6
Labour	Elisabeth Santry	1,195	44.9	+3.2
Conservative	Justin Hinchcliffe	737	27.7	−4.9
Conservative	Eric Lattimore	652	24.5	−7.9
Conservative	Thomas Mason	608	22.9	−11.4
Liberal Democrats	David Bartlett	330	12.4	+4.2
Liberal Democrats	Isabel de Sudea	269	10.1	+2.0
Liberal Democrats	Shantanu Guha	246	9.3	+1.9
Green	James Grinham	242	9.1	N/A
Green	Friedrich Ernst	230	8.6	−1.9
Turnout		2,675	34.1	+11.6
Labour hold		Swing		
Labour hold		Swing		
Labour hold		Swing		

=== 2002 ===
The election took place on 2 May 2002, under new boundaries.

White Hart Lane (3)
Party	Candidate	Votes	%	±%
Labour	Gideon Bull	869	51.1	
Labour	Charles Adje	815	48.0	
Labour	Elisabeth Santry	709	41.7	
Conservative	Tony Cox	583	34.3	
Conservative	Justin Hinchcliffe	554	32.6	
Conservative	Eric Lattimore	550	32.4	
Green	Friedrich-Paul Ernst	178	10.5	
Liberal Democrats	Mary Hort	140	8.2	
Liberal Democrats	Martin Hay	137	8.1	
Liberal Democrats	Frederick Nicholls	126	7.4	
Turnout		1,706	22.5	
Labour win (new boundaries)				
Labour win (new boundaries)				
Labour win (new boundaries)				

=== 2000 by-election ===
White Hart Lane by-election, 14 December 2000
Party	Candidate	Votes	%	±%
Labour	Gideon Bull	395	44.6	−11.3
Conservative	Eric F. Lattimore	256	28.9	+6.3
Liberal Democrats	Neil Williams	156	17.6	+4.5
Socialist Alliance	Gary A. McFarlane	61	6.9	N/A
Green	Peter Budge	17	1.9	N/A
Majority		139	15.7	
Turnout		885	13.7	
Labour hold		Swing		

=== 1998 ===
The election took place on 7 May 1998.

White Hart Lane (3)
Party	Candidate	Votes	%	±%
Labour	Jean Brown	942	60.9	+8.4
Labour	Hugh Jones	864	55.9	+8.1
Labour	Charles Adje	744	48.1	+5.5
Conservative	Philip Murphie	352	22.8	−11.8
Conservative	Eric Lattimore	349	22.6	−9.2
Conservative	Jace Maclaren	347	22.4	−7.1
Liberal Democrats	Neil Williams	202	13.1	+6.2
Turnout		1,557	24.3	−17.0
Labour hold		Swing		
Labour hold		Swing		
Labour hold		Swing		

=== 1994 ===
The election took place on 5 May 1994.

White Hart Lane (3)
Party	Candidate	Votes	%	±%
Labour	Jean Brown	1,412	52.5	+8.9
Labour	Alfred Airende	1,285	47.8	+5.5
Labour	Jayanti Patel	1,146	42.6	+5.2
Conservative	Philip Murphie	931	34.6	−5.5
Conservative	Sybil James	856	31.8	−6.0
Conservative	Roger Smethurst	794	29.5	−8.1
Green	Elizabeth Adams	255	9.5	−1.7
Liberal Democrats	Roberta Mehmed	186	6.9	−0.5
Liberal Democrats	Mustafa Mehmed	181	6.7	N/A
Liberal Democrats	Winnie Zambra	71	2.6	N/A
Turnout		2,704	41.3	−2.1
Labour hold		Swing		
Labour hold		Swing		
Labour gain from Conservative		Swing		

=== 1992 by-election ===
White Hart Lane by-election, 24 September 1992
Party	Candidate	Votes	%	±%
Conservative	Philip N. Murphie	896	47.7	+7.6
Labour	Simon Jennings	816	43.5	+6.1
Liberal Democrats	Jennifer L. Perkins	127	6.8	−0.6
Green	David H. Burns	39	2.1	−9.1
Turnout			27.6	
Conservative hold		Swing		

=== 1990 ===
The election took place on 3 May 1990.

White Hart Lane (3)
Party	Candidate	Votes	%
Labour	Christopher Berry	1,368	41.85
Labour	Alfred Airende	1,329	
Conservative	Sheila Murphy	1,261	39.22
Conservative	Donna Shirley	1,188	
Conservative	Hugh McKinney	1,181	
Labour	Robert Shooter	1,175	
Green	Elizabeth Adams	353	11.44
Liberal Democrats	Frank Roberts	231	7.49
Registered electors		7,248	
Turnout		3146	43.41
Rejected ballots		5	0.16
Labour gain from Conservative			
Labour gain from Conservative			
Conservative hold			

=== 1986 ===
The election took place on 8 May 1986.

White Hart Lane (3)
Party	Candidate	Votes	%	±%
Conservative	Peter Murphy	1,827	47.6	+13.1
Conservative	Diane Harwood	1,783	46.4	+12.3
Conservative	Donald Shirley	1,764	45.9	+13.2
Labour	Vic Butler	1,300	33.8	−10.3
Labour	Maureen Dewar	1,178	30.7	−12.0
Labour	Max Morris	1,142	29.7	−11.1
Alliance (SDP)	Kenneth Shepherd	523	13.6	−1.7
Alliance (SDP)	Dean Overton	441	11.5	−2.9
Alliance (SDP)	Marc Bernstein	431	11.2	−3.1
Turnout		3,842	51.7	+12.1
Conservative gain from Labour		Swing		
Conservative gain from Labour		Swing		
Conservative gain from Labour		Swing		

=== 1984 by-election ===
White Hart Lane by-election, 25 October 1984
Party	Candidate	Votes	%	±%
Labour	Max Morris	1,291	51.7	+10.9
Conservative	Frank Kuhl	848	33.9	−0.6
Alliance	Kenneth Shepherd	338	13.5	−1.8
Ecology	Jon White	21	0.8	N/A
Turnout			34.1	
Labour hold		Swing		

=== 1982 ===
The election took place on 6 May 1982.

White Hart Lane (3)
Party	Candidate	Votes	%	±%
Labour	Victor Butler	1,354	44.1	−9.1
Labour	Maureen Dewar	1,311	42.7	−2.0
Labour	Collin Ware	1,252	40.8	−2.7
Conservative	Ian Johnston	1,058	34.5	−0.1
Conservative	Michael Osborne	1,048	34.1	+1.8
Conservative	Gladys Weeks	1,005	32.7	+0.7
Alliance (SDP)	Kenneth Shepherd	469	15.3	N/A
Alliance (Liberal)	David Green	443	14.4	N/A
Alliance (Liberal)	Edgar Bradshaw	440	14.3	N/A
Turnout		3,069	39.6	−0.7
Labour hold		Swing		
Labour hold		Swing		
Labour hold		Swing		

=== 1978 ===
The election took place on 4 May 1978.

White Hart Lane (3)
Party	Candidate	Votes	%	±%
Labour	Victor Butler	1,676	53.2	
Labour	Maureen Dewar	1,410	44.7	
Labour	Collin Ware	1,370	43.5	
Conservative	Bert Baker	1,092	34.6	
Conservative	Charles Franklin	1,017	32.3	
Conservative	Ronald Hoskins	1,009	32.0	
National Front	Robert Frost	299	9.5	
National Front	Wilfred Cleaves	276	8.8	
National Front	Bruce Pell	269	8.5	
Turnout		3,153	40.3	
Labour win (new seat)				
Labour win (new seat)				
Labour win (new seat)				

== Demographics ==
Wards of Haringey

As of 2018, the ward has a population of 14,043; a high proportion of them are from ethnic backgrounds. Those of black ethnicity form the largest ethnic grouping in the ward, representing 28.3% of the population, with white British at 23%. 50.8% of the population identify themselves as Christian and 23.9% Muslims.

The ward is the second-most deprived in Haringey, and one of the most deprived in London. The ward has proportionally the most number of households in social housing in Haringey, and the second highest level of unemployment. It also has a higher level of crime and lower life expectancy compared to Haringey overall.

== Local features ==
There are nine listed buildings in the ward, including Bruce Castle and the War Memorial at Tottenham Cemetery. The football club in the ward is the Haringey Borough F.C. Although also named White Hart Lane, the White Hart Lane railway station and the former home of Tottenham Hotspur F.C., the White Hart Lane stadium (since replaced by Tottenham Hotspur Stadium), are in the neighbouring ward of Northumberland Park.
