= Bruce Castle (ward) =

Electoral ward in London, England

- Electoral ward for the Haringey London Borough Council
- Borough: Haringey
- County: Greater London
- Population: 13,477 (2021)
- Area: 1.083 km²

Current electoral ward
- Created: 2022
- Number of members: 3
- Councillors: Ibrahim Ali; Dan Johnson; Sue Jameson

Bruce Castle is an electoral ward in the London Borough of Haringey. The ward was first used in the 2022 elections and elects three councillors to Haringey London Borough Council.

== Geography ==
The ward is named after Bruce Castle in Tottenham.

== Councillors ==
Election	Councillor	Councillor	Councillor
2022	Ibrahim Ali (Lab)	Erdal Dogan (Lab)	Sue Jameson (Lab)
2026	Ibrahim Ali (Lab)	Dan Johnson (Grn)	Sue Jameson (Lab)

== Elections ==
=== 2022 ===
Bruce Castle (3)
Party	Candidate	Votes	%	±%
Labour	Ibrahim Ali	1,621	71.4	
Labour	Erdal Dogan*	1,574	69.3	
Labour	Sue Jameson	1,574	69.3	
Green	Pamela Harling	372	16.4	
Conservative	James Barton	268	11.8	
Conservative	Agnieszka Bielecka	221	9.7	
Conservative	Niveda Moorthy	205	9.0	
Liberal Democrats	Alison Prager	164	7.2	
Liberal Democrats	Alex Sweet	137	6.0	
Liberal Democrats	Matthew Fenby Taylor	132	5.8	
Turnout		2,271	25.43	
Labour win (new seat)				
Labour win (new seat)				
Labour win (new seat)				

=== 2026 ===
Bruce Castle (3)
Party	Candidate	Votes	%	±%
Labour	Ibrahim Ali	1,298	46.1	−25.3
Green	Dan Johnson	1,209	42.9	+26.5
Labour	Sue Jameson	1,068	37.9	−31.4
Labour	Duygu Toguz	937	33.3	−36.0
Socialist Alliance	Amelie Cooper	599	21.3	N/A
Socialist Alliance	Paul Burnham	528	18.8	N/A
Conservative	James Barton	275	9.8	−2.0
Conservative	Kehinde Ajao	238	8.5	−1.2
Reform	Kevin Blackwell	238	8.5	N/A
Reform	John Poulter	230	8.2	N/A
Liberal Democrats	Justin Hinchcliffe	184	6.5	−0.7
Liberal Democrats	Cara Jenkinson	181	6.4	+0.4
Conservative	Queenjane Tobin	176	6.3	−2.7
Liberal Democrats	Paul Negus	134	4.8	−1.0
Turnout		2,815	32.7	+7.27
Rejected ballots		28		
Labour hold				
Green gain from Labour				
Labour hold				
