= Haringey London Borough Council =

Local government body in London, England

- Coat of arms

- Council logo

Type
- Type: London borough council

Leadership
- Mayor: Dawn Barnes, Liberal Democrats since 20 May 2026
- Leader: Mark Blake, Green since 20 May 2026
- Chief Executive: Andy Donald since February 2022

Structure
- Seats: 57 councillors
- Political groups: Administration (28) Green (28) Opposition (29) Labour (21) Liberal Democrats (8)
- Length of term: Whole council elected every four years

Elections
- Voting system: Plurality at-large (FPTP)
- Last election: 7 May 2026
- Next election: 2 May 2030

Meeting place
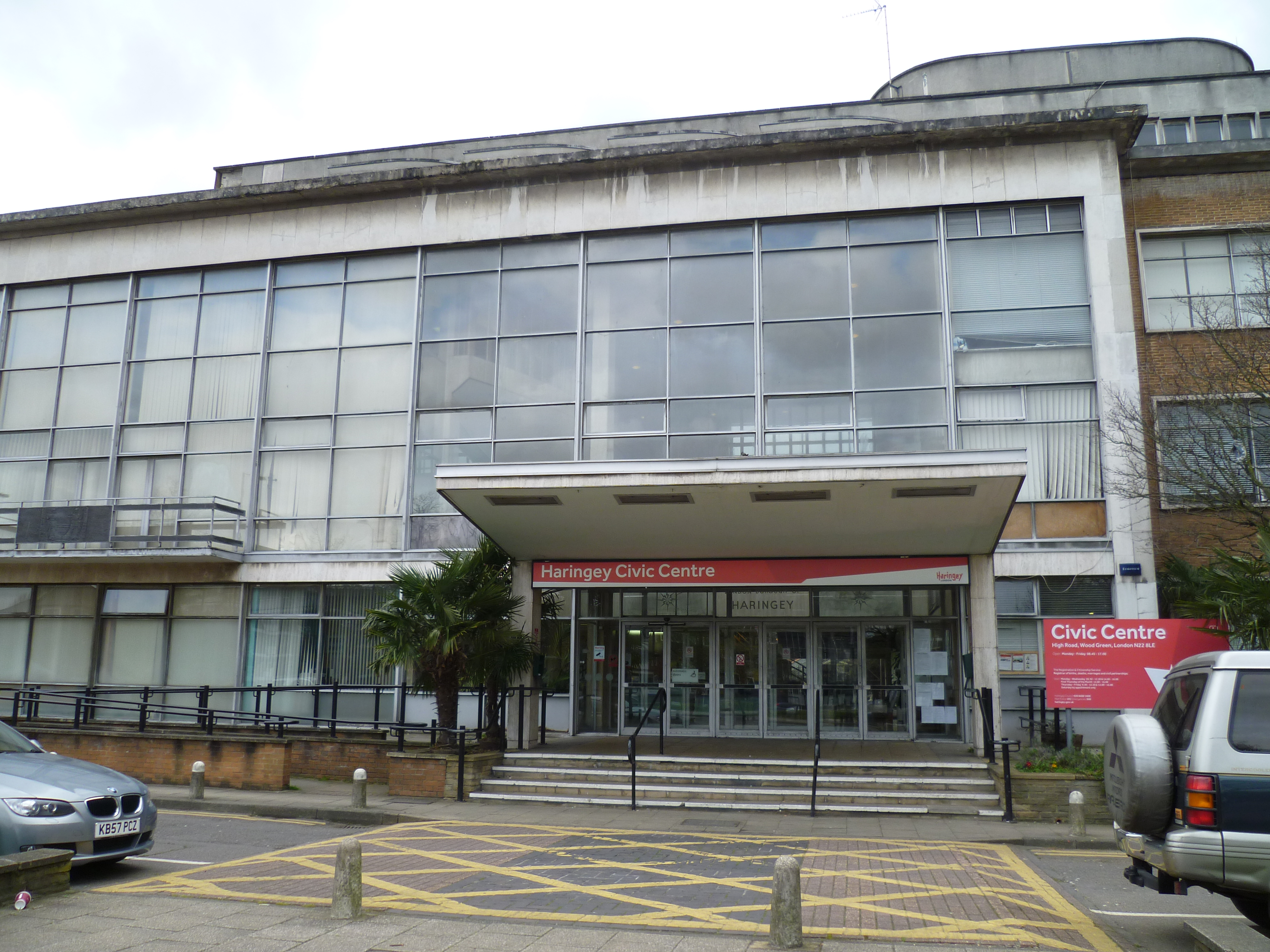
- Haringey Civic Centre; 255 High Road, Wood Green, London

Website
- www.haringey.gov.uk

Haringey London Borough Council, also known as Haringey Council, is the local authority for the London Borough of Haringey in Greater London, England. The council is responsible for providing a range of local services within the borough of Haringey. The council is under no overall control, with the Greens being the largest party, having previously been under Labour majority control since 1971. The council is usually based at Haringey Civic Centre in Wood Green, although the building has been closed since 2020 pending refurbishment.

== History ==
The London Borough of Haringey and its council were created under the London Government Act 1963, with the first election held in 1964. For its first year the council acted as a shadow authority alongside the area's three outgoing authorities, being the borough councils of Hornsey, Tottenham and Wood Green. The new council formally came into its powers on 1 April 1965, at which point the old boroughs and their councils were abolished. The council's full legal name is "The Mayor and Burgesses of the London Borough of Haringey".

From 1965 until 1986 the council was a lower-tier authority, with upper-tier functions provided by the Greater London Council. The split of powers and functions meant that the Greater London Council was responsible for "wide area" services such as fire, ambulance, flood prevention, and refuse disposal; with the boroughs (including Haringey) responsible for "personal" services such as social care, libraries, cemeteries and refuse collection. As an outer London borough council Haringey has been a local education authority since 1965. The Greater London Council was abolished in 1986 and its functions passed to the London Boroughs, with some services provided through joint committees.

Since 2000 the Greater London Authority has taken some responsibility for highways and planning control from the council, but within the English local government system the council remains a "most purpose" authority in terms of the available range of powers and functions.

For several years, Haringey Council was the subject of criticism over its handling of the welfare of young children, notably in connection with the murder of Victoria Climbié in 2000 and the killing of Peter Connelly ("Baby P") in 2007. George Meehan, leader of the council at the time of both the Victoria Climbie inquiry and the death of Baby P, resigned after a "damning" examination of the council's social services functions following by the Baby P case. In March 2009, Haringey Council's performance was placed by the Audit Commission in the bottom four of the country and the worst in London. In December 2009, Haringey's performance was placed by Ofsted in the bottom nine in the country for children's services. A later series of positive Ofsted inspections culminated in the service being taken out of 'special measures' by the government in February 2013.

In 2017, the council proposed a partnership with Lendlease for developing council-owned land known as the Haringey Development Vehicle, which was controversial locally. The subsequent political fall-out led to the resignation of council leader, Claire Kober.

== Powers and functions ==
The local authority derives its powers and functions from the London Government Act 1963 and subsequent legislation, and has the powers and functions of a London borough council. It sets council tax and as a billing authority it also collects precepts for Greater London Authority functions and business rates. It sets planning policies which complement Greater London Authority and national policies, and decides on almost all planning applications accordingly. It is also the local education authority.

== Political control ==
The council has been under no overall control since the 2026 election, being run by a Green Party minority administration. Prior to the 2026 election, the council had been under Labour majority control since 1971.

The first election was held in 1964, initially operating as a shadow authority alongside the outgoing authorities until it came into its powers on 1 April 1965. Political control of the council since 1965 has been as follows:

Party in control	Years
Labour	1965–1968
Conservative	1968–1971
Labour	1971–2026
No overall control	2026–present

=== Leadership ===
The role of mayor is largely ceremonial in Haringey. Political leadership is instead provided by the leader of the council. The leaders since 1965 have been:

Councillor	Party	From	To
John McIlwain	Labour	1965	1967
Sheila Berkery-Smith	Labour	1967	1968
Peter Rigby	Conservative	1968	1971
Sheila Berkery-Smith	Labour	1971	1973
Colin Ware	Labour	1973	1980
Robin Young	Labour	1980	1982
Angela Greatley	Labour	1982	1983
George Meehan	Labour	1983	1984
Bernie Grant	Labour	1984	1987
Toby Harris	Labour	1987	1999
George Meehan	Labour	1999	2004
Charles Adje	Labour	24 May 2004	May 2006
George Meehan	Labour	22 May 2006	1 Dec 2008
Claire Kober	Labour	9 Dec 2008	May 2018
Joseph Ejiofor	Labour	24 May 2018	May 2021
Peray Ahmet	Labour	27 May 2021	May 2026
Mark Blake	Green	20 May 2026	

=== Composition ===
Following the 2026 election, the composition of the council was as follows:

Party	Councillors
Green	28
Labour	21
Liberal Democrats	8
Total	57

The next election is due in May 2030.

== Wards ==
The wards of Haringey and the number of seats:

1. Alexandra Park (2)
2. Bounds Green (2)
3. Bruce Castle (3)
4. Crouch End (3)
5. Fortis Green (3)
6. Harringay (3)
7. Hermitage & Gardens (2)
8. Highgate (3)
9. Hornsey (3)
10. Muswell Hill (2)
11. Noel Park (3)
12. Northumberland Park (3)
13. Seven Sisters (2)
14. South Tottenham (3)
15. St Ann's (2)
16. Stroud Green (3)
17. Tottenham Central (3)
18. Tottenham Hale (3)
19. West Green (3)
20. White Hart Lane (3)
21. Woodside (3)

== Elections ==
Since the last boundary changes in 2022 the council has comprised 57 councillors representing 21 wards, with each ward electing two or three councillors. Elections are held every four years.

== Premises ==
The council is usually based at Haringey Civic Centre on High Road in Wood Green, which had been completed in 1958 for the old Wood Green Borough Council. The building closed in 2020 after structural issues were identified. Council meetings are temporarily being held at other venues, including Tottenham Town Hall and George Meehan House. The council is refurbishing the Civic Centre, which is due to reopen in 2027.
