= 2014 Haringey London Borough Council election =

2014 local election in England

2014 Haringey Council election
← 2010	22 May 2014	2018 →

All 57 seats on Haringey London Borough Council

	First party	Second party
Leader	Claire Kober	Richard Wilson
Party	Labour	Liberal Democrats
Leader since	November 2008	13 May 2011
Leader's seat	Seven Sisters	Stroud Green (Lost)
Last election	34 seats, 39.6%	23 seats, 35.6%
Seats won	48	9
Seat change	▲14	▼14
Popular vote	94,401	39,119
Percentage	50.1%	19.9%
Swing	▲10.5%	▼14.8%
- Map of the results of the 2014 Haringey council election. Labour in red and Liberal Democrats in yellow.
Council control before election
Labour
Council control after election
Labour

The 2014 Haringey Council election took place on 22 May 2014 to elect members of Haringey Council in England. This was on the same day as other local elections.

Labour retained control of the council, winning 14 seats from the Liberal Democrats to increase their majority from 11 seats to 39 seats. In total, Labour won 48 seats (+14) and the Lib Dems won 9 seats (-14). No other parties were represented on the council.

== Results ==
Haringey Council election result 2014
Party	Seats	Gains	Losses	Net gain/loss	Seats %	Votes %	Votes	+/−
Labour	48	14	0	+14	84.2	50.1	94,401	+10.5
Liberal Democrats	9	0	14	-14	15.8	20.8	39,119	-14.8
Green	0	0	0	0	0.0	15.4	29,031	+5.7
Conservative	0	0	0	0	0.0	9.9	18,549	-4.7
TUSC	0	0	0	0	0.0	2.2	4,166	n/a
UKIP	0	0	0	0	0.0	1.0	1,891	n/a
Independent	0	0	0	0	0.0	0.6	1,129	+0.3

== Ward results ==
=== Alexandra ===
Alexandra (3)
Party	Candidate	Votes	%	±%
Labour	Liz McShane	1,445	35.2	+9.1
Labour	James Patterson	1,395	34.0	+11.4
Liberal Democrats	David Beacham*	1,284	31.3	−20.1
Labour	Charles Wright	1,247	30.4	+8.9
Liberal Democrats	Indijiana Harper	1,244	30.3	−19.3
Liberal Democrats	John Fynaut	1,211	29.5	−18.8
Green	Lucy Craig	1,170	28.5	+12.1
Green	Gordon Peters	945	23.0	+14.4
Green	Tom Davidson	897	21.9	+14.0
Conservative	David Douglas	498	12.1	+3.3
Conservative	Sylvia Simon	452	11.0	−0.5
Conservative	Ali Ismail	407	9.9	−2.3
Turnout		4,125	48.38	−25.6
Labour gain from Liberal Democrats		Swing		
Labour gain from Liberal Democrats		Swing		
Liberal Democrats hold		Swing		

=== Bounds Green ===
Bounds Green (3)
Party	Candidate	Votes	%	±%
Labour	Clare Bull	1,875	53.2	+7.4
Labour	Joanna Christophides*	1,870	53.1	+9.3
Labour	Ali Demirci*	1,715	48.7	+6.9
Liberal Democrats	Sakina Chenot	881	25.0	−11.1
Liberal Democrats	Chris Jenkinson	760	21.6	−12.7
Liberal Democrats	Ashleena Deike	755	21.4	−9.8
Green	Helen Lipscomb	469	13.3	+6.2
Green	Pete McAskie	392	11.1	+6.1
Green	Andrea Phillips	392	11.1	+3.4
Conservative	Dorothy Cowan	244	6.9	−5.9
Conservative	Carol Watts	216	6.1	−6.6
UKIP	George Ganderton	209	5.9	N/A
Conservative	Mity Ragnuth	195	5.5	−6.3
Turnout		3,540	37.80	−19.8
Labour hold		Swing		
Labour hold		Swing		
Labour hold		Swing		

=== Bruce Grove ===
Bruce Grove (3)
Party	Candidate	Votes	%	±%
Labour	Stuart McNamara*	1,762	61.4	+2.7
Labour	Joseph Ejiofor*	1,654	57.7	+0.7
Labour	Felicia Opoku	1,604	55.9	−3.1
Green	Christine de Leon	513	17.9	+7.8
Green	Anne Gray	425	14.8	+5.7
Green	Simon Treen	395	13.8	+6.8
Conservative	Richard Acheampong	307	10.7	−2.0
Conservative	Charles Everett	251	8.8	−2.6
Conservative	Lidia Kawalec	235	8.2	−2.8
TUSC	Johnny Innes	201	7.0	N/A
Liberal Democrats	Carolyn Baker	193	6.7	−12.0
TUSC	Dilan Secgin	176	6.1	N/A
Liberal Democrats	Ergun Kilinc	161	5.6	−9.0
Liberal Democrats	Daniel Houghton	141	4.9	−9.1
Turnout		2,896	30.46	−23.6
Labour hold		Swing		
Labour hold		Swing		
Labour hold		Swing		

=== Crouch End ===
Crouch End (3)
Party	Candidate	Votes	%	±%
Labour	Jason Arthur	1,451	34.7	+13.3
Labour	Natan Doron	1,435	34.3	+14.0
Liberal Democrats	Sarah Elliott	1,342	32.1	−22.5
Labour	Lourdes Keever	1,250	29.9	+10.7
Liberal Democrats	Patrick Harte	1,101	26.3	−22.3
Liberal Democrats	Brian Haley	1,099	26.3	−22.1
Green	Pamela Harling	855	20.5	+6.4
Green	Greta Sykes	705	16.9	+5.6
Green	David Norwood	658	15.7	+5.8
Independent	Lyn Weber*	647	15.5	−39.1
Conservative	Julian Sherwood	462	11.1	−4.1
Conservative	Matthew Sleat	419	10.0	−3.8
Conservative	Evan Price	397	9.5	−3.8
UKIP	Peter Thompson	214	5.1	N/A
Turnout		4,194	43.78	−27.8
Labour gain from Liberal Democrats		Swing		
Labour gain from Liberal Democrats		Swing		
Liberal Democrats hold		Swing		

=== Fortis Green ===
Fortis Green (3)
Party	Candidate	Votes	%	±%
Liberal Democrats	Martin Newton*	1,421	36.8	−8.0
Liberal Democrats	Viv Ross	1,331	34.5	−16.3
Labour	Patrick Berryman	1,260	32.6	+10.2
Labour	Rosemary Boughton	1,212	31.4	+9.8
Labour	James Bielby	1,173	30.4	+9.3
Liberal Democrats	Tom Southern	1,163	30.1	−16.7
Green	Nancy Hocking	631	16.3	+5.9
Green	Saul Blumberg	575	14.9	+5.1
Green	Nadja von Massow	510	13.2	+5.5
Conservative	Roderick Allen	508	13.2	−6.8
Conservative	Peter Forrest	460	11.9	−6.9
Conservative	Ezendu Ariwa	454	11.8	−5.4
Independent	Matt Davies*	293	7.6	−43.2
UKIP	Rajan Adwani	191	4.9	N/A
Turnout		3,868	42.41	−27.2
Liberal Democrats hold		Swing		
Liberal Democrats hold		Swing		
Labour gain from Liberal Democrats		Swing		

=== Harringay ===
Harringay (3)
Party	Candidate	Votes	%	±%
Labour	Gina Adamou*	1,683	45.7	+4.0
Labour	James Ryan	1,395	37.8	−0.3
Labour	Emine Ibrahim	1,372	37.2	+6.3
Liberal Democrats	Karen Alexander*	1,182	32.1	−10.8
Liberal Democrats	David Schmitz*	1,139	30.9	−7.4
Liberal Democrats	Asha Kaur	878	23.8	−10.9
Green	Matthew Cuthbert	657	17.8	+6.2
Green	Tristan Smith	572	15.5	+8.4
Green	Kerry Smith-Jefferys	558	15.1	+4.4
TUSC	David Kaplan	219	5.9	N/A
Conservative	Sean Rivers	219	5.9	−2.7
Conservative	Lydia Rivlin	212	5.8	−2.6
Conservative	Massimo Rossini	200	5.4	−2.5
TUSC	Patrick Burland	165	4.5	N/A
TUSC	Kan Patel	132	3.6	N/A
Turnout		3,701	40.52	−19.0
Labour hold		Swing		
Labour gain from Liberal Democrats		Swing		
Labour gain from Liberal Democrats		Swing		

=== Highgate ===
Highgate (3)
Party	Candidate	Votes	%	±%
Liberal Democrats	Liz Morris	1,372	37.8	−16.9
Liberal Democrats	Bob Hare*	1,228	33.9	−11.3
Liberal Democrats	Clive Carter	1,140	31.4	−10.5
Labour	Janet Boston	1,043	28.8	+9.8
Labour	John Woolf	921	25.4	+9.4
Conservative	Antony Denyer	893	24.6	−2.3
Conservative	Kay Carter	881	24.3	±0.0
Labour	Peter Clarke	859	23.7	+8.7
Conservative	Celia Surtees	829	22.9	+0.7
Green	Alexander Lawrenson	539	14.9	+4.8
Green	Edward Milford	422	11.6	+3.3
Green	Noel Lynch	406	11.2	+3.0
Turnout		3,648	43.71	−26.8
Liberal Democrats hold		Swing		
Liberal Democrats hold		Swing		
Liberal Democrats hold		Swing		

=== Hornsey ===
Hornsey (3)
Party	Candidate	Votes	%	±%
Labour	Adam Jogee	1,967	47.6	+12.9
Labour	Jennifer Mann	1,887	45.7	+16.1
Labour	Elin Weston	1,841	44.6	+16.3
Liberal Democrats	Dawn Barnes	1,276	30.9	−13.2
Liberal Democrats	Errol Reid*	1,216	29.4	−14.4
Liberal Democrats	Gillian Kilby	1,169	28.3	−14.1
Green	Mary Hogan	576	13.9	+2.2
Green	Peter Budge	525	12.7	+2.1
Green	Duncan Ford	446	10.8	+1.0
Conservative	Aidan Crook	248	6.0	−3.5
UKIP	Tom Coyle	210	5.1	+2.8
Conservative	Alice Pastides	204	4.9	−4.5
Conservative	Clark Vasey	187	4.5	−4.4
Turnout		4,148	44.77	−22.0
Labour gain from Liberal Democrats		Swing		
Labour gain from Liberal Democrats		Swing		
Labour gain from Liberal Democrats		Swing		

=== Muswell Hill ===
Muswell Hill (3)
Party	Candidate	Votes	%	±%
Liberal Democrats	Pippa Connor	1,492	38.4	−14.8
Liberal Democrats	Gail Engert*	1,476	38.0	−15.8
Labour	Mark Blake	1,438	37.0	+12.4
Liberal Democrats	Cara Jenkinson	1,384	35.6	−10.0
Labour	Emma Whysall	1,291	33.2	+13.2
Labour	Elliot Roberts	1,208	31.1	+11.3
Green	Joyce Rosser	647	16.7	+7.0
Green	Jeremy Green	626	16.1	+2.4
Green	Christopher Barker	604	15.6	+6.3
Conservative	Guy Carter	396	10.2	−4.0
Conservative	Daphne Forrest	369	9.5	−5.5
Conservative	Kay Curtis	350	9.0	−4.1
Turnout		3,900	48.85	−24.6
Liberal Democrats hold		Swing		
Liberal Democrats hold		Swing		
Labour gain from Liberal Democrats		Swing		

=== Noel Park ===
Noel Park (3)
Party	Candidate	Votes	%	±%
Labour	Peray Ahmet	1,897	59.4	+15.0
Labour	Denise Marshall	1,807	56.6	+14.8
Labour	Alan Strickland*	1,782	55.8	+17.3
Green	Sophie Ball	503	15.8	+6.9
Liberal Democrats	Roberto Robles	492	15.5	−20.5
Liberal Democrats	Colin Heinink	491	15.4	−18.0
Liberal Democrats	Vik Seeborun	437	13.7	−15.3
Green	Mike McGowan	332	10.4	+3.1
Green	Peter Johnston	309	9.7	+4.2
UKIP	Sam Catling	220	6.9	N/A
Conservative	Esther Burdett	213	6.7	−8.1
Conservative	Ewa Ostrowski	210	6.6	−6.1
Conservative	Neil O'Shea	163	5.1	−7.5
Independent	Pauline Gibson*	128	4.0	−40.4
Turnout		3,203	33.60	−21.9
Labour hold		Swing		
Labour hold		Swing		
Labour hold		Swing		

=== Northumberland Park ===
Northumberland Park (3)
Party	Candidate	Votes	%	±%
Labour	Sheila Peacock*	1,930	66.4	+9.1
Labour	Kaushika Amin*	1,796	61.8	+5.7
Labour	John Bevan*	1,791	61.6	+1.7
TUSC	Ibrahim Avcil	439	15.1	N/A
Green	Emily Lambert	306	10.5	+5.4
TUSC	Paul Burnham	274	9.4	N/A
Conservative	Janet Harris	239	8.2	−2.5
Conservative	Eric Lattimore	199	6.8	−3.8
Conservative	Bart Warszawski	184	6.3	−4.3
Green	Martina Weitsch	177	6.1	+1.6
Green	Mridu Thanki	173	5.9	+1.9
Liberal Democrats	Leonidas Leonida	135	4.6	−9.8
Liberal Democrats	John Thompson	133	4.6	−3.0
Liberal Democrats	Valerie Mortimer	97	3.3	−7.6
Turnout		2,937	31.99	−24.2
Labour hold		Swing		
Labour hold		Swing		
Labour hold		Swing		

=== Seven Sisters ===
Seven Sisters (3)
Party	Candidate	Votes	%	±%
Labour	Dhiren Basu*	2,190	58.7	+6.2
Labour	Joe Goldberg*	2,176	58.3	+4.0
Labour	Claire Kober*	2,156	57.8	+6.7
Green	David Bennie	582	15.6	+5.5
Green	Fiona Poustie	539	14.4	+7.5
Green	Stephen Frost	485	13.0	+6.2
Conservative	Daniel Babis	443	11.9	−9.0
Conservative	Justin Hinchcliffe	413	11.1	−8.3
Conservative	Kemal Elkoca	386	10.3	−10.5
TUSC	Oktay Sahbaz	252	6.8	N/A
Liberal Democrats	Ilkin Gokdemir	187	5.0	−10.1
TUSC	Derek Bishop	182	4.9	N/A
Liberal Democrats	David Oxford	157	4.2	−10.5
Liberal Democrats	Hakki Tatar	110	2.9	−9.0
Turnout		3,757	36.97	−19.6
Labour hold		Swing		
Labour hold		Swing		
Labour hold		Swing		

=== St Ann's ===
St Ann's (3)
Party	Candidate	Votes	%	±%
Labour	Barbara Blake	1,829	58.5	+7.0
Labour	Peter Morton	1,508	48.2	−0.1
Labour	Ali Ozbek	1,491	47.7	+0.9
Green	Emily Darko	757	24.2	+15.2
Green	Matthew Pollitt	530	16.9	+8.0
Green	Zeynep Kacmaz	497	15.9	+8.2
TUSC	Simon Hester	271	8.7	+4.5
Conservative	Scott Green	251	8.0	−4.5
Liberal Democrats	Alison Prager	243	7.8	−17.3
TUSC	Andrew Reid	236	7.5	N/A
Liberal Democrats	Mihai Ghertan	217	6.9	−16.7
UKIP	Peter Nichols	212	6.8	N/A
Liberal Democrats	Tola Ariyo	210	6.7	−16.0
Conservative	Melinda Koller	194	6.2	−6.2
Conservative	Nathan Parsad	175	5.6	−6.0
Turnout		3,147	32.50	−19.6
Labour hold		Swing		
Labour hold		Swing		
Labour hold		Swing		

=== Stroud Green ===
Stroud Green (3)
Party	Candidate	Votes	%	±%
Labour	Kirsten Hearn	1,760	42.6	+16.0
Labour	Timothy Gallagher	1,757	42.5	+16.4
Labour	Raj Sahota	1,492	36.1	+10.7
Liberal Democrats	Ben Myring	1,309	31.7	−16.6
Liberal Democrats	Richard Wilson*	1,244	30.1	−10.5
Liberal Democrats	Katherine Reece*	1,226	29.7	−12.9
Green	Anne Lavery	816	19.7	−0.9
Green	Mark Anstee	725	17.5	−2.7
Green	Dennis Bury	694	16.8	−2.8
Conservative	Peter Gilbert	238	5.8	−1.7
Conservative	Barry Garfield	227	5.5	−1.8
Conservative	Sally Lumb	227	5.5	−1.6
TUSC	Nicholas Auvache	149	3.6	N/A
Turnout		4,152	45.85	−23.0
Labour gain from Liberal Democrats		Swing		
Labour gain from Liberal Democrats		Swing		
Labour gain from Liberal Democrats		Swing		

=== Tottenham Green ===
Tottenham Green (3)
Party	Candidate	Votes	%	±%
Labour	Isidoros Diakides*	1,808	57.9	−0.8
Labour	Makbule Gunes	1,795	57.5	+6.2
Labour	Bernice Vanier*	1,741	55.7	−1.3
Green	Judith Hanna	611	19.6	+8.6
Green	John Dixon	546	17.5	+7.6
Green	Chris Henderson	421	13.5	+2.8
Conservative	Agnieszka Bielecka	351	11.2	+0.5
Conservative	George Dristas	260	8.3	−1.8
TUSC	Patrick Cook	235	7.5	N/A
Conservative	Denis Lobidel	219	7.0	−2.4
Liberal Democrats	Neville Collins	216	6.9	−13.0
TUSC	Gary McFarlane	199	6.4	N/A
Liberal Democrats	Robbie Cowbury	170	5.4	−10.3
Liberal Democrats	Kathy Riddle	158	5.1	−9.8
Turnout		3,148	31.90	−17.3
Labour hold		Swing		
Labour hold		Swing		
Labour hold		Swing		

=== Tottenham Hale ===
Tottenham Hale (3)
Party	Candidate	Votes	%	±%
Labour	Lorna Reith*	2,210	69.5	+7.7
Labour	Vincent Carroll	2,152	67.7	+10.3
Labour	Reg Rice*	2,030	63.8	+5.3
Green	Robert Adam	479	15.1	+8.5
Green	Simon Haldon	337	10.6	+4.6
Conservative	Helen Dargue	330	10.4	−4.1
Conservative	Paul Lemanowicz	316	9.9	−3.2
Green	Ben Levitas	296	9.3	+4.0
Conservative	Kay Lancucki	256	8.1	−4.9
Liberal Democrats	Eliza Kaczynska-Nay	193	6.1	−9.7
Liberal Democrats	Jeremy Cunnington	183	5.8	−6.6
Liberal Democrats	Thuranie Aruliah	164	5.2	−8.1
Turnout		3,212	31.83	−20.2
Labour hold		Swing		
Labour hold		Swing		
Labour hold		Swing		

=== West Green ===
West Green (3)
Party	Candidate	Votes	%	±%
Labour	Eddie Griffith*	1,780	58.0	+3.5
Labour	Eugene Akwasi-Ayisi	1,772	57.7	+7.8
Labour	Toni Mallett*	1,697	55.3	+5.4
Green	Jacqueline Ashworth	455	14.8	+1.7
Conservative	David Allen	383	12.5	−5.2
Green	John Jorgensen	361	11.8	+4.6
Conservative	Shengul Elmaz	326	10.6	−6.6
Green	George Mackie	325	10.6	+3.3
Conservative	Caesar Lalobo	290	9.4	−7.4
Liberal Democrats	Ramazan Alma	238	7.8	−12.6
TUSC	Jenny Sutton	237	7.7	N/A
Liberal Democrats	Savas Oktay	215	7.0	−12.1
Liberal Democrats	Alexander Sweet	177	5.8	−12.4
TUSC	Hesketh Benoit	176	5.7	N/A
TUSC	Jacek Szymanski	154	5.0	N/A
Turnout		3,083	33.74	−19.8
Labour hold		Swing		
Labour hold		Swing		
Labour hold		Swing		

=== White Hart Lane ===
White Hart Lane (3)
Party	Candidate	Votes	%	±%
Labour	Gideon Bull*	1,801	63.1	+8.3
Labour	Charles Adje*	1,704	59.7	+7.9
Labour	Anne Stennett*	1,486	52.1	+3.2
UKIP	Andrew Price	376	13.2	N/A
Conservative	Margaret Bradley	294	10.3	−14.8
Conservative	Roger Bradley	280	9.8	−11.5
Conservative	Melike Egin	267	9.4	−9.8
Green	Friedrich Ernst	263	9.2	+3.0
Green	Anna Evely	226	7.9	−0.4
Liberal Democrats	Ali Guvercin	213	7.5	−8.2
Green	Claire Lewis	174	6.1	+2.8
Liberal Democrats	John Elliott	163	5.7	−7.9
Liberal Democrats	Paul Head	130	4.6	−8.8
Turnout		2,870	32.89	−20.8
Labour hold		Swing		
Labour hold		Swing		
Labour hold		Swing		

=== Woodside ===
Woodside (3)
Party	Candidate	Votes	%	±%
Labour	George Meehan*	2,018	61.7	+16.0
Labour	Patrick Egan*	1,947	59.5	+12.1
Labour	Ann Waters*	1,865	57.0	+15.1
Liberal Democrats	Craig Brown	418	12.8	−22.9
Green	Kathryn Dean	406	12.4	+5.8
Liberal Democrats	Roxanne Squire	393	12.0	−21.7
Liberal Democrats	Kirsty Allan	361	11.0	−19.7
Green	David Rennie	342	10.4	+4.4
Conservative	David Noble	271	8.3	−4.0
UKIP	Jodie Gravett	259	7.9	N/A
Green	Mike Shaughnessy	254	7.8	+1.9
Conservative	Laurence Pearce	244	7.5	−3.9
Conservative	David Sheen	207	6.3	−4.7
TUSC	Jack Gautami	100	3.1	N/A
Independent	Bee Adan	61	1.9	N/A
Turnout		3,295	35.50	−20.8
Labour hold		Swing		
Labour hold		Swing		
Labour hold		Swing		

== By-Elections ==
Woodside by-election 2 October 2014
Party	Candidate	Votes	%	±%
Labour	Charles Wright	1,331	56.3	−3.2
Liberal Democrats	Dawn Barnes	482	20.4	+7.6
Green	Tom Davidson	191	8.1	−4.3
UKIP	Andrew Price	161	6.8	−1.1
Conservative	Scott Green	140	5.9	−2.4
TUSC	Vivek Lehal	35	2.8	−0.3
Independent	Pauline Gibson	23	1.0	N/A
Majority		849	35.9	
Turnout		2,363	25.03	−10.47
Labour hold		Swing		

A by-election for Woodside was called following the death of Cllr Pat Egan.

Noel Park by-election 17 September 2015
Party	Candidate	Votes	%	±%
Labour	Stephen Mann	1,005	61.3	+4.7
Liberal Democrats	Derin Adebiyi	247	15.1	−0.4
Conservative	Mike Burgess	178	10.9	+4.2
Green	Mike McGowan	124	7.6	−2.8
UKIP	Neville Watson	48	2.9	−4.0
TUSC	Paul Burnham	38	2.3	N/A
Majority		758	46.2	
Turnout		1,646	18.0	−15.6
Labour hold		Swing		

A by-election for Noel Park was called following the resignation of Cllr Denise Marshall.

Woodside by-election 17 September 2015
Party	Candidate	Votes	%	±%
Labour	Peter Mitchell	1,279	61.7	±0.0
Liberal Democrats	Jenni Hollis	435	21.0	+8.2
Conservative	Robert Broadhurst	141	6.8	−1.5
Green	Annette Baker	122	5.9	−6.5
UKIP	Andrew Price	95	4.6	−3.3
Majority		844	40.7	
Turnout		2,076	23.0	−12.0
Labour hold		Swing		

A by-election for Woodside was called following the death of Cllr George Meehan.

Harringay by-election 28 July 2016
Party	Candidate	Votes	%	±%
Labour	Zena Brabazon	1,054	46.2	+8.4
Liberal Democrats	Karen Alexander	765	33.6	+1.5
Green	Jarelle Francis	325	14.3	−3.5
Conservative	Cansoy Elmaz	99	4.3	−1.6
UKIP	Neville Watson	36	1.6	N/A
Majority		289	12.6	
Turnout		2,282	24.9	−15.6
Labour hold		Swing		

The by-election was triggered by the resignation of Councillor James Ryan

St. Ann's by-election 6 October 2016
Party	Candidate	Votes	%	±%
Labour	Noah Tucker	1,117	62.4	+14.2
Green	Ronald Stewart	323	18.1	−6.1
Liberal Democrats	Josh Dixon	189	10.6	+2.8
Conservative	Ellis Turrell	106	5.9	−2.1
UKIP	Janus Polenceusz	54	3.0	−3.8
Majority		794	44.3	
Turnout			20.67	−11.83
Labour hold		Swing		

A by-election for St Ann's was called following the resignation of Cllr Peter Morton.
