= 2018 Haringey London Borough Council election =

2018 local election in England

2018 Haringey Council election
← 2014	3 May 2018	2022 →

All 57 seats on Haringey London Borough Council

	First party	Second party
Leader	Joseph Ejiofor	Liz Morris
Party	Labour	Liberal Democrats
Leader since	2018	2018
Leader's seat	Bruce Grove	Highgate
Last election	48 seats, 50.1%	9 seats, 19.9%
Seats won	42	15
Seat change	▼6	▲6
Popular vote	112,980	47,137
Percentage	57.3%	23.9%
Swing	▲7.2%	▲3.1%
- Map of the results of the 2018 Haringey council election. Labour in red and Liberal Democrats in yellow.
Council control before election
Labour
Council control after election
Labour

The 2018 Haringey Council election took place on 3 May 2018 to elect members of Haringey Council in England. This was on the same day as other local elections.

== Results ==
Haringey Council election result 2018
Party	Seats	Gains	Losses	Net gain/loss	Seats %	Votes %	Votes	+/−
Labour	42	0	6	-6	73.7	57.3	112,980	+7.2
Liberal Democrats	15	6	0	+6	26.3	23.9	47,137	+3.1
Green	0	-	-	-	0	10.4	20,409	-5.0
Conservative	0	-	-	-	0	7.8	15,335	-2.1
TUSC	0	-	-	-	0	0.2	372	-2.0
Independent	0	-	-	-	0	0.1	287	-0.5
Duma Polska	0	-	-	-	0	0.1	195	New
Democrats and Veterans	0	-	-	-	0	0.1	133	New
English Democrat	0	-	-	-	0	0.0	87	New
CPA	0	-	-	-	0	0.0	67	New
Federalist Party	0	-	-	-	0	0.0	44	New

== Ward results ==
Voting results sourced from Haringey Votes.

=== Alexandra ===
Alexandra (3)
Party	Candidate	Votes	%	±%
Liberal Democrats	Nick Da Costa	2,028	44.7	+13.4
Liberal Democrats	Alessandra Rossetti	1,987	43.8	+13.5
Liberal Democrats	Josh Dixon	1,918	42.3	+12.8
Labour	Nikki Pound	1,785	39.4	+5.4
Labour	Liz McShane*	1,749	38.6	+3.4
Labour	Sean O'Donovan	1,658	36.6	+6.2
Green	Jeremy Green	444	9.8	−18.7
Green	Claire Lewis	403	8.9	−14.1
Conservative	Kay Carter	348	7.7	−3.3
Conservative	David Douglas	321	7.1	−5.0
Green	Ben Levitas	316	7.0	−14.9
Conservative	Daphne Forrest	273	6.0	−3.9
Turnout		4,548	54.69	+6.31
Liberal Democrats gain from Labour		Swing		
Liberal Democrats gain from Labour		Swing		
Liberal Democrats hold		Swing		

=== Bounds Green ===
Bounds Green (3)
Party	Candidate	Votes	%	±%
Labour	Pat Berryman**	2,289	62.7	+9.5
Labour	Yvonne Say	2,188	60.0	+6.9
Labour	James Chiriyankandath	2,126	58.3	+9.6
Liberal Democrats	David Beacham**	710	19.5	−5.5
Liberal Democrats	Indijana Harper	623	17.1	−4.5
Liberal Democrats	John Fynaut	579	15.9	−5.5
Green	Francesca Box	506	13.9	+0.6
Conservative	David Sheen	322	8.8	+1.9
Green	Mike Shaughnessy	303	8.3	−2.8
Conservative	James Wild	300	8.2	+2.1
Green	Kenneth Burlton	282	7.7	−3.4
Conservative	Bhaskar Mitra	275	7.5	+2.0
Turnout		3,660	38.73	+0.93
Labour hold		Swing		
Labour hold		Swing		
Labour hold		Swing		

Pat Berryman was a sitting councillor in Fortis Green ward

David Beacham was a sitting councillor in Alexandra ward

=== Bruce Grove ===
Bruce Grove (3)
Party	Candidate	Votes	%	±%
Labour	Felicia Opoku*	2,031	69.4	+13.5
Labour	Joseph Ejiofor*	1,988	67.9	+10.2
Labour	Matthew White	1,949	66.6	+5.2
Green	Lucy Craig	397	13.6	−4.3
Green	Raymundo Obedencio	353	12.1	−2.7
Conservative	Charles Everett	269	9.2	−1.5
Conservative	Roger Bradley	266	9.1	+0.3
Green	Eric Bateson	258	8.8	−5.0
Liberal Democrats	Lydia Hirst	254	8.7	+2.0
Conservative	Simon Hall	248	8.5	+0.3
Liberal Democrats	Adam Perry	186	6.4	+0.8
Liberal Democrats	Paul Negus	173	5.9	+1.0
Turnout		2,940	31.35	+0.89
Labour hold		Swing		
Labour hold		Swing		
Labour hold		Swing		

=== Crouch End ===
Crouch End (3)
Party	Candidate	Votes	%	±%
Liberal Democrats	Dawn Barnes	2,200	48.5	+16.4
Liberal Democrats	Luke Cawley-Harrison	2,101	46.3	+20.0
Liberal Democrats	Tammy Palmer	1,920	42.3	+16.0
Labour	Charley Allan	1,700	37.5	+2.8
Labour	Annette Baker	1,660	36.6	+2.3
Labour	Will Armston-Sheret	1,617	35.7	+5.8
Green	Rachel Aveyard	517	11.4	−9.1
Green	Greta Sykes	393	8.7	−8.2
Green	David Norwood	333	7.3	−8.4
Conservative	Lucy Clark	307	6.8	−3.2
Conservative	Chris Clark	296	6.5	−3.0
Conservative	Julian Sherwood	275	6.1	−5.0
Turnout		4,543	48.93	+5.15
Liberal Democrats gain from Labour		Swing		
Liberal Democrats gain from Labour		Swing		
Liberal Democrats hold		Swing		

=== Fortis Green ===
Fortis Green (3)
Party	Candidate	Votes	%	±%
Liberal Democrats	Viv Ross*	2,078	47.7	+13.2
Liberal Democrats	Sakina Chenot	1,989	45.7	+8.9
Liberal Democrats	Justin Hinchcliffe	1,939	44.5	+14.4
Labour	Anna Lawton	1,702	39.1	+6.5
Labour	Marta de la Vega	1,566	36.0	+4.6
Labour	Jessica Tabois	1,486	34.1	+3.7
Green	Nancy Hocking	441	10.1	−6.2
Conservative	Helen Egford	340	7.8	−5.4
Conservative	Kay Curtis	320	7.3	−4.6
Conservative	Loretta Mahmud	319	7.3	−4.5
Green	Nadja von Massow	290	6.7	−6.5
Green	Malcolm Powell	258	5.9	−9.0
Turnout		4,368	48.29	+5.88
Liberal Democrats hold		Swing		
Liberal Democrats hold		Swing		
Liberal Democrats gain from Labour		Swing		

=== Harringay ===
Harringay (3)
Party	Candidate	Votes	%	±%
Labour	Gina Adamou*	2,144	57.9	+12.2
Labour	Sarah James	2,007	54.2	+16.4
Labour	Zena Brabazon*	1,989	53.7	+16.5
Liberal Democrats	Karen Alexander	1,105	29.8	−2.3
Liberal Democrats	David Schmitz	999	27.0	−3.9
Liberal Democrats	Matthew Cuthbert	897	24.2	+0.4
Green	Rejane Cadorel	391	10.6	−7.2
Green	Jon Sen	347	9.4	−5.7
Green	Tristan Smith	320	8.6	−6.9
Conservative	Christopher Lane	166	4.5	−1.4
Conservative	John Morgan	154	4.2	−1.6
Conservative	Demetrios Savvides	140	3.8	−1.6
Duma Polska	Regina Roszczynska	58	1.6	N/A
Duma Polska	Pawel Lemanowicz	53	1.4	N/A
Turnout		3,715	42.01	+1.49
Labour hold		Swing		
Labour hold		Swing		
Labour hold		Swing		

=== Highgate ===
Highgate (3)
Party	Candidate	Votes	%	±%
Liberal Democrats	Liz Morris*	2,041	54.7	+16.9
Liberal Democrats	Bob Hare*	1,951	52.3	+18.4
Liberal Democrats	Paul Dennison	1,844	49.5	+18.1
Labour	Jean Brown	1,137	30.5	+1.7
Labour	Gareth Morgan	1,011	27.1	+1.7
Labour	Mark Streather	999	26.8	+3.1
Conservative	William MacDougall	412	11.0	−13.6
Conservative	Tom Waterton-Smith	369	9.9	−14.4
Green	Linda Leroy	350	9.4	−5.5
Conservative	Kieran Marriott	329	8.8	−14.1
Green	Izzy Rogers	303	8.1	−3.5
Green	Alex Rendall	210	5.6	−5.6
Turnout		3,736	44.94	+1.23
Liberal Democrats hold		Swing		
Liberal Democrats hold		Swing		
Liberal Democrats hold		Swing		

=== Hornsey ===
Hornsey (3)
Party	Candidate	Votes	%	±%
Labour	Adam Jogee*	2,451	61.3	+13.7
Labour	Dana Carlin	2,447	61.2	+15.5
Labour	Elin Weston*	2,304	57.6	+13.0
Liberal Democrats	Gillian Kilby	892	22.3	−6.0
Liberal Democrats	Jim Jenks	785	19.6	−11.3
Liberal Democrats	Paul Secher	687	17.2	−12.2
Green	Mary Hogan	496	12.4	−1.5
Green	Peter Budge	414	10.4	−2.3
Green	Culann Walsh	334	8.4	−2.4
Conservative	Guy Carter	284	7.1	+1.1
Conservative	Peter Forrest	265	6.6	+1.7
Conservative	Peter Gilbert	250	6.3	+1.8
Turnout		4,004	42.88	−1.89
Labour hold		Swing		
Labour hold		Swing		
Labour hold		Swing		

=== Muswell Hill ===
Muswell Hill (3)
Party	Candidate	Votes	%	±%
Liberal Democrats	Pippa Connor*	2,130	48.5	+10.1
Liberal Democrats	Scott Emery	1,956	44.6	+6.6
Liberal Democrats	Julia Ogiehor	1,944	44.3	+8.7
Labour Co-op	Emma Whysall	1,695	38.6	+5.4
Labour Co-op	Frank Hobson	1,648	37.6	+0.6
Labour Co-op	Peter Chalk	1,600	36.5	+5.4
Green	Jacqueline Ashworth	440	10.0	−6.1
Green	Joyce Rosser	401	9.1	−7.6
Green	Sam Hall	371	8.5	−7.1
Conservative	Rod Allen	260	5.9	−5.3
Conservative	Catherine MacDougall	246	5.6	−3.9
Conservative	Laurence Pearce	232	5.3	−3.7
Turnout		4,396	53.49	+4.64
Liberal Democrats hold		Swing		
Liberal Democrats hold		Swing		
Liberal Democrats gain from Labour		Swing		

=== Noel Park ===
Noel Park (3)
Party	Candidate	Votes	%	±%
Labour	Peray Ahmet*	1,938	64.6	+5.2
Labour	Emine Ibrahim**	1,906	63.5	+6.9
Labour	Khaled Moyeed	1,765	58.8	+3.0
Liberal Democrats	Pamela Willis	467	15.6	+0.1
Liberal Democrats	John Harper	460	15.3	−0.1
Liberal Democrats	Derin Adebiyi	435	14.5	+0.8
Green	Victoria Elliott	350	11.7	−4.1
Conservative	Mike Burgess	294	9.8	+3.1
Green	Mike McGowan	294	9.8	−0.6
Conservative	Valerie Clayton	247	8.2	+1.6
Green	Jordan Rapaport	214	7.1	−2.6
Conservative	Edward McRandal	192	6.4	+1.3
Turnout		3,013	32.62	−0.98
Labour hold		Swing		
Labour hold		Swing		
Labour hold		Swing		

Emine Ibrahim was a sitting councillor in Harringay ward

=== Northumberland Park ===
Northumberland Park (3)
Party	Candidate	Votes	%	±%
Labour	John Bevan*	2,188	78.5	+16.9
Labour	Kaushika Amin*	2,098	75.3	+13.5
Labour	Sheila Peacock*	2,036	73.1	+6.7
Conservative	Baran Yazgili	173	6.2	−2.0
Green	Joanne Fry	170	6.1	−4.4
Conservative	Massimo Rossi	166	6.0	−0.8
Conservative	Eva Ostrowski	162	5.8	−0.5
Green	Emily Darko	156	5.6	−0.5
Green	Kenneth Edwards	149	5.3	−0.6
Liberal Democrats	Clive Carter**	147	5.3	+0.7
Liberal Democrats	Valerie Mortimer	110	3.9	−0.7
Liberal Democrats	Brian Haley	107	3.8	+0.5
English Democrat	Janus Polenceusz	46	1.7	N/A
English Democrat	Max Spencer	41	1.5	N/A
Turnout		2,793	29.98	−2.01
Labour hold		Swing		
Labour hold		Swing		
Labour hold		Swing		

Clive Carter was a sitting councillor in Highgate ward

=== Seven Sisters ===
Seven Sisters (3)
Party	Candidate	Votes	%	±%
Labour	Barbara Blake**	2,306	68.0	+9.7
Labour	Dhiren Basu*	2,225	65.6	+6.9
Labour	Erdal Dogan	2,121	62.5	+4.7
Conservative	Anna Piasecka	441	13.0	+1.1
Conservative	Stephen Noble	429	12.6	+1.5
Conservative	Brian Fox	400	11.8	+1.5
Green	David Bennie	399	11.8	−4.8
Green	Desmond Gilmartin	287	8.5	−5.9
Green	Ronald Stewart	272	8.0	−5.0
Liberal Democrats	Pauline Wearden	155	4.6	−0.4
Liberal Democrats	Richard Siemicki	151	4.5	+0.3
TUSC	Karen Tate	130	3.8	−3.0
TUSC	Nick Auvache	124	3.6	−1.3
Liberal Democrats	Joshua Weinstein	119	3.5	+0.6
TUSC	David Kaplan	118	3.5	N/A
Turnout		3,411	31.76	−5.21
Labour hold		Swing		
Labour hold		Swing		
Labour hold		Swing		

Barbara Blake was a sitting councillor for St Ann's ward.

=== St Ann's ===
St Ann's (3)
Party	Candidate	Votes	%	±%
Labour	Julie Davis	2,042	63.5	+5.0
Labour	Mike Hakata	1,756	54.6	+6.4
Labour	Noah Tucker*	1,752	54.5	+6.8
Green	Ann Clark	924	28.7	+4.5
Green	Jarelle Francis	801	24.9	+8.0
Green	Lee Jerome	704	21.9	+6.0
Conservative	Catherine El Gamry	230	7.2	−0.8
Liberal Democrats	Mark Alexander	207	6.4	−1.4
Liberal Democrats	Sara Beynon	203	6.3	−0.6
Conservative	Daniel El Gamry	203	6.3	+0.1
Conservative	Caesar Lalobo	164	5.1	−0.5
Liberal Democrats	Adrian Woodhead	138	4.3	−2.4
Independent	Andrew Reid	120	3.7	−3.8
Turnout		3,226	34.59	+2.09
Labour hold		Swing		
Labour hold		Swing		
Labour hold		Swing		

=== Stroud Green ===
Stroud Green (3)
Party	Candidate	Votes	%	±%
Labour	Kirsten Hearn*	2,431	58.5	+15.9
Labour	Eldridge Culverwell	2,378	57.2	+14.7
Labour	Daniel Stone	2,126	51.2	+15.1
Liberal Democrats	Elizabeth Payne	1,003	24.1	−7.6
Liberal Democrats	Jeremy Cunnington	977	23.5	−6.6
Liberal Democrats	Alexander Sweet	922	22.2	−7.5
Green	Melissa Guest	685	16.5	−3.2
Green	Jack Callen	560	13.5	−4.0
Green	Alfred Jahn	353	8.5	−8.3
Conservative	Vicki Carver	242	5.8	±0.0
Conservative	Suraj Bhanot	228	5.5	±0.0
Conservative	Mark Wills	224	5.4	−0.1
CPA	Helen Spiby-Vann	67	1.6	N/A
Turnout		4,175	46.64	+0.79
Labour hold		Swing		
Labour hold		Swing		
Labour hold		Swing		

=== Tottenham Green ===
Tottenham Green (3)
Party	Candidate	Votes	%	±%
Labour	Isidoros Diakides*	2,432	72.7	+14.8
Labour	Makbule Gunes*	2,342	70.0	+12.5
Labour	Preston Tabois	2,306	69.0	+13.3
Green	Cecily Spelling	431	12.9	−6.7
Green	Rosa Fass	420	12.6	−4.9
Conservative	Daniel Babis	266	8.0	−3.2
Conservative	Jeannette Pinnock	241	7.2	−1.1
Liberal Democrats	Henry Fisher	234	7.0	+0.1
Green	Eva Weitsch	231	6.9	−6.6
Liberal Democrats	Elena Sandrini	228	6.8	+1.4
Conservative	Matt Jama	214	6.4	−0.6
Liberal Democrats	Nigel Scott	177	5.3	+0.2
Federalist	Alex Gunter	44	1.3	N/A
Turnout		3,351	31.31	−0.59
Labour hold		Swing		
Labour hold		Swing		
Labour hold		Swing		

=== Tottenham Hale ===
Tottenham Hale (3)
Party	Candidate	Votes	%	±%
Labour	Ruth Gordon	2,605	77.1	+7.6
Labour	Vincent Carroll*	2,472	73.2	+5.5
Labour	Reg Rice*	2,347	69.5	+6.7
Conservative	Christine Allicock	316	9.4	−1.0
Conservative	Mike Moss	290	8.6	−1.3
Green	David Newbury	282	8.3	−6.8
Green	Thomas Spencer	268	7.9	−2.7
Conservative	Hammad Baig	250	7.4	−0.7
Green	Elizabeth Scurfield	226	6.7	−2.6
Liberal Democrats	Georgia May	196	5.8	−0.3
Liberal Democrats	Matthew Amos	195	5.8	±0.0
Liberal Democrats	Samuel Payne	144	4.3	−0.9
Duma Polska	Dorota Lopatynska-de-Slepowron	84	2.5	N/A
Turnout		3,391	30.87	−0.96
Labour hold		Swing		
Labour hold		Swing		
Labour hold		Swing		

=== West Green ===
West Green (3)
Party	Candidate	Votes	%	±%
Labour	Mahir Demir	2,077	66.6	+8.6
Labour	Sarah Williams	2,072	66.5	+8.8
Labour	Ishmael Osamor	1,899	60.9	+5.6
Green	Hero Bennett	437	14.0	−0.8
Conservative	Sharon Cronin	292	9.4	−3.1
Liberal Democrats	Katherine Hamilton	277	8.9	+1.1
Green	Mike King	272	8.7	−3.1
Green	George Mackie	270	8.7	−1.9
Conservative	Benjamin Woodhead	266	8.5	−2.1
Liberal Democrats	Will Chan	254	8.1	+1.1
Conservative	Mitty Ragnuth	231	7.4	−2.0
Liberal Democrats	Thibaud Lecluse	214	7.4	+1.6
Independent	Michael Opoku-Brobbey	167	5.4	N/A
Turnout		3,137	38.73	+4.99
Labour hold		Swing		
Labour hold		Swing		
Labour hold		Swing		

=== White Hart Lane ===
White Hart Lane (3)
Party	Candidate	Votes	%	±%
Labour	Charles Adje*	2,094	75.1	+15.4
Labour	Gideon Bull*	2,074	74.4	+11.3
Labour	Anne Stennett*	1,981	71.0	+18.9
Conservative	Margaret Bradley	324	11.6	+1.3
Conservative	Hazel Stokes	255	9.1	−0.7
Conservative	Neil O'Shea	246	8.8	−0.6
Green	Pamela Harling	199	7.1	−0.8
Green	Friedrich Ernst	177	6.3	−2.9
Green	Dennis Bury	155	5.6	−0.5
Liberal Democrats	Paul Head	112	4.0	−3.5
Liberal Democrats	Jean-Philippe Chenot	109	3.9	−1.8
Liberal Democrats	Cara Jenkinson	100	3.6	−1.0
Democrats and Veterans	Neville Watson	31	1.1	N/A
Turnout		2,795	31.01	−1.88
Labour hold		Swing		
Labour hold		Swing		
Labour hold		Swing		

=== Woodside ===
Woodside (3)
Party	Candidate	Votes	%	±%
Labour	Peter Mitchell*	2,122	64.3	+2.6
Labour	Mark Blake**	2,106	63.8	+4.3
Labour	Lucia das Neves	2,057	62.3	+5.3
Liberal Democrats	Petros Christoforou	502	15.2	+2.4
Liberal Democrats	Angela Kawa	452	13.7	+1.7
Liberal Democrats	Paul Strang	426	12.9	+1.9
Green	Ursula Bury	314	9.5	−2.9
Green	Michael James	305	9.2	−1.2
Conservative	Reece Fox	277	8.4	+0.1
Conservative	John Sparrow	249	7.5	±0.0
Conservative	Padmanie Lawtoo	237	7.2	+0.9
Green	Ivana Curcic	233	7.1	−0.7
Democrats and Veterans	Andrew Price	45	1.4	N/A
Democrats and Veterans	Cristian Scirocco	29	0.9	N/A
Democrats and Veterans	Ruth Price	28	0.8	N/A
Turnout		3,312	35.65	+0.15
Labour hold		Swing		
Labour hold		Swing		
Labour hold		Swing		

Mark Blake was a sitting councillor in Muswell Hill ward

== By-elections ==
A by-election was held in West Green ward on 13 December 2018 following the resignation of Ishmael Osamor.

West Green
Party	Candidate	Votes	%	±%
Labour	Seema Chandwani	1,273	56.6	−4.3
Liberal Democrats	Elizabeth Payne	621	27.6	+18.7
Green	Cecily Spelling	243	10.8	−3.2
Conservative	Hammad Baig	114	5.1	−4.3
Majority		652	29.0	
Turnout		2,258	24.6	−14.1
Labour hold		Swing		
