= Highgate (Haringey ward) =

- Electoral ward for the Haringey London Borough Council
- Highgate (Haringey) ward boundaries since 2022
- Borough: Haringey
- County: Greater London
- Population: 12,764 (2021) (Note: 2021 Census data reported for 2022 ward boundaries)
- Electorate: 7,880 (2022)
- Area: 2.835 square kilometres (1.095 sq mi)

Current electoral ward
- Created: 1965
- Number of members: 3
- Members: Scott Emery; Nick Da Costa; Eva Bell
- ONS code: 00APGG (2002–2022)
- GSS code: E05000272 (2002–2022); E05013592 (2022–present)

Highgate is a ward in the London Borough of Haringey, in the United Kingdom.

== Councillors ==
From creation for its first election in 1964 until 1978, the ward elected 3 councillors.

Election	Councillor	Councillor	Councillor
1964	P. P. Rigby (Con)	H. J. Worms (Con)	C. Murray (Con)
1968	P. P. Rigby (Con)	H. J. Worms (Con)	R. P. Williams (Con)
1971	P. P. Rigby (Con)	S. A. S. Whitby (Con)	R. P. Williams (Con)
1974	P. P. Rigby (Con)	S. A. S. Whitby (Con)	D. E. Whitmore (Con)

From 1978 until 2002, the ward elected 2 councillors.

Election	Councillor	Councillor
1978	Anthony Dignum (Con)	Gail Ansell (Con)
1982	Anthony Dignum (Con)	Bryan Morris (Con)
1986	Andrew Mitchell (Con)	William Blackburne (Con)
1990	Andrew Mitchell (Con)	William Blackburne (Con)
1994	Pamela Steele (Con)	Peter Forrest (Con)
1998	William MacDougall (Con)	Peter Forrest (Con)

Since 2002, the ward has elected three councillors.

Election	Councillor	Councillor	Councillor
2002	Melanie Simpson (Lib Dem)	Walter Hare (Lib Dem)	Neil Williams (Lib Dem)
2006	Justin Portess (Lib Dem)	Walter Hare (Lib Dem)	Neil Williams (Lib Dem)
2010	Rachel Allison (Lib Dem)	Walter Hare (Lib Dem)	Neil Williams (Lib Dem)
2014	Liz Morris (Lib Dem)	Walter Hare (Lib Dem)	Clive Carter (Lib Dem)
2018	Liz Morris (Lib Dem)	Walter Hare (Lib Dem)	Paul Dennison (Lib Dem)
2022	Nick Da Costa (Lib Dem)	Marsha Isilar-Gosling (Lib Dem)	Scott Emery (Lib Dem)
2026	Nick Da Costa (Lib Dem)	Eva Bell (Grn)	Scott Emery (Lib Dem)

== Elections ==
=== 2026 ===
Highgate (3)
Party	Candidate	Votes	%	±%
Liberal Democrats	Scott Emery*	1,829	37.2	−4.3
Liberal Democrats	Nick Da Costa*	1,815	36.9	−9.6
Green	Eva Bell	1,448	29.4	+5.9
Liberal Democrats	Shamim Muhammad	1,357	27.6	−15.4
Green	Max Knowles-Parr	1,186	24.1	N/A
Green	Svenja Nierwetberg	1,138	23.1	N/A
Labour	Sofia Patse	1,077	21.9	−17.5
Labour	David Talbot	1,016	20.7	−10.9
Labour	Sean Smyth	969	19.7	−11.2
Conservative	Nathan Steinberg	561	11.4	−1.9
Conservative	Catherine McQueen	555	11.3	−0.8
Conservative	Skye Phillips	479	9.7	N/A
Reform	Christian Mehl	386	7.8	N/A
Reform	Oliver Victorio	325	6.6	N/A
Reform	Shahab Mossavat	309	6.3	N/A
Turnout		4,918	50.7	+10.6
Liberal Democrats hold				
Liberal Democrats hold				
Green gain from Liberal Democrats				

- Nick Da Costa and Scott Emery were incumbent councillors for Highgate ward.

=== 2022 ===
The election took place on 5 May 2022, under new boundaries.

2022 Haringey London Borough Council election: Highgate
Party	Candidate	Votes	%	±%
Liberal Democrats	Nick da Costa	1,840	46.5	
Liberal Democrats	Marsha Isilar-Gosling	1,702	43.0	
Liberal Democrats	Scott Emery	1,641	41.5	
Labour	Maria Jennings	1,560	39.4	
Labour	Ahmed Mohammed	1,249	31.6	
Labour	Mark Grosskopf	1,223	30.9	
Green	Ian Dick	930	23.5	
Conservative	William MacDougall	527	13.3	
Conservative	Nathan Steinberg	480	12.1	
Turnout		3,958	40.06	
Liberal Democrats win (new boundaries)				
Liberal Democrats win (new boundaries)				
Liberal Democrats win (new boundaries)				

=== 2018 ===
The election took place on 3 May 2018.

2018 Haringey London Borough Council election Highgate
Party	Candidate	Votes	%	±%
Liberal Democrats	Liz Morris	2,041		
Liberal Democrats	Bob Hare	1,951		
Liberal Democrats	Paul Dennison	1,844		
Labour	Jean Brown	1,137		
Labour	Gareth Morgan	1,011		
Labour	Mark Streather	999		
Conservative	William Macdougall	412		
Conservative	Tom Waterton-Smith	369		
Green	Linda Christine Leroy	350		
Conservative	Kieran Marriott	329		
Green	Izzy Rogers	303		
Green	Alex Rendall	210		
Turnout		10,956	44.9%	
Liberal Democrats hold		Swing		
Liberal Democrats hold		Swing		
Liberal Democrats hold		Swing		

=== 2014 ===
The election took place on 22 May 2014.

Highgate
Party	Candidate	Votes	%	±%
Liberal Democrats	Liz Morris	1,372	37.8	−16.9
Liberal Democrats	Bob Hare	1,228	33.9	−11.3
Liberal Democrats	Clive Carter	1,140	31.4	−10.5
Labour	Janet Boston	1,043	28.8	+9.8
Labour	John Woolf	921	25.4	+9.4
Conservative	Antony Denyer	893	24.6	−2.3
Conservative	Kay Carter	881	24.3	±0.0
Labour	Peter Clarke	859	23.7	+8.7
Conservative	Celia Surtees	829	22.9	+0.7
Green	Alexander Lawrenson	539	14.9	+4.8
Green	Edward Milford	422	11.6	+3.3
Green	Noel Lynch	406	11.2	+3.0
Turnout		3,648	43.71	−26.8
Liberal Democrats hold		Swing		
Liberal Democrats hold		Swing		
Liberal Democrats hold		Swing		

=== 2010 ===
The election on 6 May 2010 took place on the same day as the United Kingdom general election.

2010 Haringey London Borough Council election: Highgate
Party	Candidate	Votes	%	±%
Liberal Democrats	Rachel Allison	3,166		
Liberal Democrats	Bob Hare	2,616		
Liberal Democrats	Neil Williams	2,425		
Conservative	Robin Campbell-Burt	1,559		
Conservative	Juliet Donnelly	1,405		
Conservative	Aaron Radford-Wattley	1,283		
Labour	Caroline Graham	1,099		
Labour	David Heath	928		
Labour	Vivienne Helen Manheim	867		
Green	Christopher Peter Cope	586		
Green	Lucy Julia Shanahan	483		
Green	Andy Nicolson	476		
Turnout		16,893	70.4%	
Liberal Democrats hold		Swing		
Liberal Democrats hold		Swing		
Liberal Democrats hold		Swing		

=== 2006 ===
The election took place on 4 May 2006.

=== 2002 ===
The election took place on 2 May 2002, under new boundaries.
