= Crouch End (ward) =

Electoral ward in London, England

- Electoral ward for the Haringey London Borough Council
- Borough: Haringey
- County: Greater London
- Population: 13,040 (2021)
- Major settlements: Crouch End
- Area: 1.549 km²

Current electoral ward
- Created: 1965
- Number of members: 3
- Councillors: Luke Cawley-Harrison; Fiona Orford-Williams; Imad Ahmed

Crouch End is an electoral ward in the London Borough of Haringey. The ward was first used in the 1964 elections and elects three councillors to Haringey London Borough Council.

== Geography ==
The ward is named after the suburb of Crouch End.

== Councillors ==
Election	Councillor	Councillor	Councillor
1964	B. D. Smith (Con)	L. Sussman (Con)	B. J. McBride (Con)
1968	B. D. Smith (Con)	B. G. Falk (Con)	S. A. Jones (Con)
1971	B. D. Smith (Con)	B. G. Falk (Con)	S. A. Jones (Con)
1974	B. D. Smith (Con)	B. G. Falk (Con)	W. A. Blackburne (Con)
1978	Brian Smith (Con)	Stephen Ayres (Con)	Basil Lewis (Con)
1982	Brian Smith (Con)	Stephen Ayres (Con)	Heather Thorpe (Con)
1986	Paul Loach (Lab)	Davina Cooper (Lab)	Mary Neuner (Lab)
1990	Ronald Aitken (Con)	Caroline Elderfield (Con)	Tim MacGregor (Lab)
1994	Errol Dickerson (Lab)	Charles Sharp (Lab)	Nigel Willmott (Lab)
1998	Colin Sandbach (Lab)	Charles Sharp (Lab)	Nigel Willmott (Lab)
2002	David Winskill (Lib Dem)	Ronald Aitken (Lib Dem)	Peter Floyd (Lib Dem)
2006	David Winskill (Lib Dem)	Ronald Aitken (Lib Dem)	Linda Weber (Lib Dem)
2010	David Winskill (Lib Dem)	Paul Strang (Lib Dem)	Linda Weber (Lib Dem)
2014	Jason Arthur (Lab)	Natan Doron (Lab)	Sarah Elliott (Lib Dem)
2018	Luke Cawley-Harrison (Lib Dem)	Dawn Barnes (Lib Dem)	Tammy Palmer (Lib Dem)
2022	Luke Cawley-Harrison (Lib Dem)	Cressida Johnson (Lab)	Lester Buxton (Lab)
2026	Luke Cawley-Harrison (Lib Dem)	Fiona Orford-Williams (Lib Dem)	Imad Ahmed (Lib Dem)

== Elections ==
=== 2022 ===
Crouch End (3)
Party	Candidate	Votes	%	±%
Labour	Cressida Johnson	2,278	49.7	
Labour	Lester Buxton	1,960	42.7	
Liberal Democrats	Luke Cawley-Harrison*	1,942	42.3	
Labour	David Mason	1,911	41.7	
Liberal Democrats	Elizabeth Payne	1,871	40.8	
Liberal Democrats	Josh Dixon*	1,690	36.8	
Green	Paul Wilkinson	1,095	23.9	
Conservative	David Ritchie	264	5.8	
Turnout		4,588	45.08	
Labour win (new boundaries)				
Labour win (new boundaries)				
Liberal Democrats win (new boundaries)				

=== 2026 ===
Crouch End (3)
Party	Candidate	Votes	%	±%
Liberal Democrats	Luke Cawley-Harrison	2,338	41.6	−0.7
Liberal Democrats	Fiona Orford-Williams	1,865	33.2	−7.6
Liberal Democrats	Imad Ahmed	1,846	32.9	−3.9
Labour	Cressida Johnson	1,715	30.5	−19.2
Green	Tay Quartermain	1,552	27.6	+3.7
Labour	Lester Buxton	1,542	27.4	−15.3
Labour	Niall Adams	1,511	26.9	−14.8
Green	Rimil Hembrom	1,496	26.6	N/A
Green	Dushka Wertenbaker-Man	1,397	24.9	N/A
Reform	Theodora Nathanael	248	4.4	N/A
Reform	Christian Dike	233	4.1	N/A
Conservative	Jeanne Sherwood	224	4.0	−1.8
Conservative	Julian Sherwood	221	3.9	N/A
Conservative	Ann Sinnott	183	3.3	N/A
CPA	Thomas Williams	79	1.4	N/A
Turnout		5,618	54.3	+9.2
Liberal Democrats gain from Labour				
Liberal Democrats gain from Labour				
Liberal Democrats hold				
