= Noel Park (ward) =

Electoral ward in London, England

- Electoral ward for the Haringey London Borough Council
- Borough: Haringey
- County: Greater London
- Population: 13,712 (2021)
- Major settlements: Noel Park
- Area: 1.203 km²

Current electoral ward
- Created: 1965
- Number of members: 3 (since 1978); 4 (until 1978)
- Councillors: Johann Beckford; Simon Clark; Erin Wolson

Noel Park is an electoral ward in the London Borough of Haringey. The ward was first used in the 1964 elections and elects three councillors to Haringey London Borough Council.

== Geography ==
The ward is named after the suburb of Noel Park.

== Councillors ==
Election	Councillor	Councillor	Councillor	Councillor
1964	R. G. Kendall (Lab)	C. D. Moss (Lab)	M. Skudder (Lab)	L. A. Angell (Lab)
1968	D. C. Findley (Con)	M. E. Human (Con)	S. R. Gaubert (Con)	J. R. Tarris (Con)
1971	G. W. C. Peacock (Lab)	R. A. Penton (Lab)	E. W. J. Young (Lab)	D. F. W. Billingsley (Lab)
1974	C. P. Nuttall (Lab)	M. E. Warbris (Lab)	E. W. J. Young (Lab)	A. G. Krokou (Lab)
1975 by-election	David Barlow (Lab)	M. E. Warbris (Lab)	E. W. J. Young (Lab)	A. G. Krokou (Lab)

Following the 1978 revision of ward boundaries, the ward elects 3 councillors.

Election	Councillor	Councillor	Councillor
1978	Terence O'Sullivan (Lab)	Edward Young (Lab)	Susan Scales (Lab)
1982	John Brennan (Lab)	Nigel Knowles (Lab)	Narendra Makanji (Lab)
1986	John Brennan (Lab)	Nigel Knowles (Lab)	Narendra Makanji (Lab)
1987 by-election	John Brennan (Lab)	William Golden (Con)	Narendra Makanji (Lab)
1990	Martyn Appadoo (Lab)	William Golden (Con)	Alan Dobbie (Lab)
1990 by-election	Martyn Appadoo (Lab)	Narendra Makanji (Lab)	Alan Dobbie (Lab)
1994	Martyn Appadoo (Lab)	Narendra Makanji (Lab)	Alan Dobbie (Lab)
1998	Jean Brown (Lab)	Narendra Makanji (Lab)	Abul Zaman (Lab)
2002	Jean Brown (Lab)	Narendra Makanji (Lab)	Alan Dobbie (Lab)
2006	Catherine Harris (Lib Dem)	Fiyaz Mughal (Lib Dem)	Alan Dobbie (Lab)
2010	Pauline Gibson (Lab)	James Stewart (Lab)	Alan Strickland (Lab)
2014	Peray Ahmet (Lab)	Denise Marshall (Lab)	Alan Strickland (Lab)
2015 by-election	Peray Ahmet (Lab)	Stephen Mann (Lab)	Alan Strickland (Lab)
2018	Peray Ahmet (Lab)	Emine Ibrahim (Lab)	Khalid Moyeed (Lab)
2022	Peray Ahmet (Lab)	Emine Ibrahim (Lab)	Khalid Moyeed (Lab)
2026	Johann Beckford (Grn)	Simon Clark (Grn)	Erin Wolson (Grn)

== Elections ==
=== 2026 ===
Noel Park (3)
Party	Candidate	Votes	%	±%
Green	Johann Beckford	1,582	43.7	N/A
Green	Simon Clark	1,548	42.8	N/A
Green	Erin Wolson	1,514	41.8	N/A
Labour	Peray Ahmet*	1,367	37.8	−34.1
Labour	Emine Ibrahim*	1,180	32.6	−36.3
Labour	Menha Zola	1,095	30.3	−32.9
Liberal Democrats	David Beacham	344	9.5	−10.5
Reform	Jade Blackwell	287	7.9	N/A
Reform	David Hardie	276	7.6	N/A
Conservative	Eva Kleinova	275	7.6	−4.1
Liberal Democrats	Arzu Ercan	264	7.3	−12.4
Conservative	Martyna Piadlowska	231	6.4	N/A
Liberal Democrats	Richard Mansfield	230	6.4	−12.9
Conservative	Dariusz Piadlowski	201	5.6	N/A
Turnout		3,618	35.6	+8.3
Green gain from Labour				
Green gain from Labour				
Green gain from Labour				

=== 2022 ===
Noel Park (3)
Party	Candidate	Votes	%	±%
Labour	Peray Ahmet*	1,849	71.9	
Labour	Emine Ibrahim*	1,773	68.9	
Labour	Khaled Moyeed*	1,626	63.2	
Liberal Democrats	Matthew Amos	514	20.0	
Liberal Democrats	Anthony Powell	506	19.7	
Liberal Democrats	Asha Kaur	496	19.3	
Conservative	Ben Obese-Jecty	301	11.7	
Turnout		2,573	27.34	
Labour win (new boundaries)				
Labour win (new boundaries)				
Labour win (new boundaries)				
