= Harringay (ward) =

- Electoral ward for the Haringey London Borough Council
- Harringay ward boundaries since 2022
- Borough: Haringey
- County: Greater London
- Population: 14,567 (2021) (Note: 2021 Census data reported for 2022 ward boundaries)
- Electorate: 9,866 (2022)
- Major settlements: Harringay
- Area: 1.590 square kilometres (0.614 sq mi)

Current electoral ward
- Created: 1978
- Number of members: 3
- Members: Jo Kuper; Rosie Latchford; Marc Jenner

Harringay is an electoral ward in the London Borough of Haringey. The ward has existed since 1978 and was first used in the 1978 elections. It returns councillors to Haringey London Borough Council.

== Councillors ==
Election	Councillor	Councillor	Councillor
1978	Jeremy Corbyn (Lab)	Charles Silverstone (Lab)	Ronald Blanchard (Lab)
1982	Jeremy Corbyn (Lab)	Christakis Zissimos (Lab)	Ronald Blanchard (Lab)
1983 by-election	Donald Billingsley (Lab)	Christakis Zissimos (Lab)	Ronald Blanchard (Lab)
1986	Sharon Lawrence (Lab)	Christakis Zissimos (Lab)	Ronald Blanchard (Lab)
1990	Gina Adamou (Lab)	Christakis Zissimos (Lab)	Ronald Blanchard (Lab)
1994	Gina Adamou (Lab)	Peter Daly (Lab)	Ronald Blanchard (Lab)
1998	Gina Adamou (Lab)	Takki Sulaiman (Lab)	Ronald Blanchard (Lab)
2002	Gina Adamou (Lab)	Takki Sulaiman (Lab)	Ronald Blanchard (Lab)
2006	Gina Adamou (Lab)	Karen Alexander (Lib Dem)	Carolyn Baker (Lib Dem)
2010	Gina Adamou (Lab)	Karen Alexander (Lib Dem)	David Schmitz (Lib Dem)
2014	Gina Adamou (Lab)	James Ryan (Lab)	Emine Ibrahim (Lab)
2018	Gina Adamou (Lab)	Zena Brabazon (Lab)	Sarah James (Lab)
2022	Gina Adamou (Lab)	Zena Brabazon (Lab)	Anna Abela (Lab)
2026	Jo Kuper (Grn)	Rosie Latchford (Grn)	Marc Jenner (Grn)

== Elections ==
=== 2026 election ===
The election took place on 7 May 2026.

Harringay (3)
Party	Candidate	Votes	%	±%
Green	Jo Kuper	2,458	51.1	+27.3
Green	Rosie Latchford	2,457	51.1	N/A
Green	Marc Jenner	2,408	50.1	N/A
Labour Co-op	Anna Abela	1,621	33.7	−19.2
Labour Co-op	Zena Brabazon	1,404	29.2	−20.7
Labour Co-op	Olly Bennathan	1,360	28.3	−21.5
Liberal Democrats	Karen Alexander	531	11.0	−22.0
Liberal Democrats	David Schmitz	500	10.4	−18.3
Liberal Democrats	Dom Gibson	386	8.0	−17.8
Conservative	Juliet Donnelly	215	4.5	−0.3
Reform	Rosemary Parry	199	4.1	N/A
Conservative	Jonathan Thornton	190	4.0	−0.5
Conservative	Lili Shtipska	173	3.6	−0.4
TUSC	Nick Davies	68	1.4	N/A
Turnout		4,807	46.9	+9.7
Green gain from Labour				
Green gain from Labour				
Green gain from Labour				

There was a revision of ward boundaries in Haringey in 2022.

=== 2022 election ===
The election took place on 5 May 2022.

2022 Haringey London Borough Council election: Harringay (3)
Party	Candidate	Votes	%	±%
Labour	Anna Abela	1,941	52.9	
Labour	Gina Adamou	1,832	49.9	
Labour	Zena Brabazon	1,829	49.8	
Liberal Democrats	Karen Alexander	1,210	33.0	
Liberal Democrats	David Schmitz	1,055	28.7	
Liberal Democrats	Ryan Mercer	948	25.8	
Green	Adam Frantzis	874	23.8	
Women's Equality	Sarah Mills	382	10.4	
Conservative	William Hull	176	4.8	
Conservative	Nihat Donmez	167	4.5	
Conservative	Jethro Rasmussen	146	4.0	
Turnout		3,672	37.22	
Labour win (new boundaries)				
Labour win (new boundaries)				
Labour win (new boundaries)				

== 2002–2022 Haringey council elections ==
Harringay ward boundaries from 2002 to 2022

There was a revision of ward boundaries in Haringey in 2002.

=== 2018 election ===
The election took place on 3 May 2018.

2018 Haringey London Borough Council election: Harringay (3)
Party	Candidate	Votes	%	±%
Labour	Gina Adamou	2,144	57.9	+12.2
Labour	Sarah James	2,007	54.2	+16.4
Labour	Zena Brabazon	1,989	53.7	+16.5
Liberal Democrats	Karen Alexander	1,105	29.8	−2.3
Liberal Democrats	David Schmitz	999	27.0	−3.9
Liberal Democrats	Matthew Cuthbert	897	24.2	+0.4
Green	Rejane Cadorel	391	10.6	−7.2
Green	Jon Sen	347	9.4	−5.7
Green	Tristan James Law Smith	320	8.6	−6.9
Conservative	Christopher Alan Lane	166	4.5	−1.4
Conservative	John James Morgan	154	4.2	−1.6
Conservative	Demetrios Panayi Savvides	140	3.8	−1.6
Duma Polska	Regina Roszczynska	58	1.6	N/A
Duma Polska	Pawel Rafal Lemanowicz	53	1.4	N/A
Turnout		3,715	42.01	+1.49
Labour hold		Swing		
Labour hold		Swing		
Labour hold		Swing		

=== 2016 by-election ===
A by-election was held on 28 July 2016.

2016 Harringay by-election
Party	Candidate	Votes	%	±%
Labour	Zena Brabazon	1,054	46.2	+8.4
Liberal Democrats	Karen Alexander	765	33.6	+1.5
Green	Jarelle Francis	325	14.3	−3.5
Conservative	Cansoy Elmaz	99	4.3	−1.6
UKIP	Neville Watson	36	1.6	N/A
Majority		289	12.6	
Turnout		2,282	24.9	−15.6
Labour hold		Swing		

=== 2014 election ===
The election took place on 22 May 2014.

2014 Haringey London Borough Council election: Harringay (3)
Party	Candidate	Votes	%	±%
Labour	Gina Adamou	1,683	45.7	+4.0
Labour	James Ryan	1,395	37.8	−0.3
Labour	Emine Ibrahim	1,372	37.2	+6.3
Liberal Democrats	Karen Alexander	1,182	32.1	−10.8
Liberal Democrats	David Schmitz	1,139	30.9	−7.4
Liberal Democrats	Asha Kaur	878	23.8	−10.9
Green	Matthew Cuthbert	657	17.8	+6.2
Green	Tristan Smith	572	15.5	+8.4
Green	Kerry Smith-Jefferys	558	15.1	+4.4
TUSC	David Kaplan	219	5.9	N/A
Conservative	Sean Rivers	219	5.9	−2.7
Conservative	Lydia Rivlin	212	5.8	−2.6
Conservative	Massimo Rossini	200	5.4	−2.5
TUSC	Patrick Burland	165	4.5	N/A
TUSC	Kan Patel	132	3.6	N/A
Turnout		3,701	40.52	−19.0
Labour hold		Swing		
Labour gain from Liberal Democrats		Swing		
Labour gain from Liberal Democrats		Swing		

=== 2010 election ===
The election on 6 May 2010 took place on the same day as the United Kingdom general election.

2010 Haringey London Borough Council election: Harringay (3)
Party	Candidate	Votes	%	±%
Liberal Democrats	Karen Alexander	2,224	42.9	−1.2
Labour	Gina Adamou	2,159	41.7	−0.6
Liberal Democrats	David Schmitz	1,987	38.3	+2.1
Labour	Nora Mulready	1,974	38.1	+2.1
Liberal Democrats	Chris Ford	1,800	34.7	−4.4
Labour	Jon Vellapah	1,601	30.9	−3.6
Green	Rebecca Bunting	602	11.6	±0.0
Green	Kerry Smith-Jefferys	555	10.7	−0.9
Conservative	Tim Caines	447	8.6	+2.3
Conservative	Christine Allicock	435	8.4	+2.9
Conservative	Stephen Noble	407	7.9	+2.8
Green	Karis Tanner	368	7.1	−4.3
Independent	Matt Cuthbert	292	5.6	N/A
Turnout		5,208	59.5	+22.9
Liberal Democrats hold		Swing		
Labour hold		Swing		
Liberal Democrats hold		Swing		

=== 2006 election ===
The election took place on 4 May 2006.

Harringay (3)
Party	Candidate	Votes	%	±%
Liberal Democrats	Karen Alexander	1,308	44.1	+25.4
Labour	Gina Adamou	1,254	42.3	−7.2
Liberal Democrats	Carolyn Baker	1,159	39.1	+26.1
Liberal Democrats	David Schmitz	1,075	36.2	+24.7
Labour	Alpha Kane	1,068	36.0	−6.4
Labour	Takki Sulaiman*	1,024	34.5	−6.7
Green	Matthew Pollitt	345	11.6	−8.6
Green	Peter Polycarpou	343	11.6	−5.9
Green	Peter McAskie	339	11.4	−3.7
Conservative	Kshitis Das	187	6.3	−12.1
Conservative	Peter Gilbert	163	5.5	−14.1
Conservative	Sally Lumb	152	5.1	−9.8
Turnout		2,979	36.6	+10.7
Liberal Democrats gain from Labour		Swing		
Labour hold		Swing		
Liberal Democrats gain from Labour		Swing		

=== 2002 election ===
The election took place on 2 May 2002.

2002 Haringey London Borough Council election: Harringay (3)
Party	Candidate	Votes	%	±%
Labour	Gina Adamou	1,014	49.5	
Labour	Ronald Blanchard	869	42.4	
Labour	Takki Sulaiman	844	41.2	
Green	Judy Gahagan	413	20.2	
Conservative	Hasan Bilginer	401	19.6	
Liberal Democrats	David Bartlett	383	18.7	
Conservative	Kshitis Das	376	18.4	
Green	Peter Budge	359	17.5	
Green	Adam Dorken	306	14.9	
Conservative	Nityanand Ragnuth	306	14.9	
Liberal Democrats	David Oxford	267	13.0	
Liberal Democrats	Marcus Speer	235	11.5	
Turnout		2,058	25.9	
Labour win (new boundaries)				
Labour win (new boundaries)				
Labour win (new boundaries)				

== 1978–2002 Haringey council elections ==
Harringay ward boundaries from 1978 to 2002

There was a revision of ward boundaries in Haringey in 1978.

=== 1998 election ===
The election took place on 7 May 1998.

1998 Haringey London Borough Council election: Harringay (3)
Party	Candidate	Votes	%	±%
Labour	Gina Adamou	1,288	60.8	−10.9
Labour	Ronald Blanchard	1,169	55.2	−13.0
Labour	Takki Sulaiman	1,032	48.7	−20.7
Green	Robert Kozma	448	21.2	N/A
Liberal Democrats	Josina van der Valk	423	20.0	+7.0
Conservative	Betty Cooper	310	14.6	−0.1
Socialist Labour	Warren Taylor	277	13.1	N/A
Conservative	Kenneth King	265	12.5	+0.4
Turnout		2,141	28.6	−11.4
Labour hold		Swing		
Labour hold		Swing		
Labour hold		Swing		

=== 1994 election ===
The election took place on 5 May 1994.

1994 Haringey London Borough Council election: Harringay (3)
Party	Candidate	Votes	%	±%
Labour	Gina Adamou	1,913	71.7	+12.5
Labour	Peter Daly	1,852	69.4	+16.3
Labour	Ronald Blanchard	1,821	68.2	+5.8
Conservative	Doris Berry	392	14.7	−12.2
Conservative	Ann Harvey-Kirkwood	363	13.6	−12.4
Liberal Democrats	Jeanette Jamieson	347	13.0	+4.4
Conservative	Kenneth King	324	12.1	−12.9
Liberal Democrats	Martin Palmer	292	10.9	N/A
Turnout		2,682	40.0	+3.2
Labour hold		Swing		
Labour hold		Swing		
Labour hold		Swing		

=== 1990 election ===
The election took place on 3 May 1990.

1990 Haringey London Borough Council election: Harringay (3)
Party	Candidate	Votes	%	±%
Labour	Ronald Blanchard	1,709	62.4	+7.7
Labour	Gina Adamides	1,622	59.2	+5.3
Labour	Chris Zissimos	1,454	53.1	+3.7
Conservative	Sheila Cheetham	737	26.9	+6.1
Conservative	Kenneth Mansfield	713	26.0	+5.4
Conservative	Christine Sampson	685	25.0	+2.1
Green	Elizabeth Crosbie	510	18.6	+12.6
Liberal Democrats	Lily Roberts	236	8.6	−2.9
Turnout		2,749	36.8	−4.5
Labour hold		Swing		
Labour hold		Swing		
Labour hold		Swing		

=== 1986 election ===
The election took place on 8 May 1986.

1986 Haringey London Borough Council election: Harringay (3)
Party	Candidate	Votes	%	±%
Labour	Ronald Blanchard	1,827	54.7	+0.3
Labour	Sharon Lawrence	1,799	53.9	−3.9
Labour	Chris Zissimos	1,651	49.4	−4.8
Conservative	Christine Sampson	766	22.9	+1.8
Conservative	Ines Demopoulos	696	20.8	−0.1
Conservative	Zerin Ahmed	688	20.6	−0.1
Alliance (SDP)	Pamela Sweeney	384	11.5	−4.1
Alliance (SDP)	Wendy Beauchamp-Ward	377	11.3	−2.9
Alliance (SDP)	David Withey	329	9.9	−3.3
Green	David Crucefix	199	6.0	N/A
Communist	Francis Carr	193	5.8	−0.2
United Independent Group	Themis Demetriou	105	3.1	N/A
Humanist	Brian Easton	47	1.4	N/A
Turnout		3,340	41.3	−1.1
Labour hold		Swing		
Labour hold		Swing		
Labour hold		Swing		

=== 1983 by-election ===
A by-election was held on 20 October 1983, following the resignation of Jeremy Corbyn.

1983 Harringay by-election
Party	Candidate	Votes	%	±%
Labour	Donald Billingsley	1,345	55.2	−2.6
Conservative	Christine Sampson	749	30.7	+9.6
Alliance	Kevin Twaite	344	14.1	−1.5
Turnout			34.8	
Labour hold		Swing		

=== 1982 election ===
The election took place on 6 May 1982.

1982 Haringey London Borough Council election: Harringay (3)
Party	Candidate	Votes	%	±%
Labour	Jeremy Corbyn	1,839	57.8	+4.6
Labour	Ronald Blanchard	1,731	54.4	+3.6
Labour	Christakis Zissimos	1,724	54.2	−0.5
Conservative	Christakis Kavallares	673	21.1	−11.2
Conservative	Sally Lumb	664	20.9	−11.9
Conservative	Edward Webb	659	20.7	−11.8
Alliance (SDP)	Robert Burns	498	15.6	N/A
Alliance (SDP)	Nigel Gilbert	453	14.2	N/A
Alliance (Liberal)	Paul Moynagh	420	13.2	N/A
Communist	Francis Carr	190	6.0	−1.1
Turnout		3,183	42.4	+2.5
Labour hold		Swing		
Labour hold		Swing		
Labour hold		Swing		

=== 1978 election ===
The election took place on 4 May 1978.

1978 Haringey London Borough Council election: Harringay (3)
Party	Candidate	Votes	%	±%
Labour	Charles Silverstone	1,776	54.7	
Labour	Jeremy Corbyn	1,729	53.2	
Labour	Ronald Blanchard	1,651	50.8	
Conservative	Timothy Easton	1,064	32.8	
Conservative	Gerald Murphy	1,056	32.5	
Conservative	Christakis Kavallares	1,048	32.3	
Communist	Francis Carr	231	7.1	
National Front	Leslie Butler	112	3.4	
National Front	John Green	86	2.6	
National Front	Barbara Green	78	2.4	
Turnout		3,247	39.9	
Labour win (new seat)				
Labour win (new seat)				
Labour win (new seat)				
