= Fortis Green (ward) =

Electoral ward in the London Borough of Haringey

- Electoral ward for the Haringey London Borough Council
- Fortis Green ward boundaries
- Borough: Haringey
- County: Greater London
- Population: 12,598 (2021) (Note: 2021 Census data reported for 2022 ward boundaries)
- Electorate: 9,253 (2022)
- Major settlements: Fortis Green
- Area: 1.937 square kilometres (0.748 sq mi)

Current electoral ward
- Created: 1965
- Number of members: 3
- Councillors: Dawn Barnes; Michael Brookes; Daniela Parry
- GSS code: E05013589

Fortis Green is an electoral ward in the London Borough of Haringey. The ward was first used in the 1964 elections. It returns three councillors to Haringey London Borough Council. It is currently represented by Councillors Dawn Barnes, Michael Brookes and Dani Parry following their election in May 2026.

== Councillors ==
Election	Councillor	Councillor	Councillor
1964	J. T. Wilkins (Con)	H. A. L. Rossi (Con)	L. A. Bains (Con)
1968	C. Hannington (Con)	D. F. P. Rosa (Con)	C. H. Harvey (Con)
1971	C. Hannington (Con)	C. J. Levinson (Con)	G. J. Y. Murphy (Con)
1974	C. Hannington (Con)	P. A. Hodgson (Con)	G. J. Y. Murphy (Con)
1978	Christopher Hannington (Con)	Jean MacGregor (Con)	Jeffrey Lotery (Con)
1982	Christopher Hannington (Con)	Jean MacGregor (Con)	Jeffrey Lotery (Con)
1986	Roger Dix (Con)	Gerard Tyler (Con)	Jeffrey Lotery (Con)
1990	Roger Dix (Con)	Gerard Tyler (Con)	Mary Poole-Wilson (Con)
1994	Thomas Davidson (Lab)	David Billingsley (Lab)	Mavis Lambie (Lab)
1998	Alan Richardson (Lab)	Susan Eedle (Lab)	David Prendergast (Lab)
2002	Barbara Fabian (Lib Dem)	Matthew Davies (Lib Dem)	Steve Gilbert (Lib Dem)
2006	Sarah Benyon (Lib Dem)	Matthew Davies (Lib Dem)	Martin Newton (Lib Dem)
2010	Sophie Erskine (Lib Dem)	Matthew Davies (Lib Dem)	Martin Newton (Lib Dem)
2014	Viv Ross (Lib Dem)	Pat Berryman (Lab)	Martin Newton (Lib Dem)
2018	Viv Ross (Lib Dem)	Sakina Chenot (Lib Dem)	Justin Hinchcliffe (Lib Dem)
2022	Dawn Barnes (Lib Dem)	Joy Wallace (Lab)	Mark Blake (Lab)
2026	Dawn Barnes (Lib Dem)	Michael Brookes (Lab)	Daniela Parry (Lab)

== Elections ==
=== 2026 election ===
The election took place on 7 May 2026.

Fortis Green (3)
Party	Candidate	Votes	%	±%
Liberal Democrats	Dawn Barnes*	1,871	37.0	−10.1
Labour	Michael Brookes	1,712	33.9	−9.5
Labour	Daniela Parry	1,654	32.7	−8.8
Liberal Democrats	Matthew Bentham	1,573	31.1	−9.5
Labour	David Kahn	1,565	31.0	−8.3
Liberal Democrats	Viv Ross	1,427	28.3	−11.3
Green	Debbie Dixon	1,166	23.1	+2.5
Green	Greg Dryer	1,027	20.3	N/A
Green	Christyn Parkes	995	19.7	N/A
Conservative	Karin Carver	356	7.0	−0.4
Conservative	Rebecca White	338	6.7	−0.6
Reform	Jo Clark	316	6.3	N/A
Conservative	Jai Singh	311	6.2	N/A
Reform	Lidia Mihele	273	5.4	N/A
Reform	Michael Tringham	262	5.2	N/A
Turnout		5,051	53.6	+8.19
Liberal Democrats hold				
Labour hold				
Labour hold				

=== 2022 election ===
The election took place on 5 May 2022.

2022 Haringey London Borough Council election: Fortis Green (3)
Party	Candidate	Votes	%	±%
Liberal Democrats	Dawn Barnes	1,979	47.1	
Labour	Joy Wallace	1,823	43.4	
Labour	Mark Blake	1,743	41.5	
Liberal Democrats	Matthew Bentham	1,705	40.6	
Liberal Democrats	Viv Ross	1,664	39.6	
Labour	Sean O'Donovan	1,652	39.3	
Green	Colin Ettinger	865	20.6	
Conservative	Elliot Hammer	311	7.4	
Conservative	Julian Sherwood	305	7.3	
Turnout		4,202	45.41	
Liberal Democrats win (new boundaries)				
Labour win (new boundaries)				
Labour win (new boundaries)				

== 2002–2022 Haringey council elections ==
Fortis Green ward boundaries from 2002 to 2022

There was a revision of ward boundaries in Haringey in 2002.

=== 2018 election ===
The election took place on 3 May 2018.

2018 Haringey London Borough Council election: Fortis Green (3)
Party	Candidate	Votes	%	±%
Liberal Democrats	Viv Ross	2,078	47.7	+13.2
Liberal Democrats	Sakina Chenot	1,989	45.7	+8.9
Liberal Democrats	Justin Hinchcliffe	1,939	44.5	+14.4
Labour	Anna Lawton	1,702	39.1	+6.5
Labour	Marta Garcia de la Vega	1,566	36.0	+4.6
Labour	Jessica Tabois	1,486	34.1	+3.7
Green	Nancy Hocking	441	10.1	−6.2
Conservative	Helen Egford	340	7.8	−5.4
Conservative	Kay Curtis	320	7.3	−4.6
Conservative	Loretta Mahmud	319	7.3	−4.5
Green	Nadja von Massow	290	6.7	−6.5
Green	Malcolm Powell	258	5.9	−9.0
Turnout		4,368	48.29	+5.88
Liberal Democrats hold		Swing		
Liberal Democrats hold		Swing		
Liberal Democrats gain from Labour		Swing		

=== 2014 election ===
The election took place on 22 May 2014.

2014 Haringey London Borough Council election: Fortis Green (3)
Party	Candidate	Votes	%	±%
Liberal Democrats	Martin Newton	1,421	36.8	−8.0
Liberal Democrats	Viv Ross	1,331	34.5	−16.3
Labour	Patrick Berryman	1,260	32.6	+10.2
Labour	Rosemary Boughton	1,212	31.4	+9.8
Labour	James Bielby	1,173	30.4	+9.3
Liberal Democrats	Tom Southern	1,163	30.1	−16.7
Green	Nancy Hocking	631	16.3	+5.9
Green	Saul Blumberg	575	14.9	+5.1
Green	Nadja von Massow	510	13.2	+5.5
Conservative	Roderick Allen	508	13.2	−6.8
Conservative	Peter Forrest	460	11.9	−6.9
Conservative	Ezendu Ariwa	454	11.8	−5.4
Independent	Matt Davies	293	7.6	−43.2
UKIP	Rajan Adwani	191	4.9	N/A
Turnout		3,868	42.41	−27.2
Liberal Democrats hold		Swing		
Liberal Democrats hold		Swing		
Labour gain from Liberal Democrats		Swing		

=== 2010 election ===
The election on 6 May 2010 took place on the same day as the United Kingdom general election.

2010 Haringey London Borough Council election: Fortis Green (3)
Party	Candidate	Votes	%	±%
Liberal Democrats	Matt Davies	3,141	50.8	−1.1
Liberal Democrats	Sophie Erskine	2,891	46.8	−9.2
Liberal Democrats	Martin Newton	2,768	44.8	−6.5
Labour	Sue Eedle	1,382	22.4	+7.3
Labour	Matt Chorley	1,333	21.6	+6.8
Labour	Robin Dunn	1,304	21.1	+6.7
Conservative	Roderick Allen	1,233	20.0	+1.1
Conservative	Evan Price	1,163	18.8	+0.1
Conservative	Julian Sherwood	1,063	17.2	−0.2
Green	Claire Lewis	643	10.4	−2.5
Green	Kathryn Dean	606	9.8	−2.0
Green	Alex Pickering	476	7.7	−2.2
Turnout		6,212	69.6	+30.8
Liberal Democrats hold		Swing		
Liberal Democrats hold		Swing		
Liberal Democrats hold		Swing		

=== 2006 election ===
The election took place on 4 May 2006.

2006 Haringey London Borough Council election: Fortis Green (3)
Party	Candidate	Votes	%	±%
Liberal Democrats	Sara Benyon	1,855	56.0	+15.6
Liberal Democrats	Matthew Davies	1,719	51.9	+11.9
Liberal Democrats	Martin Newton	1,700	51.3	+12.0
Conservative	Patrick Cusworth	628	18.9	−11.5
Conservative	David Douglas	620	18.7	−10.9
Conservative	Gabriel Rozenberg	577	17.4	−11.9
Labour	Alexander Hughes	502	15.1	−6.5
Labour	Iquo Amaegbe	489	14.8	−5.2
Labour	Dhirendra Halder	476	14.4	−5.6
Green	Mark Caulfield	426	12.9	+1.5
Green	Daniel Rosenberg	391	11.8	+4.3
Green	Nadja von Massow	328	9.9	N/A
Turnout		3,323	38.8	−0.7
Liberal Democrats hold		Swing		
Liberal Democrats hold		Swing		
Liberal Democrats hold		Swing		

=== 2004 by-election ===
The by-election took place on 11 November 2004, following the resignation of Barbara Fabian.

2004 Fortis Green by-election
Party	Candidate	Votes	%	±%
Liberal Democrats	Martin Newton	1,345	57.8	+17.4
Conservative	Douglas McNeill	550	23.6	−6.8
Labour	Mark Atkinson	298	12.8	−8.8
Green	Peter Budge	136	5.8	−5.6
Majority		795	34.2	
Turnout		2,329	27.7	−11.8
Liberal Democrats hold		Swing		
