= Woodside (Haringey ward) =

Electoral ward in London, England

- Electoral ward for the Haringey London Borough Council
- Woodside ward boundaries since 2022
- Borough: Haringey
- County: Greater London
- Population: 15,245 (2021) (Note: 2021 Census data reported for 2022 ward boundaries)
- Electorate: 10,170 (2022)
- Major settlements: Wood Green
- Area: 1.407 km^{2} (0.543 sq mi)

Current electoral ward
- Created: 1978
- Number of members: 3
- Councillors: Lucia Das Neves; Tammy Hymas; Elara Shurety
- GSS code: E05000284 (2002–2022); E05013605 (2022–present)

Woodside is an electoral ward in the London Borough of Haringey. The ward was first used in the 1978 elections and elects three councillors to Haringey London Borough Council.

== Councillors ==
Election	Councillor	Councillor	Councillor
1978	David Billingsley (Lab)	Edward Auger (Con)	Jacqueline Goodwin (Lab)
1979 by-election	David Billingsley (Lab)	Edward Auger (Con)	Bernard Dehnel (Con)
1982	Olive Baker (Con)	Eva Robinson (Con)	Bernard Dehnel (Con)
1984 by-election	Olive Baker (Con)	Jim Gardner (Lab)	Bernard Dehnel (Con)
1986	Peter Doble (Lab)	Jim Gardner (Lab)	Bernard Dehnel (Con)
1989 by-election	Peter Doble (Lab)	Jim Gardner (Lab)	Jim Buckley (Con)
1990	Neil Rostron (Con)	Jim Gardner (Lab)	Jim Buckley (Con)
1994	Rafaat Mughal (Lab)	Jim Gardner (Lab)	Abul Nuruzzaman (Lab)
1998	Denis Dillon (Lab)	George Meehan (Lab)	Jayanti Patel (Lab)
2002	Denis Dillon (Lab)	George Meehan (Lab)	Jayanti Patel (Lab)
2006	Patrick Egan (Lab)	George Meehan (Lab)	Jayanti Patel (Lab)
2010	Patrick Egan (Lab)	George Meehan (Lab)	Ann Waters (Lab)
2014	Pat Egan (Lab)	George Meehan (Lab)	Ann Waters (Lab)
2014 by-election	Charles Wright (Lab)	George Meehan (Lab)	Ann Waters (Lab)
2015 by-election	Charles Wright (Lab)	Peter Mitchell (Lab)	Ann Waters (Lab)
2018	Lucia Das Neves (Lab)	Peter Mitchell (Lab)	Mark Blake (Lab)
2022	Lucia Das Neves (Lab)	Lotte Collett (Lab)	Thayahlan Iyngkaran (Lab)
2026	Lucia Das Neves (Lab)	Tammy Hymas (Grn)	Hasret Bozdogan (Lab)
2026 by-election	Lucia Das Neves (Lab)	Tammy Hymas (Grn)	Elara Shurety (Grn)

== Elections ==
=== 2026 by-election ===
The by-election took place on 25 June 2026, following the resignation of Hasret Bodozgan.

Woodside ward by-election, 25 June 2026
Party	Candidate	Votes	%	±%
Green	Elara Shurety	1,033	43.3	+6.0
Labour	Thayahlan Iyngkaran	978	41.0	+3.6
Reform	Ruth Price	171	7.2	−0.2
Conservative	Mikeleno Fureraj	110	4.6	−2.8
Liberal Democrats	Rakeebah Rahim	93	3.9	−7.0
Turnout		2,400	24.4	−11.9
Rejected ballots		13	0.5	
Registered electors		9,855		
Green gain from Labour				

=== 2026 election ===
The election took place on 7 May 2026.

2026 Haringey London Borough Council election: Woodside (3)
Party	Candidate	Votes	%	±%
Labour	Lucia Das Neves	1,434	40.1	−27.1
Green	Tammy Hymas	1,394	39.0	+16.0
Labour	Hasret Bodozgan	1,337	37.4	−29.9
Green	Hayley Jukes	1,334	37.3	N/A
Green	Sumrah Mohammed	1,158	32.4	N/A
Labour	Thayahlan Iyngkaran	1,151	32.2	−25.2
Liberal Democrats	Marsha Isilar-Gosling	388	10.9	−3.8
Liberal Democrats	Nigel Scott	355	9.9	−4.4
Conservative	Rita Hand	316	8.8	−3.3
Liberal Democrats	Keshon Smith	293	8.2	−4.8
Reform	Ruth Price	266	7.4	N/A
Conservative	Mikeleno Fureraj	264	7.4	−2.0
Conservative	Neil O'Shea	246	6.9	N/A
Reform	Ciprian Mihele	240	6.7	N/A
Reform	Da Wei	200	5.6	N/A
Turnout		3,572	36.3	+6.0
Labour hold		Swing		
Green gain from Labour		Swing		
Labour hold		Swing		

=== 2022 election ===
The election took place on 5 May 2022.

2022 Haringey London Borough Council election: Woodside (3)
Party	Candidate	Votes	%	±%
Labour	Lotte Collett	2,077	67.3	
Labour	Lucia Das Neves	2,073	67.2	
Labour	Thayahlan Iyngkaran	1,770	57.4	
Green	Jarelle Francis	711	23.0	
Liberal Democrats	Sam Fisk	454	14.7	
Liberal Democrats	Shelley Salter	440	14.3	
Liberal Democrats	Paul Negus	402	13.0	
Conservative	Eva Carr	373	12.1	
Conservative	Shanuk Mediwaka	291	9.4	
Turnout		3,085	30.33	
Labour win (new boundaries)				
Labour win (new boundaries)				
Labour win (new boundaries)				

== 2002–2022 Haringey council elections ==
There was a revision of ward boundaries in Haringey in 2002.

=== 2018 election ===
The election took place on 3 May 2018.

2018 Haringey London Borough Council election: Woodside (3)
Party	Candidate	Votes	%	±%
Labour	Peter Mitchell	2,122	64.3	+2.6
Labour	Mark Blake	2,106	63.8	+4.3
Labour	Lucia Das Neves	2,057	62.3	+5.3
Liberal Democrats	Petros Christoforou	502	15.2	+2.4
Liberal Democrats	Angela Kawa	452	13.7	+1.7
Liberal Democrats	Paul Strang	426	12.9	+1.9
Green	Ursula Bury	314	9.5	−2.9
Green	Michael James	305	9.2	−1.2
Conservative	Reece Fox	277	8.4	+0.1
Conservative	John Sparrow	249	7.5	±0.0
Conservative	Padmanie Lawtoo	237	7.2	+0.9
Green	Ivana Curcic	233	7.1	−0.7
Democrats and Veterans	Andrew Price	45	1.4	N/A
Democrats and Veterans	Cristian Scirocco	29	0.9	N/A
Democrats and Veterans	Ruth Price	28	0.8	N/A
Turnout		3,312	35.65	+0.15
Labour hold		Swing		
Labour hold		Swing		
Labour hold		Swing		

=== 2015 election ===
The by-election took place on 17 September 2015, following the death of George Meehan.

2015 Woodside by-election
Party	Candidate	Votes	%	±%
Labour	Peter Mitchell	1,279	61.7	±0.0
Liberal Democrats	Jenni Hollis	435	21.0	+8.2
Conservative	Robert Broadhurst	141	6.8	−1.5
Green	Annette Baker	122	5.9	−6.5
UKIP	Andrew Price	95	4.6	−3.3
Majority		844	40.7	
Turnout		2,076	23.0	−12.0
Labour hold		Swing		

=== 2014 by-election ===
The by-election took place on 2 October 2014, following the death of Patrick Egan.

2014 Woodside by-election
Party	Candidate	Votes	%	±%
Labour	Charles Wright	1,331	56.3	−3.2
Liberal Democrats	Dawn Barnes	482	20.4	+7.6
Green	Tom Davidson	191	8.1	−4.3
UKIP	Andrew Price	161	6.8	−1.1
Conservative	Scott Green	140	5.9	−2.4
TUSC	Vivek Lehal	35	2.8	−0.3
Independent	Pauline Gibson	23	1.0	N/A
Majority		849	35.9	
Turnout		2,363	25.03	−10.47
Labour hold		Swing		

=== 2014 election ===
The election took place on 22 May 2014.

2014 Haringey London Borough Council election: Woodside (3)
Party	Candidate	Votes	%	±%
Labour	George Meehan	2,018	61.7	+16.0
Labour	Patrick Egan	1,947	59.5	+12.1
Labour	Ann Waters	1,865	57.0	+15.1
Liberal Democrats	Craig Brown	418	12.8	−22.9
Green	Kathryn Dean	406	12.4	+5.8
Liberal Democrats	Roxanne Squire	393	12.0	−21.7
Liberal Democrats	Kirsty Allan	361	11.0	−19.7
Green	David Rennie	342	10.4	+4.4
Conservative	David Noble	271	8.3	−4.0
UKIP	Jodie Gravett	259	7.9	N/A
Green	Mike Shaughnessy	254	7.8	+1.9
Conservative	Laurence Pearce	244	7.5	−3.9
Conservative	David Sheen	207	6.3	−4.7
TUSC	Jack Gautami	100	3.1	N/A
Independent	Bee Adan	61	1.9	N/A
Turnout		3,295	35.50	−20.8
Labour hold		Swing		
Labour hold		Swing		
Labour hold		Swing		

=== 2010 election ===
The election on 6 May 2010 took place on the same day as the United Kingdom general election.

=== 2006 election ===
The election took place on 4 May 2006.

=== 2002 election ===
The election took place on 2 May 2002.

== 1978–2002 Haringey Forest council elections ==
=== 1998 election ===
The election on 7 May 1998 took place on the same day as the 1998 Greater London Authority referendum.

=== 1994 election ===
The election took place on 5 May 1994.

=== 1990 election ===
The election took place on 3 May 1990.

1990 Haringey London Borough Council election: Woodside (3)
Party	Candidate	Votes	%	±%
Conservative	Jim Buckley	1,609	44.9	+3.0
Labour	James Gardner	1,503	41.9	+0.5
Conservative	Neil Rostron	1,430	39.9	+3.1
Labour	Sharon Lawrence	1,419	39.6	−0.2
Conservative	Malcolm Glynn	1,413	39.4	+2.8
Labour	Jayanti Patel	1,392	38.8	+0.3
Green	Christopher Rourke	465	13.0	N/A
Liberal Democrats	Nicholas Aleksander	221	6.2	−2.3
SDP	Jane Greig	219	6.1	−6.6
Turnout		3,596	50.0	−5.1
Conservative hold		Swing		
Labour hold		Swing		
Conservative gain from Labour		Swing		

=== 1989 by-election ===
The by-election took place on 9 February 1989, following the resignation of Bernard Dehnel.

1989 Woodside by-election
Party	Candidate	Votes	%	±%
Conservative	Jim Buckley	1,419	53.5	+11.6
Labour	Jobaidur Rahman	1,126	42.4	+3.9
Liberal Democrats	Nicholas Aleksander	109	4.1	−4.4
Turnout			35.48	
Conservative hold		Swing		

=== 1986 election ===
The election took place on 8 May 1986.

1986 Haringey London Borough Council election: Woodside (3)
Party	Candidate	Votes	%	±%
Conservative	Bernard Dehnel	1,758	41.9	−1.1
Labour	Jim Gardner	1,739	41.4	+4.9
Labour	Peter Doble	1,670	39.8	+4.5
Labour	Adelaide Leslie	1,617	38.5	+3.3
Conservative	Irma Rupe	1,546	36.8	−4.9
Conservative	Ivars Svillis	1,537	36.6	−4.9
Alliance (SDP)	Jane Greig	532	12.7	−4.4
Alliance (SDP)	Leonard Schmid	468	11.1	−4.6
Alliance (Liberal)	Nicholas Aleksander	355	8.5	−6.0
United Independent Group	Andras Chrysostomou	84	2.0	N/A
Turnout		4,198	55.1	+11.9
Conservative hold		Swing		
Labour gain from Conservative		Swing		
Labour gain from Conservative		Swing		

=== 1984 by-election ===
The by-election took place on 12 April 1984, following the resignation of Eva Robinson.

1984 Woodside by-election
Party	Candidate	Votes	%	±%
Labour	Jim Gardner	1,728	55.1	+18.6
Conservative	Dorothy Cowan	1,045	33.3	−8.2
Alliance	John Warren	362	11.5	−5.6
Turnout			43.2	
Labour gain from Conservative		Swing		

=== 1982 election ===
The election took place on 6 May 1982.

1982 Haringey London Borough Council election: Woodside (3)
Party	Candidate	Votes	%	±%
Conservative	Bernard Dehnel	1,430	43.0	+0.2
Conservative	Olive Baker	1,389	41.7	−2.1
Conservative	Eva Robinson	1,382	41.5	−0.4
Labour	Ulric Thompson	1,214	36.5	−6.8
Labour	Frederick Neuner	1,174	35.3	−6.0
Labour	David Billingsley	1,171	35.2	−9.1
Alliance (SDP)	Sheila Berkery Smith	568	17.1	+14.2
Alliance (Liberal)	Stephen Pearson	524	15.7	N/A
Alliance (Liberal)	Anthony Zotti	484	14.5	N/A
Turnout		3,327	43.2	−0.8
Conservative hold		Swing		
Conservative gain from Labour		Swing		
Conservative gain from Labour		Swing		

=== 1979 by-election ===
The by-election took place on 15 March 1979, following the resignation of Jacqueline Goodwin.

1979 Woodside by-election
Party	Candidate	Votes	%	±%
Conservative	Bernard Dehnel	1,588	59.0	+16.2
Labour	John Warren	1,010	37.5	−5.8
Liberal	Antony Zotti	95	3.5	+0.6
Turnout			35.0	
Conservative gain from Labour		Swing		

=== 1978 election ===
The election took place on 4 May 1978.

1978 Haringey London Borough Council election: Woodside (3)
Party	Candidate	Votes	%	±%
Labour	David Billingsley	1,475	44.3	
Conservative	Edward Auger	1,457	43.8	
Labour	Jacqueline Goodwin	1,439	43.3	
Conservative	Bernard Dehnel	1,425	42.8	
Conservative	Walter Taylor	1,395	41.9	
Labour	Harold Stedman	1,373	41.3	
National Front	Thomas Barnes	183	5.5	
National Front	Paul White	172	5.2	
National Front	Kenneth Hill	163	4.9	
Liberal	Audrey Hosein	96	2.9	
Turnout		3,327	44.0	
Labour win (new seat)				
Conservative win (new seat)				
Labour win (new seat)				
