= Newport Association Football Club Ltd and others v Football Association of Wales Ltd =

1995 EWHC court case

- Court: High Court of Justice
- Full case name: Newport Association Football Club Ltd and others v Football Association of Wales Ltd [1995] 2 ALL ER 87
- Decided: 11 April 1995
- Citation: 2 ALL ER 87

Court membership
- Judge sitting: William Blackburne

Case opinions
- Preventing Welsh clubs that play in English leagues from playing in Wales is an unlawful restraint of trade
- Decision by: Mr Justice Blackburne

Newport Association Football Club Ltd and others v Football Association of Wales Ltd [1995] 2 ALL ER 87 is a High Court of Justice court case between Newport A.F.C. and the Football Association of Wales (FAW). The case resolved around the Football Association of Wales refusing to allow Newport A.F.C. to play the club's home games in Wales owing to them choosing to remain in the English football pyramid instead of joining the newly formed League of Wales. Newport appealed this as a restraint of trade. The court found in favour of Newport and issued an injunction preventing the FAW stopping Newport from playing in Wales.

== Background ==
Newport County A.F.C. were originally founded in 1912 and were one of a number of football clubs in industrial South Wales invited to join the Southern Football League in England. At the end of the 1919–20 season the majority of the Southern League became the new Third Division of the Football League. In 1989, having been automatically relegated out of the Football League the previous season, the club was liquidated with debts of £330,000 (equivalent to £873,169 in 2025). Fans created Newport A.F.C. as a phoenix club, however, they were barred by Newport City Council from using the club's old Somerton Park ground as the council viewed the new company as a continuation of the old and asserted they owed back rent for the ground. Whereas the FAW ruled they were a new club with no connection to Newport County. The club's stated aim was to regain Football League status, and as such, they started in the Hellenic League, which as part of the English football league system allowed eventual promotion back to that level and as Wales had historically had no national league.

In 1992, the FAW created the League of Wales and invited Newport to join. The club declined and although the FAW had granted permission for them to continue to play in the English leagues, they banned them and any other Welsh club playing in the English leagues below the Football League from playing their scheduled matches at home in Wales. The legal reasoning for being able to do the action was not revealed though it was stated that "it was designed to promote the League of Wales, despite no contractual obligations between the FAW and Newport requiring member clubs to join existing." The action resulted in Newport having to groundshare with Moreton Town F.C. in Gloucestershire. The decision affected seven other Welsh clubs that played in the English football pyramid, Bangor City, Barry Town, Caernarfon Town, Colwyn Bay, Merthyr Tydfil, Newtown, and Rhyl, whom began to collectively be referred to by the Welsh press as the "Irate Eight". Four of the affected clubs joined the League of Wales, but Merthyr Tydfil, Newport, Caernarfon Town, and Colwyn Bay remained. The latter three appealed the FAW's decision but their appeal was rejected after a hearing.

After an attempt at obtaining arbitration that failed and due to the excessive costs of playing 80 miles (130 kilometres) away in England, Newport sued the FAW on the grounds of restraint of trade in what had been stated as the first occasion where an individual football club has taken its football association to court. The club cited inconsistencies in application as Merthyr Tydfil played in the Football Conference yet were allowed to play the club's home games in Wales and had permission to continue to play in Wales if they were relegated. This was due to Merthyr Tidfil being successful in an independent FAW appeal.

== Case ==
The case was heard at the High Court in London before Mr Justice William Blackburne in April 1995. The clubs requested an urgent injunction to allow them to play in Wales during the case and sought a declaratory judgement that the FAW's decision to ban them from playing in Wales was an "unreasonable" restraint of trade and requested £300,000 (equivalent to £616,774 in 2025) each in compensation for breach of contract. The clubs stated "they would not be able to continue to operate due to the expense of not playing at home." The FAW responded saying the court had no jurisdiction to grant an injunction without the declaratory judgement. The FAW claimed that the ban was needed in order to protect Welsh clubs' representation in order to partake in UEFA run European competitions. The court had previously ruled in August 1994 that it did have the power to issue such an injunction if it wished.

Mr Justice Blackburne considered the case based upon the case of Pharmaceutical Society of Great Britain v Dickson. He ruled on 11 April that the FAW's ruling had been a restraint of trade but considered whether this was a justified one. He ruled that it was not as it was not necessary to protect recognition of the new League of Wales by UEFA and the FAW ruling was done specifically to get the clubs to play in the Welsh league system. He also ruled that UEFA had never offered an opinion on the matter, the FAW had provided no evidence that UEFA would discriminate against Welsh clubs and the fact that the FAW had permitted the clubs to continue to play in the English leagues had not prevented UEFA recognising the league. Blackburne recognised that there was a genuine risk that the clubs could cease to exist, if they played another season away from home, due to the financial burdens. He ruled that the FAW's ban on playing in Wales was an "unlawful and unreasonable restraint of trade" and granted judgment in favour of Newport and the other clubs, allowing them to play at home in Wales. He granted the injunction to prohibit the FAW from banning clubs playing in Wales if they played in the English league. The breach of contract compensation claims were denied.

== Aftermath ==
Despite the judgment in favour of Newport, the world football governing body FIFA announced that they would seek to ban the 3 clubs from playing as a punishment for suing the FAW. 10 days after the ruling, FIFA informed The Football Association (The FA) that all three were banned from football indefinitely with the club officials behind the lawsuit all receiving two year bans. In December 1995, following a request from the FAW "in the interests of peace", the bans were later rescinded in favour of a requirement that the clubs join the League of Wales by 1997, which never occurred. In 1997, FIFA did not attempt to enforce the requirement.

Though the clubs played in leagues governed by The FA, jurisdiction for disciplinary matters relating for the Welsh clubs in English leagues remained with the FAW. The situation continued until 2011 when it was revealed that Cardiff City could not be punished for breaching FA third-party ownership rules as the FAW had no such rules. Following the revelation, The FA would assert disciplinary jurisdiction over Welsh clubs playing in the English Football League.

Newport would subsequently repurchase the trademark for their previous club's name and would compete as Newport County A.F.C., winning promotion to the Football League in 2013. Caernarfon Town would resign from the Northern Premier League after the 1994–95 season, opting to join the League of Wales despite the ruling. Colwyn Bay would follow suit in 2019, leaving the Northern Premier League Division One West to join the FAW's Cymru North.
