= 2026 Haringey London Borough Council election =

2026 English local election

- 7 May 2026

All 57 seats to Haringey London Borough Council 29 seats needed for a majority
- Registered: 183,209
- Turnout: 80,255; 43.81%
	First party	Second party	Third party
Leader	Lotte Collett (Note: Leader of the Green Socialist Group before the election; Mark Blake was selected as leader of the Green Group after the election.)	Peray Ahmet (Note: Ibrahim Ali was selected as leader of the Labour group after the election.)	Luke Cawley-Harrison
Party	Green	Labour	Liberal Democrats
Leader's seat	Did not stand (Note: Lotte Collett sat as an Independent Socialist councillor for Woodside but did not seek re-election.)	Noel Park (lost)	Crouch End
Last election	0 seats, 8.6%	50 seats, 59.9%	7 seats, 24.0%
Seats before	2 (Note: Both Green councillors sat in the Green Socialist Group with 2 Independents.)	44	7
Seats won	28	21	8
Seat change	▲28	▼29	▲1
Popular vote	75,046	72,415	36,630
Percentage	35.4%	34.2%	17.3%
Swing	▲26.8pp	▼25.7pp	▼6.7pp
- Map of the results of the 2026 Haringey London Borough Council election. Labour in red, Liberal Democrats in orange and Greens in green.
Leader before election
Peray Ahmet
Labour
Leader after election
Mark Blake
Green

The 2026 Haringey London Borough Council election took place on 7 May 2026, as part of the 2026 United Kingdom local elections. All 57 members of Haringey London Borough Council were elected. The election took place alongside local elections in the other London boroughs.

Prior to the election, the council was under Labour majority control. At the election, the council went under no overall control, and the incumbent Labour leader of the council, Peray Ahmet, lost her seat. The Green Party won the most seats, but fell one seat short of winning an overall majority. After the election, they chose Mark Blake to be their new group leader. He was formally appointed as the new leader of the council at the subsequent annual council meeting on 20 May 2026, leading a Green minority administration.

== Background ==
=== History ===
Result of the 2022 council election

The thirty-two London boroughs were established in 1965 by the London Government Act 1963. They are the principal authorities in Greater London and have responsibilities including education, housing, planning, highways, social services, libraries, recreation, waste, environmental health and revenue collection. Some powers are shared with the Greater London Authority, which also manages passenger transport, police, and fire.

Since its formation, Haringey has been continuously under Labour control, apart from a period of Conservative control from 1968 to 1971. Since 2002, only Labour and Liberal Democrat councillors have been elected. In the most recent council election in 2022, Labour won 50 seats with 59.9% of the vote and the Liberal Democrats won 7 seats with 24.0% of the vote. The Green Party received 8.6% of the vote and the Conservatives won 6.9% of the vote, though neither party won any seats. The incumbent leader of the council is the Labour councillor Peray Ahmet, who has held that role since 2021.

=== Council term ===
Since the previous election Labour have lost six seats to defections and by-election losses. In July 2025, two Green councillors and two independent councillors formed the Green Socialist Alliance group on the council. One seat is vacant going into the 2026 election due to the resignation of Labour councillor Mike Hakata.

== Electoral process ==
Haringey, as is the case all other London borough councils, elects all of its councillors at once every four years, with the previous election having taken place in 2022. The election takes place by multi-member first-past-the-post voting, with each ward being represented by two or three councillors. Electors will have as many votes as there are councillors to be elected in their ward, with the top two or three being elected.

All registered electors (British, Irish, Commonwealth and European Union citizens) living in London aged 18 or over are entitled to vote in the election. People who live at two addresses in different councils, such as university students with different term-time and holiday addresses, are entitled to be registered for and vote in elections in both local authorities. Voting in-person at polling stations takes place from 7:00 to 22:00 on election day, and voters are able to apply for postal votes or proxy votes in advance of the election.

The Green Party and the Haringey Socialist Alliance have announced an electoral co-operation deal, in which the Greens are standing only one candidate in Northumberland Park, Bruce Castle and West Green wards, with the Haringey Socialist Alliance standing two in these.

== Council composition ==
After 2022 election		Before 2026 election		After 2026 election	
Party	Seats	Party	Seats	Party	Seats
Labour	50	Labour	43	Green	28
Liberal Democrats	7	Liberal Democrats	7	Labour	21
		Green	2	Liberal Democrats	8
		Independent	4		
		Vacant	1		

== Election result ==
2026 Haringey London Borough Council election
Party	Candidates	Seats	Gains	Losses	Net gain/loss	Seats %	Votes %	Votes	+/−
Green	51	28	26	1	▲25	49.1	35.4	75,046	+26.8
Labour	57	21	5	27	▼22	36.8	34.2	72,415	–25.7
Liberal Democrats	57	8	3	2	▲1	14.0	17.3	36,630	–6.7
Conservative	57	0	0	0	Steady	0.0	6.3	13,340	–0.5
Reform	37	0	0	0	Steady	0.0	4.0	8,543	N/A
Socialist Alliance	6	0	0	0	Steady	0.0	2.0	4,233	N/A
Independent	2	0	0	4	▼4	0.0	0.6	1,373	+0.2
TUSC	3	0	0	0	Steady	0.0	0.1	158	N/A
CPA	3	0	0	0	Steady	0.0	0.1	140	±0.0

== Ward results ==
=== Alexandra Park ===
Alexandra Park (2)
Party	Candidate	Votes	%	±%
Labour	Melanie Gingell	1,161	29.4	−15.4
Labour	AJ Egemonye	1,144	28.9	−12.2
Liberal Democrats	Paul Dennison	1,043	26.4	−18.3
Liberal Democrats	Shelley Salter	956	24.2	−13.6
Green	Michael Anderson	877	22.2	+5.1
Green	Brij Sharma	803	20.3	N/A
Independent	Yulia Bakman	704	17.8	N/A
Independent	Helen Gerolaki	669	16.9	N/A
Reform	Will Lewis	150	3.8	N/A
Conservative	Guy Carter	142	3.6	−2.9
Conservative	Xander Phillips	110	2.8	N/A
Turnout		3,952	60.4	+9.7
Labour hold				
Labour gain from Liberal Democrats				

=== Bounds Green ===
Bounds Green (2)
Party	Candidate	Votes	%	±%
Labour	Emily Arkell*	1,212	38.0	−20.7
Labour	Andrea Hodgson	994	31.1	−21.9
Liberal Democrats	Dan Jones	965	30.2	+5.5
Green	Emily Carr	865	27.1	+10.8
Liberal Democrats	Asli Nicolaou	781	24.5	+1.6
Green	Phil Sheridan	701	22.0	N/A
Conservative	Adam Rynhold	219	6.9	−0.8
Reform	John Attree	218	6.8	N/A
Conservative	Kono Kono-Ugen	196	6.1	−1.2
Turnout		3,193	47.50	+10.09
Rejected ballots		16		
Labour hold				
Labour hold				

- Emily Arkell was an incumbent councillor for Bounds Green ward.

=== Bruce Castle ===
Bruce Castle (3)
Party	Candidate	Votes	%	±%
Labour	Ibrahim Ali*	1,298	46.1	−25.3
Green	Dan Johnson	1,209	42.9	+26.5
Labour	Sue Jameson*	1,068	37.9	−31.4
Labour	Duygu Toguz	937	33.3	−36.0
Socialist Alliance	Amelie Cooper	599	21.3	N/A
Socialist Alliance	Paul Burnham	528	18.8	N/A
Conservative	James Barton	275	9.8	−2.0
Conservative	Kehinde Ajao	238	8.5	−1.2
Reform	Kevin Blackwell	238	8.5	N/A
Reform	John Poulter	230	8.2	N/A
Liberal Democrats	Justin Hinchcliffe	184	6.5	−0.7
Liberal Democrats	Cara Jenkinson	181	6.4	+0.4
Conservative	Queenjane Tobin	176	6.3	−2.7
Liberal Democrats	Paul Negus	134	4.8	−1.0
Turnout		2,815	32.7	+7.27
Rejected ballots		28		
Labour hold				
Green gain from Labour				
Labour hold				

- Ibrahim Ali and Sue Jameson were incumbent councillors for Bruce Castle ward.

=== Crouch End ===
Crouch End (3)
Party	Candidate	Votes	%	±%
Liberal Democrats	Luke Cawley-Harrison*	2,338	41.6	−0.7
Liberal Democrats	Fiona Orford-Williams	1,865	33.2	−7.6
Liberal Democrats	Imad Ahmed	1,846	32.9	−3.9
Labour	Cressida Johnson*	1,715	30.5	−19.2
Green	Tay Quartermain	1,552	27.6	+3.7
Labour	Lester Buxton*	1,542	27.4	−15.3
Labour	Niall Adams	1,511	26.9	−14.8
Green	Rimil Hembrom	1,496	26.6	N/A
Green	Dushka Wertenbaker-Man	1,397	24.9	N/A
Reform	Theodora Nathanael	248	4.4	N/A
Reform	Christian Dike	233	4.1	N/A
Conservative	Jeanne Sherwood	224	4.0	−1.8
Conservative	Julian Sherwood	221	3.9	N/A
Conservative	Ann Sinnott	183	3.3	N/A
CPA	Thomas Williams	79	1.4	N/A
Turnout		5,618	54.3	+9.2
Liberal Democrats gain from Labour				
Liberal Democrats gain from Labour				
Liberal Democrats hold				

- Lester Buxton, Luke Cawley-Harrison and Cressida Johnson were incumbent councillors for Crouch End ward.

=== Fortis Green ===
Fortis Green (3)
Party	Candidate	Votes	%	±%
Liberal Democrats	Dawn Barnes*	1,871	37.0	−10.1
Labour	Michael Brookes	1,712	33.9	−9.5
Labour	Daniela Parry	1,654	32.7	−8.8
Liberal Democrats	Matthew Bentham	1,573	31.1	−9.5
Labour	David Kahn	1,565	31.0	−8.3
Liberal Democrats	Viv Ross	1,427	28.3	−11.3
Green	Debbie Dixon	1,166	23.1	+2.5
Green	Greg Dryer	1,027	20.3	N/A
Green	Christyn Parkes	995	19.7	N/A
Conservative	Karin Carver	356	7.0	−0.4
Conservative	Rebecca White	338	6.7	−0.6
Reform	Jo Clark	316	6.3	N/A
Conservative	Jai Singh	311	6.2	N/A
Reform	Lidia Mihele	273	5.4	N/A
Reform	Michael Tringham	262	5.2	N/A
Turnout		5,051	53.6	+8.19
Liberal Democrats hold				
Labour hold				
Labour hold				

- Dawn Barnes was an incumbent councillor for Fortis Green ward.

=== Harringay ===
Harringay (3)
Party	Candidate	Votes	%	±%
Green	Jo Kuper	2,458	51.1	+27.3
Green	Rosie Latchford	2,457	51.1	N/A
Green	Marc Jenner	2,408	50.1	N/A
Labour Co-op	Anna Abela*	1,621	33.7	−19.2
Labour Co-op	Zena Brabazon*	1,404	29.2	−20.7
Labour Co-op	Olly Bennathan	1,360	28.3	−21.5
Liberal Democrats	Karen Alexander	531	11.0	−22.0
Liberal Democrats	David Schmitz	500	10.4	−18.3
Liberal Democrats	Dom Gibson	386	8.0	−17.8
Conservative	Juliet Donnelly	215	4.5	−0.3
Reform	Rosemary Parry	199	4.1	N/A
Conservative	Jonathan Thornton	190	4.0	−0.5
Conservative	Lili Shtipska	173	3.6	−0.4
TUSC	Nick Davies	68	1.4	N/A
Turnout		4,807	46.9	+9.7
Green gain from Labour				
Green gain from Labour				
Green gain from Labour				

- Anna Abela and Zena Brabazon were incumbent councillors for Harringay ward.

=== Hermitage & Gardens ===
Hermitage & Gardens (2)
Party	Candidate	Votes	%	±%
Green	Ata Berk Aksit	1,773	60.8	+35.6
Green	Fin Fitzgerald	1,676	57.5	+44.6
Labour	Millie Cartwright	853	29.3	−37.9
Labour	Edward Lewis-Smith	702	24.1	−36.5
Liberal Democrats	Ronald Aitken	144	4.9	−2.5
Liberal Democrats	Lydia Hirst	142	4.9	−2.5
Conservative	Catherine El-Gamry	127	4.4	−2.2
Reform	Susan Attridge	106	3.6	N/A
Conservative	Daniel El-Gamry	98	3.3	−3.2
TUSC	Amnon Cohen	32	1.1	N/A
Turnout		2,916	46.2	+16.2
Green gain from Labour				
Green gain from Labour				

=== Highgate ===
Highgate (3)
Party	Candidate	Votes	%	±%
Liberal Democrats	Scott Emery*	1,829	37.2	−4.3
Liberal Democrats	Nick Da Costa*	1,815	36.9	−9.6
Green	Eva Bell	1,448	29.4	+5.9
Liberal Democrats	Shamim Muhammad	1,357	27.6	−15.4
Green	Max Knowles-Parr	1,186	24.1	N/A
Green	Svenja Nierwetberg	1,138	23.1	N/A
Labour	Sofia Patse	1,077	21.9	−17.5
Labour	David Talbot	1,016	20.7	−10.9
Labour	Sean Smyth	969	19.7	−11.2
Conservative	Nathan Steinberg	561	11.4	−1.9
Conservative	Catherine McQueen	555	11.3	−0.8
Conservative	Skye Phillips	479	9.7	N/A
Reform	Christian Mehl	386	7.8	N/A
Reform	Oliver Victorio	325	6.6	N/A
Reform	Shahab Mossavat	309	6.3	N/A
Turnout		4,918	50.7	+10.6
Liberal Democrats hold				
Liberal Democrats hold				
Green gain from Liberal Democrats				

- Nick Da Costa and Scott Emery were incumbent councillors for Highgate ward.

=== Hornsey ===
Hornsey (3)
Party	Candidate	Votes	%	±%
Labour	Dana Carlin*	2,282	40.7	−21.5
Labour	Adam Small*	2,282	40.7	−24.4
Labour	Elin Weston*	2,134	38.1	−21.9
Green	David Baulk	2,095	37.4	+21.9
Green	Felicity De Motta	2,027	36.2	+22.1
Green	Lucas Bouvier	2,002	35.7	+21.7
Liberal Democrats	Gilly Kilby-Gjini	843	15.0	−1.7
Liberal Democrats	Julia Ogiehor	798	14.2	−0.1
Liberal Democrats	Tom Williams	791	14.1	+0.6
Reform	Mark Cortacans	290	5.2	N/A
Conservative	Kay Carter	285	5.1	−1.6
Conservative	John Carver	260	4.6	−1.5
Conservative	Harry Sullivan	229	4.1	N/A
Turnout		5,602	50.2	+10.3
Labour hold				
Labour hold				
Labour hold				

- Dana Carlin, Adam Small and Elin Weston were incumbent councillors for Hornsey ward. Adam Small was elected in a by-election on 4 July 2024, following the resignation of Adam Jogee.

=== Muswell Hill ===
Muswell Hill (2)
Party	Candidate	Votes	%	±%
Liberal Democrats	Karolina Braun	1,474	40.3	−9.2
Liberal Democrats	Tony Powell	1,273	34.8	−6.6
Labour	Cathy Brennan*	1,192	32.3	−9.2
Labour	Sean O'Donovan**	925	25.3	−7.6
Green	Florence Wright	853	23.3	+5.3
Green	Josh Thomson	743	20.3	N/A
Conservative	Eva Carr	209	5.7	−2.7
Reform	Geno Esposito	191	5.2	N/A
Conservative	Ben Lloyd	189	5.2	N/A
Reform	Michael Gabbay	185	5.1	N/A
Turnout		3,658	55.7	+8.3
Liberal Democrats hold				
Liberal Democrats gain from Labour				

- Cathy Brennan was an incumbent councillor for Muswell Hill ward. Sean O'Donovan was an incumbent councillor for Tottenham Hale ward.

=== Noel Park ===
Noel Park (3)
Party	Candidate	Votes	%	±%
Green	Johann Beckford	1,582	43.7	N/A
Green	Simon Clark	1,548	42.8	N/A
Green	Erin Wolson	1,514	41.8	N/A
Labour	Peray Ahmet*	1,367	37.8	−34.1
Labour	Emine Ibrahim*	1,180	32.6	−36.3
Labour	Menha Zola	1,095	30.3	−32.9
Liberal Democrats	David Beacham	344	9.5	−10.5
Reform	Jade Blackwell	287	7.9	N/A
Reform	David Hardie	276	7.6	N/A
Conservative	Eva Kleinova	275	7.6	−4.1
Liberal Democrats	Arzu Ercan	264	7.3	−12.4
Conservative	Martyna Piadlowska	231	6.4	N/A
Liberal Democrats	Richard Mansfield	230	6.4	−12.9
Conservative	Dariusz Piadlowski	201	5.6	N/A
Turnout		3,618	35.6	+8.3
Green gain from Labour				
Green gain from Labour				
Green gain from Labour				

- Peray Ahmet and Emine Ibrahim were incumbent councillors for Noel Park ward.

=== Northumberland Park ===
Northumberland Park (3)
Party	Candidate	Votes	%	±%
Labour	Kaushika Amin*	1,238	43.7	−29.6
Labour	John Bevan*	1,237	43.7	−29.7
Green	Jayon Henriques	1,135	40.1	+27.2
Labour	Ajda Ovat*	1,022	36.1	−33.4
Socialist Alliance	Alison Davy	823	29.1	N/A
Socialist Alliance	Gary McFarlane	622	22.0	N/A
Conservative	Robin Everett	270	9.5	−1.5
Conservative	Dominic Graham	241	8.5	−1.3
Reform	Dominic Simler	231	8.2	N/A
Conservative	Peter Gorski	227	8.0	+0.2
Liberal Democrats	Glen Nichol	182	6.4	−1.3
Liberal Democrats	Charlotte Schmitz	170	6.0	−0.8
Liberal Democrats	Richard Teuten	125	4.4	−2.4
Turnout		2,830	32.0	+6.2
Labour hold				
Labour hold				
Green gain from Labour				

- Kaushika Amin, John Bevan and Ajda Ovat were incumbent councillors for Northumberland Park ward.

=== Seven Sisters ===
Seven Sisters (2)
Party	Candidate	Votes	%	±%
Green	Ash Ahmed	1,208	50.1	+29.1
Green	Luisa Brands	1,076	44.6	N/A
Labour	Barbara Blake*	917	38.0	−34.9
Labour	Michelle Simmons-Safo*	783	32.5	−31.3
Reform	Miguel Koseleff	135	5.6	N/A
Conservative	Tatiana Piadlowska	128	5.3	−5.3
Conservative	Shloime Royde	124	5.1	−3.6
Reform	Raul Mancera	121	5.0	N/A
Liberal Democrats	Joan Lindeman	86	3.6	−3.5
Liberal Democrats	Jhonny Rodriguez	65	2.7	−1.3
Turnout		2,410	40.1	+11.8
Green gain from Labour				
Green gain from Labour				

- Barbara Blake and Michelle Simmons-Safo were incumbent councillors for Seven Sisters ward.

=== South Tottenham ===
South Tottenham (3)
Party	Candidate	Votes	%	±%
Labour	Mark Grosskopf*	1,569	47.2	−20.2
Labour	Makbule Gunes*	1,468	44.2	−22.0
Labour	Anna Lawton**	1,445	43.5	−24.5
Green	Aisha Dodwell	1,185	35.6	+18.6
Green	Joss MacDonald	1,123	33.8	N/A
Green	Charlotte Pink	1,107	33.3	N/A
Conservative	Stephen Noble	270	8.1	−7.9
Reform	Ian Sinclair	235	7.1	N/A
Conservative	Patricia Mindham	229	6.9	−8.4
Conservative	Judith Okeno	199	6.0	−9.0
Liberal Democrats	Suzanne Crossman	199	6.0	+0.1
Liberal Democrats	Richard Marks	139	4.2	−1.4
Liberal Democrats	Roger Mothersdale	124	3.7	−1.0
Turnout		3,324	35.2	+8.4
Labour hold				
Labour hold				
Labour hold				

- Mark Grosskopf and Makbule Gunes were incumbent councillors for South Tottenham. Mark Grosskopf was elected in a by-election on 4 October 2023, following the resignation of Charles Adje. Anna Lawton was an incumbent councillor for Hermitage & Gardens ward, elected in a by-election on 29 June 2023 following the death of Julie Davies.

=== St Ann's ===
St Ann's (2)
Party	Candidate	Votes	%	±%
Green	Ruaridh Paton*	1,640	58.0	+15.0
Green	Georgia Twigg	1,522	53.9	+20.2
Labour	Vanessa Heron-Hua	819	29.0	−25.5
Labour	Amit Kamal	789	27.9	−20.3
Reform	Susan Button	165	5.8	N/A
Conservative	Devi Dimitrova	148	5.2	N/A
Conservative	Claudia Matthews	145	5.1	N/A
Liberal Democrats	Marisha Ray	110	3.9	−2.8
Liberal Democrats	Gregory Hirst	107	3.8	−2.8
Turnout		2,826	42.2	+10.8
Green gain from Labour				
Green gain from Labour				

- Ruaridh Paton was an incumbent councillor for St Ann's ward, elected in a by-election on 10 April 2025 following the resignation of Tammy Hymas.

=== Stroud Green ===
Stroud Green (3)
Party	Candidate	Votes	%	±%
Green	Beth Anderson	2,131	44.8	+18.4
Green	Gio Iozzi	1,824	38.4	N/A
Green	Eddy Thacker	1,796	37.8	N/A
Liberal Democrats	Liz Whitlock	1,342	28.2	−5.9
Labour	George Dunstall*	1,265	26.6	−21.2
Liberal Democrats	Nicholas Orford-Williams	1,205	25.4	−5.1
Liberal Democrats	David Vigoureux	1,172	24.7	−4.6
Labour	Navdeep Kaur	1,130	23.8	−32.0
Labour	James Hand	1,119	23.5	−28.8
Conservative	David Douglas	155	3.3	+0.2
Conservative	Daphne Forrest	150	3.2	−0.3
Reform	Mark Gurney	150	3.2	N/A
Conservative	Peter Forrest	146	3.1	N/A
Reform	Valerie Henderson	136	2.9	N/A
Reform	Ciprian Mihele	121	2.5	N/A
TUSC	Nick Auvache	58	1.2	N/A
CPA	Helen Spiby-Vann	31	0.7	−0.8
CPA	Amelia Allao	30	0.6	−0.7
Turnout		4,752	55.3	+11.4
Green gain from Labour				
Green gain from Labour				
Green gain from Labour				

- George Dunstall was an incumbent councillor for Stroud Green ward.

=== Tottenham Central ===
Tottenham Central (3)
Party	Candidate	Votes	%	±%
Green	Mark Blake**	2,101	52.4	+27.9
Green	Dixie-Ann Joseph	2,052	51.2	N/A
Green	Andrew Reid	1,931	48.2	N/A
Labour Co-op	Funmi Abari	1,388	34.6	−37.9
Labour Co-op	Matt White*	1,283	32.0	−38.5
Labour Co-op	Zak Ivany	1,191	29.7	−33.0
Conservative	Trevor Malcolm	269	6.7	−2.7
Liberal Democrats	Matthew Evans	252	6.3	−3.7
Reform	Joe Doyle	225	5.6	N/A
Conservative	Jeanne Mendis-Abeysekera	218	5.4	−3.5
Liberal Democrats	Yolanda Powell	200	5.0	−4.5
Conservative	Doulla Theodorou	193	4.8	−2.5
Liberal Democrats	Uladzislau Ramanenka	140	3.5	−3.8
Turnout		4,006	40.8	+13.2
Green gain from Labour				
Green gain from Labour				
Green gain from Labour				

- Mark Blake was an incumbent councillor for Fortis Green ward. Matt White was an incumbent councillor for Tottenham Central ward.

=== Tottenham Hale ===
Tottenham Hale (3)
Party	Candidate	Votes	%	±%
Green	Tehseen Khan	1,619	50.5	+33.5
Green	Hannah Ward	1,551	48.4	+33.4
Green	Nelly Tackie	1,499	46.8	N/A
Labour	Sarah Carson	1,116	34.8	−39.7
Labour	Ruth Gordon*	1,089	34.0	−30.3
Labour	Stephen Tawiah	934	29.2	−34.9
Conservative	Maria Joseph	200	6.2	−2.9
Reform	Tracy Wackett	188	5.9	N/A
Conservative	Elizabeth Williams	174	5.4	−3.2
Liberal Democrats	Daniel Kinnear	172	5.4	−3.3
Conservative	Tamouy Black	168	5.2	−2.3
Liberal Democrats	Julie Whittaker	140	4.4	−3.8
Liberal Democrats	Gavin Rosenthal	136	4.2	−2.5
Turnout		3,204	37.3	+10.1
Green gain from Labour				
Green gain from Labour				
Green gain from Labour				

- Ruth Gordon was an incumbent councillor for Tottenham Hale ward.

=== West Green ===
West Green (3)
Party	Candidate	Votes	%	±%
Green	Anne Gray	2,009	51.1	N/A
Labour	Seema Chandwani*	1,727	44.0	−30.4
Labour	Sarah Williams*	1,504	38.3	−35.7
Labour	Sami Ngoie	1,343	34.2	−39.7
Socialist Alliance	Meryem Ulger	880	22.4	N/A
Socialist Alliance	John Sinha	781	19.9	N/A
Liberal Democrats	Birgit Duncan	418	10.6	−3.0
Liberal Democrats	Jim Jenks	326	8.3	−2.6
Liberal Democrats	Michael Woods	289	7.4	−1.3
Conservative	Damian Grigorov	281	7.2	−3.2
Conservative	Ewa Ostrowski	243	6.2	−4.0
Conservative	Caesar Lalobo	225	5.7	−2.7
Reform	Azbi Dauti	211	5.4	N/A
Reform	Andrew Price	205	5.2	N/A
Turnout		3,929	39.4	+17.9
Green gain from Labour				
Labour hold				
Labour hold				

- Seema Chandwani and Sarah Williams were incumbent councillors for West Green ward.

=== White Hart Lane ===
White Hart Lane (3)
Party	Candidate	Votes	%	±%
Green	Mike Hodges	1,318	40.5	N/A
Green	Marie Kristensen	1,246	38.3	N/A
Labour	Beverley Berrick	1,173	36.0	−26.6
Green	Shaan Rafiq	1,091	33.5	N/A
Labour	Ahmed Mahbub*	1,042	32.0	−28.7
Labour	Ishaq Pathan	930	28.6	−31.7
Reform	Andrew Bence	362	11.1	N/A
Reform	Jacqueline Newland	327	10.0	N/A
Conservative	Plamena Grigorova	306	9.4	−3.8
Reform	David Powder	303	9.3	N/A
Conservative	Esther Prasad	278	8.5	−3.2
Conservative	Angelos Tsangarides	261	8.0	−3.6
Liberal Democrats	Emma Chennells	246	7.6	−3.6
Liberal Democrats	Jeremy Cunnington	191	5.9	−2.0
Liberal Democrats	Robert Lindsay-Smith	173	5.3	−2.2
Turnout		3,254	34.0	+4.0
Green gain from Labour				
Green gain from Labour				
Labour hold				

- Ahmed Mahbub was an incumbent councillor for White Hart Lane ward.

=== Woodside ===
Woodside (3)
Party	Candidate	Votes	%	±%
Labour	Lucia Das Neves*	1,434	40.1	−27.1
Green	Tammy Hymas	1,394	39.0	+16.0
Labour	Hasret Bozdogan	1,337	37.4	−29.9
Green	Hayley Jukes	1,334	37.3	N/A
Green	Sumrah Mohammed	1,158	32.4	N/A
Labour	Thayahlan Iyngkaran*	1,151	32.2	−25.2
Liberal Democrats	Marsha Isilar-Gosling**	388	10.9	−3.8
Liberal Democrats	Nigel Scott	355	9.9	−4.4
Conservative	Rita Hand	316	8.8	−3.3
Liberal Democrats	Keshon Smith	293	8.2	−4.8
Reform	Ruth Price	266	7.4	N/A
Conservative	Mikeleno Fureraj	264	7.4	−2.0
Conservative	Neil O'Shea	246	6.9	N/A
Reform	Ciprian Mihele	240	6.7	N/A
Reform	Da Wei	200	5.6	N/A
Turnout		3,572	36.3	+6.0
Labour hold				
Green gain from Labour				
Labour hold				

- Thayahlan Iyngkaran and Lucia Das Neves were incumbent councillors for Woodside ward. Marsha Isilar-Gosling was an incumbent councillor for Highgate ward.

== By-elections ==
=== Northumberland Park ===
A by-election was held on 25 June 2026 as Jayon Henriques (Green) was unable to take up his seat.

Northumberland Park ward by-election, 25 June 2026
Party	Candidate	Votes	%	±%
Labour	Ajda Ovat	877	44.3	+8.2
Green	Rose Dakuo	839	42.4	+2.3
Reform	Ian Sinclair	106	5.4	−2.8
Conservative	Kenny Ajao	98	4.9	−4.6
Liberal Democrats	David Schmitz	60	3.0	−3.4
Turnout		1,989	22.4	−9.6
Rejected ballots		9	0.5	
Registered electors		8,898		
Labour gain from Green				

* Ajda Ovat formerly served as a councillor for Northumberland Park ward until 2026, but lost her seat.

=== Woodside ===
A by-election was held on 25 June 2026 as Hasret Bozdogan (Labour) was unable to take up her seat.

Woodside ward by-election, 25 June 2026
Party	Candidate	Votes	%	±%
Green	Elara Shurety	1,033	43.3	+6.0
Labour	Thayahlan Iyngkaran	978	41.0	+3.6
Reform	Ruth Price	171	7.2	−0.2
Conservative	Mikeleno Fureraj	110	4.6	−2.8
Liberal Democrats	Rakeebah Rahim	93	3.9	−7.0
Turnout		2,400	24.4	−11.9
Rejected ballots		13	0.5	
Registered electors		9,855		
Green gain from Labour				

* Thayahlan Iyngkaran formerly served as a councillor for Woodside ward until 2026, but lost his seat.
