= Ben Obese-Jecty =

British politician

Benjamin Obese-Jecty MP
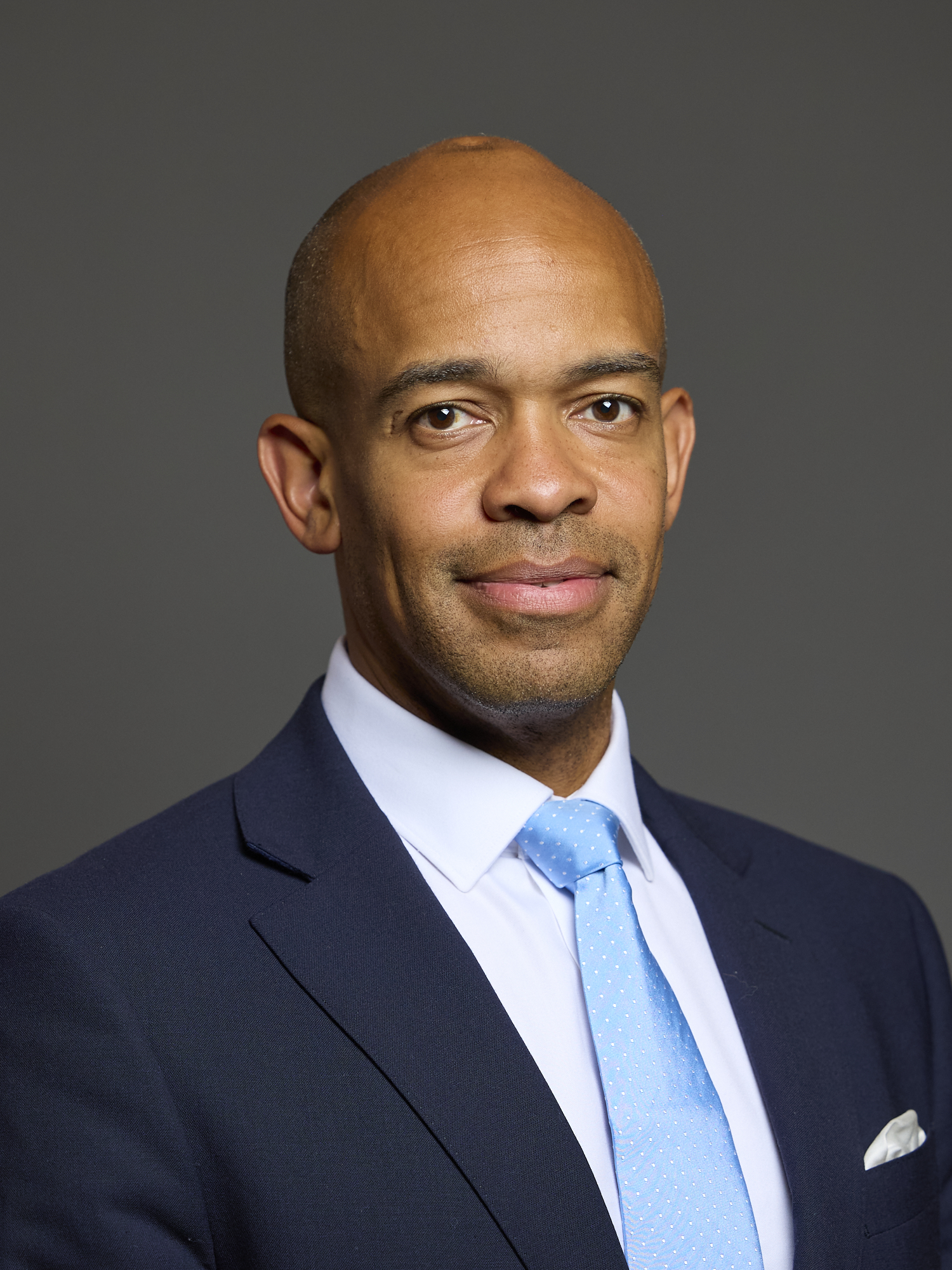
- Official portrait, 2024

Shadow Minister for Defence Procurement
- Incumbent
- Assumed office 2 September 2026
- Leader: Kemi Badenoch

Member of Parliament for Huntingdon
- Incumbent
- Assumed office 4 July 2024
- Preceded by: Jonathan Djanogly
- Majority: 1,499 (2.9%)

Personal details
- Born: September 1979 (age 47) Kingston-upon-Thames, London, England
- Party: Conservative
- Education: Kingston University; Royal Military Academy, Sandhurst
- Website: benobese-jecty.org.uk

Military service
- Allegiance: United Kingdom
- Branch/service: British Army
- Years of service: 2004–2012
- Rank: Captain
- Unit: Duke of Wellington's Regiment; Yorkshire Regiment
- Battles/wars: Iraq War; War in Afghanistan

Benjamin Obese-Jecty (/ˌɒbsiːˈdʒɛktiː/, born September 1979) is a British Conservative politician who has been Member of Parliament (MP) for Huntingdon since 2024. He currently serves as the Shadow Minister for Defence Procurement.

== Early life ==
Obese-Jecty's father was originally Ghanaian and came to Britain on the SS Apapa as a four year old in 1953. Obese-Jecty is mixed race, with his mother being white British. He was educated at Tiffin School, a boys' grammar school in Kingston upon Thames. After attending Kingston University, he joined the British Army.

== Military career ==
Having attended the Royal Military Academy Sandhurst, Obese-Jecty was commissioned as a second lieutenant in the Duke of Wellington's Regiment on 11 December 2004, with seniority in that rank from 15 December 2001. He was promoted to lieutenant on the same day, 11 December 2004, with seniority in that rank from 15 December 2003. He moved to the Yorkshire Regiment after his first regiment was merged with others to form it in 2006. He was promoted to captain on 11 June 2007.

Obese-Jecty served a tour of duty in Iraq as a battle casualty replacement after completing his training. From 2009 to 2010, as part of Operation Herrick 11, he served a tour in Afghanistan in an "embedded partnership role mentoring the Afghan National Army's 2nd Kandak" in Sangin, Helmand Province, with 3RIFLES Battlegroup. Over the six-month tour they sustained the heaviest casualties suffered by a British Army battlegroup since the Korean War.

Obese-Jecty moved to the Regular Army Reserve of Officers on 11 December 2012, thereby ending his active military service.

== Professional career ==
After leaving the British Army in 2012, he moved into banking.

Obese-Jecty spent two years as an academy trustee at Esher Sixth Form College from 2021 to 2023. He was a member of the Veterans Advisory and Pensions Committee for the South West region for a three-year term from February 2021 to February 2024.

== Political career ==
In the 2019 general election, Obese-Jecty was selected for the Conservative Party in the safe Labour seat of Hackney North and Stoke Newington against then Labour Shadow Home Secretary Diane Abbott. He finished second achieving 11.9% of the vote. During the campaign Obese-Jecty was subjected to racial slurs from other black people because he was standing for the Conservative Party.

In the 2022 Haringey London Borough Council election, Obese-Jecty was a Conservative candidate in the Noel Park ward and failed to be elected. In September 2023, Obese-Jecty was selected as the Conservative candidate to succeed Jonathan Djanogly as Member of Parliament (MP) for the safe Conservative seat of Huntingdon.

At the 2024 general election, he was elected with 18,257 votes and a majority of 1,499 over the second-placed Labour candidate.

Obese-Jecty gave his maiden speech on 22 July 2024, during the King's Speech debate on the Economy, Welfare and Public Services.

In the 2024 Conservative leadership election, he endorsed Kemi Badenoch.

In November 2024, Obese-Jecty was made an Assistant Junior Whip in the Opposition Whips Office.

In April 2025, Obese-Jecty tabled a Private Members' Bill (under the Ten Minute Rule), calling for the Government to publish a dedicated strategy for tackling interpersonal abuse and violence against men and boys to support survivors of crimes such as domestic abuse, rape, sexual assault, digital image abuse, forced marriage and honour-based violence, currently considered as violence against women and girls.

Obese-Jecty became the Shadow Parliamentary Private Secretary for Defence in June 2025 moving from the Opposition Whips Office. In July 2025 he was additionally given the role of Shadow Parliamentary Private Secretary for Justice, thereby covering both briefs.

In September 2025, Obese-Jecty was announced to be the number one ranked MP of all 335 new MPs in the Polimonitor leaderboard for the number of parliamentary contributions made during the first year of the 2024 Parliament. He was described by Matt Chorley during an interview on his BBC Radio 5 Live show as "officially the busiest new MP".

During the Second Reading of the Sentencing Bill in October 2025 Obese-Jecty tabled an amendment calling for those convicted of causing death by careless or dangerous driving to receive a lifetime driving ban. The amendment was selected for voting but was voted against by the Government by 167 – 313.

The November 2025 Huntingdon Train Attack took place at Huntingdon Train Station in Obese-Jecty's constituency. He arrived at the scene shortly after the attack had occurred, liaised with emergency services and conducted interviews with national and international media. He criticised rife speculation about the attacker and his motives and called for the identity and background of the attacker to be made public as soon as possible to avoid further speculation.

On 3 November 2025, Obese-Jecty spoke about the attack during an oral statement from the Home Secretary, praising the swift action of the emergency services and the train staff whose quick-thinking had ensured the train was able to stop at Huntingdon.

Following Robert Jenrick's defection to Reform UK in January 2026, Obese-Jecty, who was Jenrick's Parliamentary Private Secretary at the time of the defection, was highly critical of his actions stating that the defection showed him to be "a man of no principles, who’ll say whatever he thinks will help his own career".

In January 2026, following US President Donald Trump's criticism that NATO troops: "stayed a little back, a little off the front lines," Obese-Jecty was one of the first MPs to publicly condemn the comments writing that, "It's sad to see our nation's sacrifice, and that of our NATO partners, held so cheaply by the President of the United States". He went on to describe the comments as "an outrage" and "offensive" during an interview with Times Radio.

In May 2026, Obese-Jecty was again announced as the number one ranked MP in the Polimonitor leaderboard for the number of parliamentary contributions made during the second year of the 2024 Parliament with 3,256 parliamentary contributions with Polimonitor describing it as "by any measure, a remarkable volume".

In June 2026, Obese-Jecty tabled New Clause 5 as an amendment to the Armed Forces Bill calling for the Government to fulfil their manifesto pledge of waiving visa fees for the spouses and children of serving personnel and veterans. Despite widespread cross-party support New Clause 5 was defeated by the Government by 170 – 301.

Later that month he re-tabled the amendment at Report Stage as New Clause 4, this time with cross-party support from 63 MPs. The Government defeated the amendment again, despite reflecting significant changes requested by the Government, by 164 – 311.

In September 2026, following the Shadow Cabinet reshuffle, Obese-Jecty was appointed as the Shadow Minister for Defence Procurement.

== Electoral history ==
General election 2024: Huntingdon
Party	Candidate	Votes	%	±%
Conservative	Ben Obese-Jecty	18,257	35.1	−24.1
Labour	Alex Bulat	16,758	32.2	+11.4
Reform	Sarah Smith	8,039	15.4	N/A
Liberal Democrats	Mark Argent	4,821	9.3	−4.7
Green	Georgie Hunt	3,042	5.8	+2.3
Majority		1,499	2.9	−35.5
Turnout		52,234	66.1	−8.4
Registered electors		79,074		
Conservative hold		Swing	−17.8	

2019 general election: Hackney North and Stoke Newington
Party	Candidate	Votes	%	±%
Labour	Diane Abbott	39,972	70.3	−4.8
Conservative	Benjamin Obese-Jecty	6,784	11.9	−0.8
Green	Alex Armitage	4,989	8.8	+4.2
Liberal Democrats	Ben Mathis^{1}	4,283	7.5	+0.8
Brexit Party	Richard Ings	609	1.1	New
Renew	Haseeb Ur-Rehman	151	0.3	New
Independent	Loré Lixenberg	76	0.1	New
Majority		33,188	58.4	−4.0
Turnout		56,864	61.5	−4.7
Registered electors		92,462		
Labour hold		Swing	-2.1	

^{1}: After the close of nominations, the Liberal Democrats suspended their support for Mathis's candidacy over tweets he made.

Parliament of the United Kingdom
Preceded by Jonathan Djanogly	Member of Parliament for Huntingdon; 2024–present	Incumbent
