= William Blackburne =

British judge

Sir William Anthony Blackburne (born 24 February 1944) is a retired High Court Judge at the Royal Courts of Justice in London Blackburne was Called to the Bar in 1966 from Inner Temple, although a year or two later he joined Lincoln's Inn and eventually became a Queen's Counsel in 1984. He practised from 13 Old Square. Blackburne became a High Court judge in the Chancery Division on 1 October 1993 and retired on 27 October 2009. Since retiring Blackburne sat as a High Court Judge on a part-time basis. He also served as Treasurer (Chairman of the Governing Body) of Lincoln's Inn.

Blackburne is currently associated with Maitland Chambers, formed in 2001 from the merger of 13 Old Square and 7 Stone Buildings, as an arbitrator.

== Early life ==
William Blackburne was born in early 1944 to an English father and Norwegian mother. After schooling in his native Yorkshire, he studied languages and law at the University of Cambridge. He was called to the Bar in October 1966 by the Inner Temple although a year or two later he joined Lincoln's Inn where he had his Chambers. He remained in Chambers in that Inn for the rest of his life at the Bar.

== Career ==
In 1984 Blackburne was appointed Queen's Counsel (i.e. QC). In 1993 he was appointed to the High Court of Justice in London and became a judge of the Chancery Division. He was knighted later that year. Between 1998 and 2003 he was also Vice-Chancellor of the County Palatine of Lancaster and, as such, a member of the council responsible for the administration of the estates belonging to the historic Duchy of Lancaster (a major source of the Queen's private income). As Palatine Vice-Chancellor he had responsibility for the conduct of Chancery business in the North of England. He retired from the Bench in 2009 to devote himself to other causes. In the event, these have included the Chairmanship of the Pakistan Society.

While at the Bar he served as a member of the Bar's professional body, the Bar Council, serving as its treasurer for three years in the late 1980s. He was elected a Bencher (Master of the Bench) of Lincoln's Inn in 1992. In that capacity he was heavily involved in the Inn's governance. He is currently the treasurer (Chairman of the Governing Body of the Lincoln's Inn).

In the late 1970s and again in the late 1980s he served, altogether for 11 years, as a councillor representing Highgate on the London Borough of Haringey. During that time he served on the council's Housing and Finance Committees and was heavily involved in the council's trusteeship of Alexandra Palace, serving on the Alexandra Palace Committee.

== Life after retirement ==
Since retiring from the High Court Bench, he has involved himself in numerous activities. He was and remains a member of the small committee which steered to completion the RAF Bomber Command Memorial in Central London which Queen Elizabeth II opened in June 2012 and which is dedicated to the memory of the 55,500 or so persons (British and overseas) who gave their lives in the service of RAF Bomber Command during World War II. Music has also long been a great interest. In 2011 he was elected to serve a two-year term (which expired later in 2013) as President of the Madrigal Society, a musical society founded in 1741 and which is reputed to be the oldest in the UK. After joining the Pakistan Society some 20 or more years ago he was elected its chairman in 2012. He took up this office on the retirement of Lt-General Anthony Palmer (British Army officer) in October 2012.

He is a member of the Alpine Club and of a small climbing club based in North Wales. As he gets older he devotes himself increasingly to gardening under the tutelage of his wife, Vivien. He and Vivien (they have no children) enjoy travelling. When time permits they also love to visit the theatre, cinema, concert halls and opera houses. They have homes in Richmond and West Derbyshire.

== Notable cases ==
=== HRH Prince of Wales v Associated Newspapers ===
The Prince of Wales sought a judgement against Associated Newspapers Limited (now DMG Media), for breach of confidence and infringement of copyright following a series of articles in The Mail on Sunday based on excerpts a diary Prince Charles had written while on a visit to Hong Kong between 27 June and 3 July 1997.

In Prince of Wales v Associated Newspapers Ltd Blackburne found that Article 10 of the Human Rights Act 1998, which affirms the freedom of the press, "carries responsibilities, one of which is preventing the disclosure of information received in confidence". Blackburne weighted up Articles 8 and 10 of the Act and found that Article 8, the "Right to respect for private and family life", outweighed Article 10 "Freedom of expression".

Blackburne's decision was upheld on appeal.

=== Abbey Forwarding ===
Blackburne heard application made by HM Revenue and Customs (HMRC) on 4 February 2009 and was persuaded to liquidate Abbey Forwarding Ltd having been told by HMRC that:

Abbey was at the heart of the fraudulent activity; that its directors were living beyond their declared means; and that the directors were fraudsters who might move assets and cash and destroy evidence.

Later a different Judge, Kim Lewison, was asked to determine if the HMRC's claims were true. He found that they were false.

=== Shirayama Shokusan Company Limited and Others v Danovo Limited ===
In the case of Shirayama Shokusan Company Limited and Others v Danovo Limited in a judgement dated 5 December 2003 Blackburne ordered the parties to enter mediation. It is reportedly notable that Blackburne stated he had no doubt of the court's jurisdiction to make such a ruling

=== Hollicourt (Contracts) Ltd v Bank of Ireland ===
See: Hollicourt (Contracts) Ltd v Bank of Ireland
