= 1986 Haringey London Borough Council election =

1986 local election in England

The 1986 Haringey Council election took place on 8 May 1986 to elect members of Haringey London Borough Council in London, England. The whole council was up for election and the Labour party retained overall control of the council.

== Election result ==
Haringey local election result 1986
Party	Seats	Gains	Losses	Net gain/loss	Seats %	Votes %	Votes	+/−
Labour	42	13	4	+9				
Conservative	16	3	13	-10				
Alliance	1	1	0	+1				
Green	0	0	0	±0				
United Independent Group	0	0	0	±0				
Humanist	0	0	0	±0				
Communist	0	0	0	±0				
Independent	0	0	0	±0				

== Ward results ==
=== Alexandra ===
Alexandra (3)
Party	Candidate	Votes	%	±%
Labour	Pauline Crossan	1,480	34.2	+6.5
Labour	Peter Kane	1,431	33.1	+5.9
Labour	Brendan McGinley	1,383	32.0	+5.2
Alliance (Liberal)	Paul Lucraft	1,307	30.2	+4.0
Conservative	Lynn Driscoll	1,298	30.0	−12.0
Conservative	Guy Esnouf	1,282	29.6	−12.3
Alliance (SDP)	Derek Pollard	1,253	29.0	+2.9
Conservative	Wayne Lewis	1,252	28.9	−12.7
Alliance (Liberal)	Stuart Sime	1,221	28.2	+2.3
Green	Joycelyn Cunningham	292	6.7	N/A
Turnout		4,327	59.1	+7.3
Labour gain from Conservative		Swing		
Labour gain from Conservative		Swing		
Labour gain from Conservative		Swing		

=== Archway ===
Archway (2)
Party	Candidate	Votes	%	±%
Labour	Nicky Gavron	1,045	37.2	+10.1
Conservative	Ronald Embleton	986	35.1	−8.4
Labour	Stephen Mackey	972	34.6	+8.4
Conservative	Sarah Whitby*	951	33.8	−8.9
Alliance (SDP)	Roger Mothersdale	595	21.2	−4.1
Alliance (Liberal)	Jonathan Hobbs	592	21.1	−2.9
Green	Paul Butler	167	5.9	+2.8
Turnout		2,810	52.3	−1.4
Labour gain from Conservative		Swing		
Conservative hold		Swing		

=== Bowes Park ===
Bowes Park (3)
Party	Candidate	Votes	%	±%
Labour	Pat Craig-Jones	1,811	39.5	+5.0
Labour	Kevin Hargreaves	1,738	37.9	+3.0
Conservative	Amory Toogood	1,645	35.9	−5.4
Conservative	Geoffrey Davis	1,634	35.6	−5.4
Conservative	Margaret Reid	1,632	35.6	−4.6
Labour	Dave Perkin	1,612	35.1	+1.9
Alliance (Liberal)	David Green	839	18.3	−1.4
Alliance (SDP)	John Warren	796	17.4	−1.6
Alliance (SDP)	David Beacham	743	16.2	−1.9
Green	Simon Cowell-Parker	181	3.9	N/A
United Independent Group	Peter Diacopoulos	67	1.5	N/A
Turnout		4,587	52.1	+5.8
Labour gain from Conservative		Swing		
Labour gain from Conservative		Swing		
Conservative hold		Swing		

=== Bruce Grove ===
Bruce Grove (3)
Party	Candidate	Votes	%	±%
Labour	Bernie Grant*	1,748	43.7	−8.3
Labour	Vince Gillespie	1,728	43.2	−7.4
Labour	Martha Osamor	1,673	41.8	−8.6
Conservative	Bryan Morris**	1,066	26.6	+6.7
Conservative	Joseph Smith	1,017	25.4	+5.5
Conservative	Joseph Tadrous	877	21.9	+2.5
Alliance (Liberal)	John Hammond	788	19.7	−2.8
Alliance (Liberal)	Yasmin Ahmed	774	19.3	−1.6
Alliance (SDP)	Stuart Maxwell	739	18.5	−2.4
Green	Donald Nicholls	252	6.3	N/A
United Independent Group	Walter Hurry	96	2.4	N/A
Turnout		4,003	48.1	+12.6
Labour hold		Swing		
Labour hold		Swing		
Labour hold		Swing		

Bryan Morris was a sitting councillor for Highgate ward.

=== Coleraine ===
Coleraine (3)
Party	Candidate	Votes	%	±%
Liberal	Alexander L'Estrange	1,656	38.4	+19.8
Labour	Stephen Banerji*	1,587	36.8	−4.7
Labour	Beth Simons*	1,566	36.3	−1.1
Labour	Patrick Tonge*	1,510	35.0	−1.4
Alliance (Liberal)	Susan Curtis	1,398	32.4	+13.8
Alliance (Liberal)	Attila Borzak	1,383	32.1	+14.1
Conservative	Patrick Callan	695	16.1	−17.3
Conservative	Mary Callan	689	16.0	−16.8
Independent	Edward Sambridge	472	11.0	N/A
Green	Nina Armstrong	106	2.5	N/A
Turnout		4,309	52.1	+13.2
Liberal gain from Labour		Swing		
Labour hold		Swing		
Labour hold		Swing		

=== Crouch End ===
Crouch End (3)
Party	Candidate	Votes	%	±%
Labour	Paul Loach**	1,385	34.9	+4.1
Labour	Davina Cooper	1,345	33.9	+3.1
Labour	Mary Neuner	1,329	33.5	+3.3
Conservative	Ronald Aitken	1,307	32.9	−6.5
Conservative	Iain Dewar	1,256	31.6	−6.8
Conservative	Edward Webb	1,222	30.8	−7.1
Alliance (SDP)	Colin Croly	880	22.2	−0.9
Alliance (SDP)	Melvyn Kaufman	878	22.1	+0.1
Alliance (SDP)	Colin Martin	848	21.3	±0.0
Green	David Burns	407	10.2	+5.1
Humanist	Jon Swinden	76	1.9	N/A
Turnout		3,972	55.8	+4.1
Labour gain from Conservative		Swing		
Labour gain from Conservative		Swing		
Labour gain from Conservative		Swing		

Paul Loach was a sitting councillor for Seven Sisters ward.

=== Fortis Green ===
Fortis Green (3)
Party	Candidate	Votes	%	±%
Conservative	Roger Dix	1,680	43.1	−3.6
Conservative	Jeffrey Lotery*	1,680	43.1	−1.6
Conservative	Gerard Tyler	1,588	40.7	−3.4
Labour	Petrina Williams	1,061	27.2	+2.8
Labour	Robert Monroe	1,058	27.1	+3.4
Labour	Richard Heffernan	1,055	27.0	+4.5
Alliance (SDP)	Robert Andrewes	897	23.0	−1.7
Alliance (Liberal)	Philip Lewis	874	22.4	−1.8
Alliance (SDP)	Thomas Munch-Petersen	850	21.8	−1.1
Green	Doris Binyon	293	7.5	N/A
Turnout		3,901	52.2	−2.4
Conservative hold		Swing		
Conservative hold		Swing		
Conservative hold		Swing		

=== Green Lanes ===
Green Lanes (2)
Party	Candidate	Votes	%	±%
Labour	Anne Douglas	1,488	57.9	+2.4
Labour	Andreas Mikkides*	1,462	56.9	+1.3
Conservative	Asma Siwani	633	24.6	−0.2
Conservative	Sushil Vig	629	24.5	+2.6
Alliance (SDP)	Jill Adler	270	10.5	−5.6
Alliance (Liberal)	Ann Savage	256	10.0	−4.2
United Independent Group	Demetrious Paulou	51	2.0	N/A
Turnout		2,569	43.2	+7.2
Labour hold		Swing		
Labour hold		Swing		

=== Harringay ===
Harringay (3)
Party	Candidate	Votes	%	±%
Labour	Ronald Blanchard*	1,827	54.7	+0.3
Labour	Sharon Lawrence**	1,799	53.9	−3.9
Labour	Chris Zissimos*	1,651	49.4	−4.8
Conservative	Christine Sampson	766	22.9	+1.8
Conservative	Ines Demopoulos	696	20.8	−0.1
Conservative	Zerin Ahmed	688	20.6	−0.1
Alliance (SDP)	Pamela Sweeney	384	11.5	−4.1
Alliance (SDP)	Wendy Beauchamp-Ward	377	11.3	−2.9
Alliance (SDP)	David Withey	329	9.9	−3.3
Green	David Crucefix	199	6.0	N/A
Communist	Francis Carr	193	5.8	−0.2
United Independent Group	Themis Demetriou	105	3.1	N/A
Humanist	Brian Easton	47	1.4	N/A
Turnout		3,340	41.3	−1.1
Labour hold		Swing		
Labour hold		Swing		
Labour hold		Swing		

Sharon Lawrence was a sitting councillor for Alexandra ward.

=== High Cross ===
High Cross (2)
Party	Candidate	Votes	%	±%
Labour	Robert Harris**	1,138	47.0	−3.4
Labour	Kenneth Layne	1,081	44.6	−1.1
Conservative	Frederick Gray	626	25.8	+2.4
Conservative	Mary Raleigh	558	23.0	+0.3
Alliance (Liberal)	Stephen Holdstock	543	22.4	+0.9
Alliance (Liberal)	Elizabeth Mould	520	21.5	+3.0
Turnout		2,422	47.5	+8.6
Labour hold		Swing		
Labour hold		Swing		

Robert Harris was a sitting councillor for Bruce Grove ward.

=== Highgate ===
Highgate (2)
Party	Candidate	Votes	%	±%
Conservative	Andrew Mitchell*	1,429	58.2	+2.0
Conservative	William Blackburne	1,380	56.2	+1.2
Labour	Dennis Bradley	488	19.9	+8.8
Alliance (Liberal)	Francis Coleman	438	17.8	−8.1
Alliance (SDP)	Clare Croly	423	17.2	−7.6
Labour	Danny Nicol	422	17.2	+6.2
Green	Miriam Kennet	115	4.7	N/A
Turnout		2,454	48.9	−5.6
Conservative hold		Swing		
Conservative hold		Swing		

=== Hornsey Central ===
Hornsey Central (2)
Party	Candidate	Votes	%	±%
Labour	Toby Harris*	1,178	39.5	−2.2
Labour	Diana Minns	1,086	36.4	−8.5
Conservative	Gareth Hughes	854	28.6	−5.3
Conservative	Robert Crossman	836	28.0	−4.2
Alliance (SDP)	Michael Garton-Sprenger	519	17.4	+1.0
Alliance (SDP)	Claire Kaufman	513	17.2	+1.3
Green	Maureen Cantwell	241	8.1	+5.4
Independent	Brian Bullard*	221	7.4	−37.5
United Independent Group	Pearl Hurry**	90	3.0	N/A
Turnout		2,981	55.4	+1.5
Labour hold		Swing		
Labour hold		Swing		

Pearl Hurry was a sitting councillor for the Bowes Park ward. She was originally elected as a Conservative. Brian Bullard was originally elected for the Labour Party.

=== Hornsey Vale ===
Hornsey Vale (2)
Party	Candidate	Votes	%	±%
Labour	Steve King*	1,319	51.4	+12.2
Labour	Craig Brewin	1,284	50.0	+6.4
Conservative	Peter Gilbert	686	26.7	−7.0
Conservative	Paul Walker	655	25.5	−7.9
Alliance (SDP)	Alfred White	298	11.6	−4.4
Alliance (Liberal)	Joan Booth	289	11.3	−3.7
Green	Dennis Bury	196	7.6	N/A
Turnout		2,567	52.6	+5.8
Labour hold		Swing		
Labour hold		Swing		

=== Muswell Hill ===
Muswell Hill (3)
Party	Candidate	Votes	%	±%
Conservative	Benjamin Hall*	1,876	41.1	−5.9
Conservative	Blair Greaves	1,827	40.0	−5.8
Conservative	Aeronwy Harris*	1,807	39.5	−6.4
Labour	Michael Ellman	1,404	30.7	+6.7
Labour	Andrew Krokou	1,271	27.8	+4.1
Labour	Nigel Willmott	1,230	26.9	+3.4
Alliance (Liberal)	Anne Williams	1,019	22.3	−4.0
Alliance (SDP)	Jonathan Popper	987	21.6	−4.0
Alliance (SDP)	Ralph Shafran	982	21.5	−3.4
Green	Jennifer Burns	472	10.3	N/A
Humanist	Roger Park	65	1.4	N/A
Turnout		4,570	54.4	−1.4
Conservative hold		Swing		
Conservative hold		Swing		
Conservative hold		Swing		

=== Noel Park ===
Noel Park (3)
Party	Candidate	Votes	%	±%
Labour	John Brennan*	1,760	39.2	−3.3
Labour	Nigel Knowles*	1,747	38.9	−1.6
Labour	Narendra Makanji*	1,650	36.7	−3.0
Conservative	William Golden	1,641	36.5	−0.5
Conservative	Mary Poole-Wilson	1,542	34.3	−2.5
Conservative	Sybil Silver	1,521	33.9	−2.2
Alliance (SDP)	Edward Young	760	16.9	+1.7
Alliance (SDP)	John Fakes	758	16.9	+1.8
Alliance (Liberal)	Deborah Aleksander	681	15.2	+1.2
Green	Claire Lewis	147	3.3	N/A
United Independent Group	John Edwards	77	1.7	N/A
Turnout		4,492	53.3	+8.3
Labour hold		Swing		
Labour hold		Swing		
Labour hold		Swing		

=== Park ===
Park (2)
Party	Candidate	Votes	%	±%
Labour	Eileen Garwood*	1,128	47.5	−2.4
Labour	Peter Clarke	1,031	43.4	−2.1
Conservative	Brian Boyle	854	35.9	+3.4
Conservative	Margaret Carr	817	34.4	+2.7
Alliance (Liberal)	Alfred White	296	12.5	−1.8
Alliance (SDP)	Joan Booth	270	11.4	−2.6
Turnout		2,377	44.9	+6.0
Labour hold		Swing		
Labour hold		Swing		

=== Seven Sisters ===
Seven Sisters (2)
Party	Candidate	Votes	%	±%
Labour	Frederick Knight*	1,145	57.0	−4.3
Labour	Vernon King	1,030	51.2	−3.3
Conservative	Lawrence Allright	506	25.2	+4.8
Conservative	Francis Wanwingkai	424	21.1	+2.3
Alliance (Liberal)	Edmund Green	267	13.3	−4.0
Alliance (SDP)	John Gray	247	12.3	−3.9
Turnout		2,010	41.3	+6.1
Labour hold		Swing		
Labour hold		Swing		

=== South Hornsey ===
South Hornsey (2)
Party	Candidate	Votes	%	±%
Labour	Philip Jones*	1,404	53.9	+8.0
Labour	Eddie Griffith	1,317	50.6	+8.5
Conservative	Ian Morrison	666	25.6	−7.3
Conservative	Christopher Stone	586	22.5	−9.4
Alliance (SDP)	Anne Manger	313	12.0	−3.0
Alliance (Liberal)	Valerie Silbiger	249	9.6	−5.3
Green	Verity Smith	166	6.4	N/A
Turnout		2,604	52.1	−0.1
Labour hold		Swing		
Labour hold		Swing		

=== South Tottenham ===
South Tottenham (2)
Party	Candidate	Votes	%	±%
Labour	Harry Lister	1,379	48.2	+9.5
Labour	Viv Fenwick**	1,354	47.3	+9.1
Conservative	Michael Coney*	1,156	40.4	−4.7
Conservative	Walter Taylor**	1,015	35.5	−2.5
Alliance (Liberal)	Anthony Barter	197	6.9	−5.4
Alliance (SDP)	John Siraut	165	5.8	−5.8
Green	Lee Williams	100	3.5	N/A
Turnout		2,863	51.3	+4.0
Labour gain from Conservative		Swing		
Labour hold		Swing		

Viv Fenwick was a sitting councillor for Hornsey Vale ward. Walter Taylor was a sitting councillor for West Green ward.

=== Tottenham Central ===
Tottenham Central (3)
Party	Candidate	Votes	%	±%
Labour	Roger Harris	1,685	45.1	−7.8
Labour	David McCulloch*	1,675	44.9	−7.6
Labour	John Moore	1,577	42.2	−9.2
Conservative	John Lee	890	23.8	−1.7
Alliance (SDP)	Philip Hawker	857	23.0	+8.8
Conservative	Grace Middleton	851	22.8	−2.2
Alliance (SDP)	Anthony Rigby	758	20.3	+7.5
Alliance (SDP)	Margaret Simon	742	19.9	+12.0
Conservative	Monica White	703	18.8	−5.9
Green	Jon White	162	4.3	N/A
Turnout		3,733	46.6	+10.8
Labour hold		Swing		
Labour hold		Swing		
Labour hold		Swing		

=== West Green ===
West Green (3)
Party	Candidate	Votes	%	±%
Conservative	Ronald Bell	1,854	43.3	+2.4
Labour	Peter Chalk	1,786	41.7	+4.3
Conservative	Mary Salim*	1,786	41.7	+1.4
Labour	Ray Dodds	1,740	40.7	+5.9
Conservative	William Band	1,735	40.5	−0.3
Labour	Peter Hall	1,701	39.7	+6.4
Alliance (SDP)	Tony Clark	440	10.3	−8.8
Alliance (Liberal)	Joanna Cooke	404	9.4	−7.2
Alliance (SDP)	Kevin Twaite	332	7.8	−8.3
Green	Richard Warren	200	4.7	N/A
Turnout		4,280	50.3	+5.8
Conservative hold		Swing		
Labour gain from Conservative		Swing		
Conservative hold		Swing		

=== White Hart Lane ===
White Hart Lane (3)
Party	Candidate	Votes	%	±%
Conservative	Peter Murphy	1,827	47.6	+13.1
Conservative	Diane Harwood	1,783	46.4	+12.3
Conservative	Donald Shirley	1,764	45.9	+13.2
Labour	Vic Butler*	1,300	33.8	−10.3
Labour	Maureen Dewar*	1,178	30.7	−12.0
Labour	Max Morris*	1,142	29.7	−11.1
Alliance (SDP)	Kenneth Shepherd	523	13.6	−1.7
Alliance (SDP)	Dean Overton	441	11.5	−2.9
Alliance (SDP)	Marc Bernstein	431	11.2	−3.1
Turnout		3,842	51.7	+12.1
Conservative gain from Labour		Swing		
Conservative gain from Labour		Swing		
Conservative gain from Labour		Swing		

=== Woodside ===
Woodside (3)
Party	Candidate	Votes	%	±%
Conservative	Bernard Dehnel*	1,758	41.9	−1.1
Labour	Jim Gardner*	1,739	41.4	+4.9
Labour	Peter Doble	1,670	39.8	+4.5
Labour	Adelaide Leslie	1,617	38.5	+3.3
Conservative	Irma Rupe	1,546	36.8	−4.9
Conservative	Ivars Svillis	1,537	36.6	−4.9
Alliance (SDP)	Jane Greig	532	12.7	−4.4
Alliance (SDP)	Leonard Schmid	468	11.1	−4.6
Alliance (Liberal)	Nicholas Aleksander	355	8.5	−6.0
United Independent Group	Andras Chrysostomou	84	2.0	N/A
Turnout		4,198	55.1	+11.9
Conservative hold		Swing		
Labour gain from Conservative		Swing		
Labour gain from Conservative		Swing		

== By-elections ==
Noel Park by-election, 16 July 1987
Party	Candidate	Votes	%	±%
Conservative	William Golden	2,008	53.6	+17.1
Labour	Linda Clarke	1,479	39.5	+0.6
Alliance	Ernest Cady	211	5.6	−11.3
Green	Claire Lewis	46	1.2	−2.1
Turnout			44.21	
Conservative gain from Labour		Swing		

The by-election was called following the resignation of Cllr Nigel Knowles.

Coleraine by-election, 10 September 1987
Party	Candidate	Votes	%	±%
Labour	Maureen Dewar	1,109	40.6	+4.3
Alliance	Attila Borzak	842	30.9	−1.2
Conservative	Mary Raleigh	724	26.5	+10.4
Green	Nina Armstrong	54	2.0	−0.5
Turnout			32.24	
Labour hold		Swing		

The by-election was called following the resignation of Cllr Beth Simons.

Green Lanes by-election, 10 September 1987
Party	Candidate	Votes	%	±%
Labour	Patrick Tonge	695	46.1	−11.8
Conservative	Nityanand Ragnuth	662	43.9	+19.3
Alliance	Philip Minshull	96	6.4	−4.1
Green	David Burns	55	3.6	N/A
Turnout			25.38	
Labour hold		Swing		

The by-election was called following the resignation of Cllr Anne Douglas.

Fortis Green by-election, 17 December 1987
Party	Candidate	Votes	%	±%
Conservative	Mary Poole-Wilson	1,375	61.8	+18.7
Labour	Richard Heffernan	538	24.2	−2.8
Alliance	Robert Andrews	214	9.6	−13.4
Green	Miriam Kennet	97	4.4	−3.1
Turnout			29.43	
Conservative hold		Swing		

The by-election was called following the resignation of Cllr Jeffrey Lotery.

Bruce Grove by-election, 7 July 1988
Party	Candidate	Votes	%	±%
Labour	Ian Willmore	1,209	48.9	+5.2
Conservative	Joseph Smith	887	35.9	+10.5
Liberal Democrats	Elizabeth Mould	230	9.3	−10.4
Green	Donald Nicholls	133	5.4	−0.9
Independent	Paul Patterson	14	0.6	N/A
Turnout			29.25	
Labour hold		Swing		

The by-election was called following the resignation of Cllr Bernie Grant.

Bowes Park by-election, 6 October 1988
Party	Candidate	Votes	%	±%
Conservative	Terrence Pope	1,265	48.8	+13.2
Labour	Polydoros Polydorou	947	36.5	−3.0
Liberal Democrats	Deborah Aleksander	233	9.0	−9.3
Green	Jonathan Dobres	147	5.7	+1.8
Turnout			29.52	
Conservative gain from Labour		Swing		

The by-election was called following the resignation of Cllr Pat Craig-Jones.

Crouch End by-election, 6 October 1988
Party	Candidate	Votes	%	±%
Conservative	Ronald Aitken	1,269	52.6	+19.7
Labour	Paul Head	839	34.8	−0.1
Green	David Burns	162	6.7	−3.5
Liberal Democrats	Anne Williams	143	5.9	−16.3
Turnout			34.89	
Conservative gain from Labour		Swing		

The by-election was called following the resignation of Cllr Paul Loach.

Woodside by-election, 9 February 1989
Party	Candidate	Votes	%	±%
Conservative	Jim Buckley	1,419	53.5	+11.6
Labour	Jobaidur Rahman	1,126	42.4	+3.9
Liberal Democrats	Nicholas Aleksander	109	4.1	−4.4
Turnout			35.48	
Conservative hold		Swing		

The by-election was called following the resignation of Cllr Bernard Dehnel.
