= 1998 Haringey London Borough Council election =

- 7 May 1998

All 59 seats up for election to Haringey London Borough Council 25 seats needed for a majority
- Registered: 145,012
- Turnout: 44,192, 30.47% (▼12.72)

	First party	Second party	Third party
Leader	Toby Harris	Unknown	Unknown
Party	Labour	Liberal Democrats	Conservative
Leader since	1987	Unknown	Unknown
Leader's seat	Hornsey Central	Unknown	Unknown
Last election	57 seats, 60.08%	0 seats, 12.40%	2 seats, 23.15%
Seats won	54	3	2
Seat change	▼3	▲3	Steady
Popular vote	62,134	16,430	19,202
Percentage	59.66%	15.78%	18.44%
Swing	▼0.42	▲3.38	▼4.71
Council control before election
Labour
Council control after election
Labour

The 1998 Haringey Council election took place on 7 May 1998 to elect members of Haringey London Borough Council in London, England. The whole council was up for election and the Labour party stayed in overall control of the council.

== Background ==
Following their landslide victory in the 1994 elections, Labour were defending 57 of the 59 seats on Haringey Council. At these elections the Conservatives successfully defended their two seats in Highgate ward, but failed to regain any others. The Liberal Democrats became the official opposition after winning three seats in Muswell Hill ward, their first ever on Haringey Council. One of these three councillors was Lynne Featherstone, who would go on to become MP for Hornsey and Wood Green.

== Election result ==
Haringey London Borough Council Elections results 1998
Party	Seats	Gains	Losses	Net gain/loss	Seats %	Votes %	Votes	+/−
Labour	54	0	3	▼3	91.53	59.66	62,134	▼0.42
Liberal Democrats	3	3	0	▲3	5.08	15.78	16,430	▲3.38
Conservative	2	0	0	Steady	3.39	18.44	19,202	▼4.71
Green	0	0	0	Steady	0.00	4.71	4,902	▲0.64
Socialist Labour	0	0	0	Steady	0.00	1.24	1,288	New
Independent	0	0	0	Steady	0.00	0.17	181	▼0.13
Total	59						104,137	

== Ward results ==
=== Alexandra ===
Alexandra (3)
Party	Candidate	Votes	%	±%
Labour	Catherine Craig*	1,294	52.1	+1.9
Labour	Mary Neuner*	1,178	47.4	±0.0
Labour	Peter Droussioutis	1,106	44.5	+4.1
Conservative	Jeremy Boardman	591	23.8	+0.8
Conservative	Daniel Janner	569	22.9	+0.9
Conservative	Anthony Keogh	566	22.8	−0.9
Liberal Democrats	Susan Oatway	530	21.3	−6.5
Liberal Democrats	Eleanor Hogg	484	19.5	−3.6
Liberal Democrats	Roger Salmons	417	16.8	−5.6
Green	Paul Butler	346	13.9	+2.8
Turnout		2,497	37.6	−18.5
Labour hold				
Labour hold				
Labour hold				

=== Archway ===
Archway (2)
Party	Candidate	Votes	%	±%
Labour	Judith Bax*	891	45.5	−1.0
Labour	Nicolette Gavron*	868	44.3	−12.6
Conservative	Roderick Allen	644	32.9	+3.6
Conservative	Michael Flynn	605	30.9	+5.1
Liberal Democrats	Jonathan Bloch	283	14.4	−3.8
Liberal Democrats	Roger Mothersdale	240	12.3	N/A
Green	Sally Child	183	9.3	−4.6
Turnout		1,971	37.3	−10.2
Labour hold				
Labour hold				

=== Bowes Park ===
Bowes Park (3)
Party	Candidate	Votes	%	±%
Labour	Lucinda Arnold*	1,407	57.3	+3.2
Labour	Thomas Davidson**	1,397	56.9	+9.3
Labour	Vivienne Manheim*	1,369	55.8	+0.7
Liberal Democrats	David Beacham	413	16.8	+4.8
Conservative	David Grant	402	16.4	−9.8
Liberal Democrats	David Garratt	397	16.2	+5.1
Conservative	Kenneth Mansfield	373	15.2	−8.6
Conservative	Patricia Mansfield	344	14.0	−9.5
Liberal Democrats	Wayne Hoban	341	13.9	+4.0
Green	Hilary Jago	226	9.2	+0.2
Turnout		2,481	29.6	−16.4
Labour hold				
Labour hold				
Labour hold				

Thomas Davidson was a sitting councillor for Fortis Green ward

=== Bruce Grove ===
Bruce Grove (3)
Party	Candidate	Votes	%	±%
Labour	Irene Robertson	1,482	79.8	+12.2
Labour	Herbert Brown	1,424	76.7	+14.3
Labour	Stephen Brasher*	1,408	75.9	+8.1
Green	Peter Budge	299	16.1	+3.9
Conservative	Aeronwy Harris	269	14.5	+2.0
Socialist Labour	Angela Young	248	13.4	N/A
Turnout		1,879	25.8	−11.5
Labour hold				
Labour hold				
Labour hold				

=== Coleraine ===
Coleraine (3)
Party	Candidate	Votes	%	±%
Labour	Maureen Dewar*	1,083	67.4	+9.0
Labour	Reginald Rice*	1,035	64.4	+11.3
Labour	Bernice Vanier**	879	54.7	+2.2
Liberal Democrats	Isabel de Sudea	242	15.1	−20.6
Conservative	Lloyda Fanusie	228	14.2	N/A
Liberal Democrats	Nicholas Aleksander	220	13.7	−15.0
Liberal Democrats	Arwa Hassan	189	11.8	−16.0
Green	Peter McAskie	176	11.0	+3.9
Turnout		1,616	22.9	−20.3
Labour hold				
Labour hold				
Labour hold				

Bernice Vanier was a sitting councillor for Tottenham Central ward

=== Crouch End ===
Crouch End (3)
Party	Candidate	Votes	%	±%
Labour	Charles Sharp*	1,247	52.5	+2.2
Labour	Nigel Willmott*	1,175	49.5	+0.3
Labour	Colin Sandbach	1,109	46.7	−3.8
Conservative	Blair Greaves	532	22.4	−4.6
Liberal Democrats	Roderick Benziger	474	20.0	+4.4
Conservative	Edward Webb	463	19.5	−3.6
Conservative	Paul Stephenson	462	19.5	−5.5
Liberal Democrats	Frank Heller	439	18.5	+3.1
Green	Steve Marchen	410	17.3	+2.6
Liberal Democrats	Michael Willett	378	15.9	+2.1
Turnout		2,392	32.6	−13.8
Labour hold				
Labour hold				
Labour hold				

=== Fortis Green ===
Fortis Green (3)
Party	Candidate	Votes	%	±%
Labour	Alan Richardson	1,170	44.5	+1.3
Labour	Susan Eedle	1,155	43.9	+1.0
Labour	David Prendergast	1,041	39.6	+0.2
Conservative	Ronald Aitken	830	31.6	−2.2
Conservative	Juliet Donnelly	814	31.0	−2.5
Conservative	Roger Smethurst	769	29.3	−1.7
Liberal Democrats	Matthew Bell	497	18.9	+1.4
Liberal Democrats	Mary Hort	487	18.5	N/A
Liberal Democrats	Walter Bealby	420	16.0	−2.9
Green	Daniel James	289	11.0	−3.6
Turnout		2,641	38.7	−6.8
Labour hold				
Labour hold				
Labour hold				

=== Green Lanes ===
Green Lanes (2)
Party	Candidate	Votes	%	±%
Labour	Neil Cleeveley*	890	66.1	−3.5
Labour	Brian Haley*	862	64.0	−3.0
Green	Laura Davenport	306	22.7	+12.1
Conservative	Georgina Walden	224	16.6	+1.0
Turnout		1,361	25.9	−11.6
Labour hold				
Labour hold				

=== Harringay ===
Harringay (3)
Party	Candidate	Votes	%	±%
Labour	Gina Adamou*	1,288	60.8	−10.9
Labour	Ronald Blanchard*	1,169	55.2	−13.0
Labour	Takki Sulaiman	1,032	48.7	−20.7
Green	Robert Kozma	448	21.2	N/A
Liberal Democrats	Josina van der Valk	423	20.0	+7.0
Conservative	Betty Cooper	310	14.6	−0.1
Socialist Labour	Warren Taylor	277	13.1	N/A
Conservative	Kenneth King	265	12.5	+0.4
Turnout		2,141	28.6	−11.4
Labour hold				
Labour hold				
Labour hold				

=== High Cross ===
High Cross (2)
Party	Candidate	Votes	%	±%
Labour	Alan Stanton	755	64.4	−3.2
Labour	Isidoros Diakides*	740	63.1	+2.3
Conservative	Jean Farmer	234	20.0	−0.7
Liberal Democrats	Anthony Leliw	203	17.3	+4.2
Turnout		1,194	23.8	−13.3
Labour hold				
Labour hold				

=== Highgate ===
Highgate (2)
Party	Candidate	Votes	%	±%
Conservative	Peter Forrest*	728	44.7	−2.4
Conservative	William MacDougall	712	43.7	−4.1
Labour	Russell Morris	518	31.8	−2.7
Labour	Bernard Millar	508	31.2	+2.4
Liberal Democrats	Pauline Wearden	280	17.2	−1.2
Liberal Democrats	Jeremy Browne	252	15.5	N/A
Green	William Molesworth	128	7.9	−2.6
Turnout		1,635	35.4	−7.4
Conservative hold				
Conservative hold				

=== Hornsey Central ===
Hornsey Central (2)
Party	Candidate	Votes	%	±%
Labour	Toby Harris*	846	50.1	−12.8
Labour	Catherine Stafford	806	47.7	−11.3
Liberal Democrats	Lindsay Northover	293	17.4	+5.8
Green	Mary Hogan	247	14.6	+3.1
Conservative	Catherine MacDougall	242	14.3	−6.2
Conservative	Harish Davda	231	13.7	−6.5
Liberal Democrats	Mark Pack	219	13.0	N/A
Green	Karine Pellaumail	247	14.6	N/A
Socialist Labour	Patrick Sikorski	88	5.2	N/A
Turnout		1,693	32.4	−17.6
Labour hold				
Labour hold				

=== Hornsey Vale ===
Hornsey Vale (2)
Party	Candidate	Votes	%	±%
Labour	Josephine Irwin*	1,028	61.8	−3.6
Labour	Simon Horne*	900	54.1	−9.5
Green	Ursula Bury	279	16.8	+4.5
Liberal Democrats	John Northover	261	15.7	+1.4
Conservative	David Douglas	179	10.8	−1.0
Liberal Democrats	Nigel Scott	174	10.5	−1.9
Conservative	Paul Walker	174	10.5	−1.6
Socialist Labour	Jeffrey Wells	113	6.8	N/A
Turnout		1,670	35.5	−11.8
Labour hold				
Labour hold				

=== Muswell Hill ===
Muswell Hill (3)
Party	Candidate	Votes	%	±%
Liberal Democrats	June Andersen	1,942	52.6	+35.0
Liberal Democrats	Lynne Featherstone	1,906	51.6	+34.7
Liberal Democrats	Julia Glenn	1,731	46.9	+30.0
Labour	Elizabeth Singleton**	1,111	30.1	−14.4
Labour	David Jackson	1,027	27.8	−13.2
Labour	Craig Turton*	1,023	27.7	−13.1
Conservative	Michaela Anderson	494	13.4	−18.6
Conservative	Alan Saggerson	461	12.5	−18.4
Conservative	Carl Richmond	460	12.5	−19.4
Green	Jennifer Burns	388	10.5	−1.7
Socialist Labour	Vivien Cook	176	4.8	N/A
Turnout		3,702	46.1	−5.2
Liberal Democrats gain from Labour				
Liberal Democrats gain from Labour				
Liberal Democrats gain from Labour				

Elizabeth Singleton was a sitting councillor for South Tottenham ward

=== Noel Park ===
Noel Park (3)
Party	Candidate	Votes	%	±%
Labour	Jean Brown	1,337	60.3	−1.2
Labour	Narendra Makanji*	1,204	54.3	−3.2
Labour	Abul Zaman	1,053	47.5	−13.1
Conservative	Brian Morrell	380	17.1	−5.1
Liberal Democrats	Kathleen Osborne	372	16.8	+5.4
Conservative	Laleeta Ragnuth	331	14.9	−5.3
Conservative	Sylvia Skipper	325	14.7	−4.1
Green	Jean Robertson-Molloy	258	11.6	+1.0
Socialist Labour	Katherine Imison	223	10.1	N/A
Turnout		2,243	29.6	−13.1
Labour hold				
Labour hold				
Labour hold				

=== Park ===
Park (2)
Party	Candidate	Votes	%	±%
Labour	Sheila Peacock*	708	64.4	+8.3
Labour	Ray Dodds*	696	63.3	+5.7
Conservative	Colleen Maclaren	191	17.4	−6.7
Conservative	Gladys Weeks	146	13.3	−0.4
Liberal Democrats	Robert Gorrie	103	9.4	−7.2
Green	David Burns	88	8.0	N/A
Turnout		1,107	21.5	−17.5
Labour hold				
Labour hold				

=== Seven Sisters ===
Seven Sisters (2)
Party	Candidate	Votes	%	±%
Labour	Frederick Knight*	946	74.9	−1.2
Labour	Dhirendra Basu*	880	69.7	−2.1
Liberal Democrats	Richard Howman	169	13.4	+3.0
Conservative	Judith Flynn	121	9.6	−2.4
Conservative	Ronald Brick	119	9.4	−0.7
Turnout		1,274	26.1	−9.2
Labour hold				
Labour hold				

=== South Hornsey ===
South Hornsey (2)
Party	Candidate	Votes	%	±%
Labour	Sally Billot*	913	56.2	−15.9
Labour	Jane Atkinson	810	49.9	−15.3
Green	Jayne Forbes	244	15.0	−0.8
Liberal Democrats	Julian Satterthwaite	224	13.8	+1.3
Independent	Simon Binks	181	11.1	N/A
Socialist Labour	Ryan Cockman	163	10.0	N/A
Conservative	Sheila Cheetham	154	9.5	−0.7
Green	Gail Scott-Spicer	131	8.1	N/A
Turnout		1,636	33.0	−13.5
Labour hold				
Labour hold				

=== South Tottenham ===
South Tottenham (2)
Party	Candidate	Votes	%	±%
Labour	Michael Green*	867	68.1	−4.2
Labour	Azize Canver	757	59.5	−12.4
Liberal Democrats	David Fisher	209	16.4	N/A
Conservative	Ann Harvey-Kirkwood	193	15.2	−8.4
Conservative	Roger Kirkwood	149	11.7	−12.7
Turnout		1,290	27.0	−9.8
Labour hold				
Labour hold				

=== Tottenham Central ===
Tottenham Central (3)
Party	Candidate	Votes	%	±%
Labour	Richard Reynolds	1,005	61.7	−1.2
Labour	Scott Reeve*	985	60.5	+2.2
Labour	Robert Harriss*	938	57.4	−8.9
Liberal Democrats	Errington Simmons	356	21.9	+10.9
Conservative	Brenda Stevenson	279	17.1	+3.8
Turnout		1,667	23.4	−14.2
Labour hold				
Labour hold				
Labour hold				

=== West Green ===
West Green (3)
Party	Candidate	Votes	%	±%
Labour	Peter Jones*	1,521	66.6	+6.3
Labour	Rahman Khan*	1,341	58.7	+2.6
Labour	Rafaat Mughal**	1,260	55.2	+0.1
Conservative	David Allen	421	18.4	−5.6
Conservative	Susan Hinchcliffe	419	18.4	−2.9
Conservative	Joseph Smith	414	18.1	−2.1
Liberal Democrats	James Haskings	336	14.7	+4.9
Green	Dennis Bury	282	12.4	+2.1
Turnout		2,302	28.5	−12.3
Labour hold				
Labour hold				
Labour hold				

Rafaat Mughal was a sitting councillor for Woodside ward

=== White Hart Lane ===
White Hart Lane (3)
Party	Candidate	Votes	%	±%
Labour	Jean Brown*	942	60.9	+8.4
Labour	Hugh Jones	864	55.9	+8.1
Labour	Charles Adje	744	48.1	+5.5
Conservative	Philip Murphie	352	22.8	−11.8
Conservative	Eric Lattimore	349	22.6	−9.2
Conservative	Jace Maclaren	347	22.4	−7.1
Liberal Democrats	Neil Williams	202	13.1	+6.2
Turnout		1,557	24.3	−17.0
Labour hold				
Labour hold				
Labour hold				

=== Woodside ===
Woodside (3)
Party	Candidate	Votes	%	±%
Labour	Denis Dillon	1,414	63.6	+1.3
Labour	George Meehan**	1,405	63.2	+7.3
Labour	Jayanti Patel**	1,323	59.5	+6.7
Conservative	Mavis Spencer	492	22.1	−5.6
Conservative	John Warren	438	19.7	−7.8
Conservative	Nityanand Ragnuth	407	18.3	−10.2
Liberal Democrats	Valerie Silbiger	324	14.6	N/A
Turnout		2,243	32.4	−9.3
Labour hold				
Labour hold				
Labour hold				

George Meehan was a sitting councillor for Coleraine ward

Jayanti Patel was a sitting councillor for White Hart Lane ward

== By-elections ==
South Tottenham by-election, 10 June 1999
Party	Candidate	Votes	%	±%
Labour	Iris Josiah	671	53.5	−14.6
Liberal Democrats	Neil Williams	292	23.3	+6.9
Conservative	Eric F. Lattimore	177	14.1	−1.1
Green	Peter Budge	112	8.9	N/A
Majority		379	30.2	
Turnout		1,252	26.0	
Labour hold		Swing		

The by-election was called following the resignation of Cllr Michael Green.

Muswell Hill by-election, 10 February 2000
Party	Candidate	Votes	%	±%
Liberal Democrats	Ross Laird	1,415	61.2	+8.6
Labour	Craig Turton	487	21.1	−6.6
Conservative	Brian A. Connell	288	12.5	−0.9
Green	Peter Budge	123	5.3	−5.2
Majority		928	40.1	
Turnout		2,190	28.0	
Liberal Democrats hold		Swing		

The by-election was called following the resignation of Cllr June Anderson.

White Hart Lane by-election, 14 December 2000
Party	Candidate	Votes	%	±%
Labour	Gideon Bull	395	44.6	−11.3
Conservative	Eric F. Lattimore	256	28.9	+6.3
Liberal Democrats	Neil Williams	156	17.6	+4.5
Socialist Alliance	Gary A. McFarlane	61	6.9	N/A
Green	Peter Budge	17	1.9	N/A
Majority		139	15.7	
Turnout		885	13.7	
Labour hold		Swing		

The by-election was called following the resignation of Cllr Hugh Jones.
