= Andrew Green, Baron Green of Deddington =

British diplomat and peer (born 1941)

The Right Honourable The Lord Green of Deddington KCMG
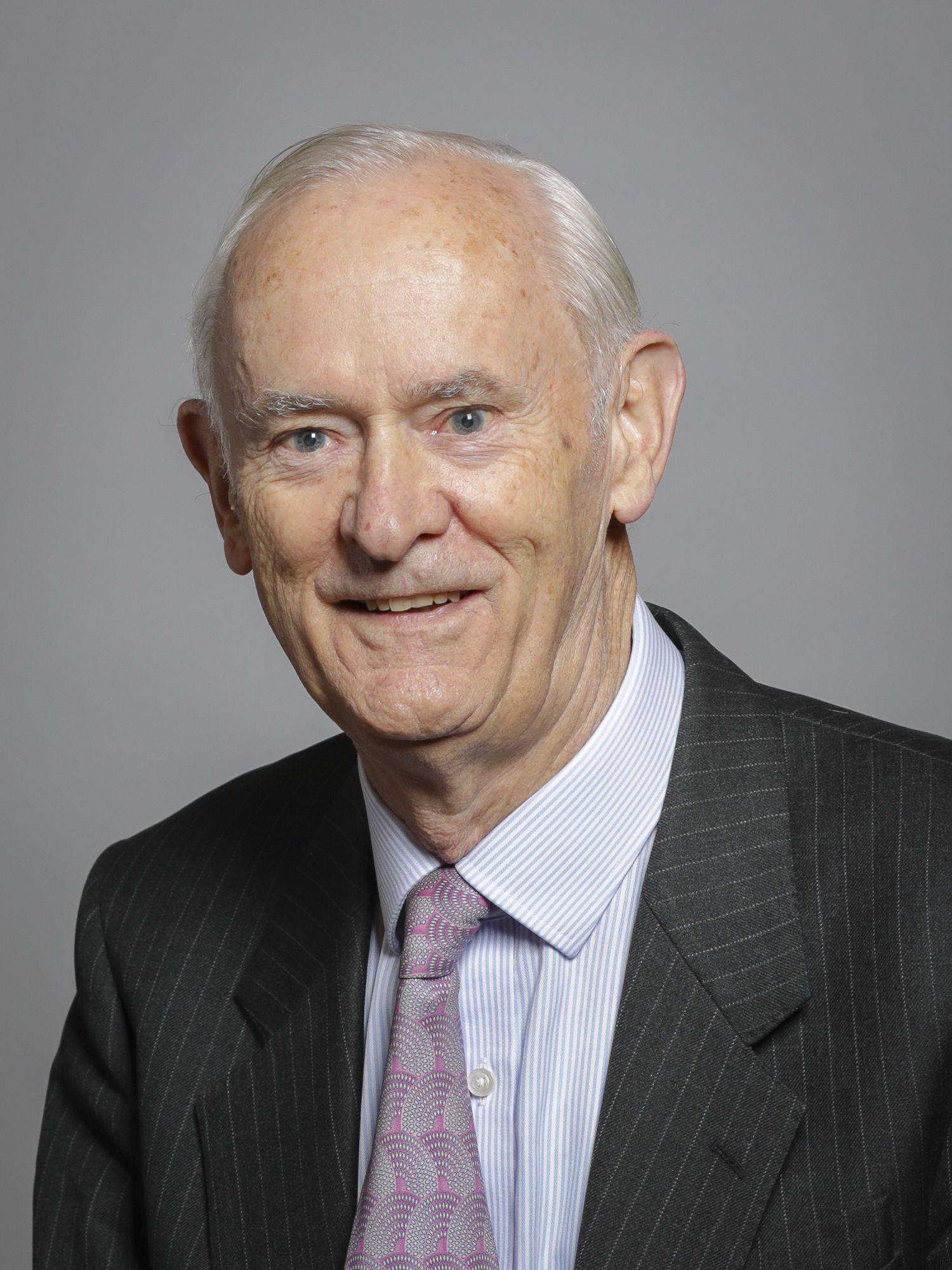
- Official portrait, 2019

Member of the House of Lords
- Lord Temporal
- Life peerage 28 November 2014

Personal details
- Born: Andrew Fleming Green; 6 August 1941 (age 85)
- Party: Crossbencher

Andrew Fleming Green, Baron Green of Deddington, KCMG (born 6 August 1941) is a former British diplomat. He is the founding president of MigrationWatch UK, an organisation arguing for lower immigration to the United Kingdom. He has also held a number of positions with voluntary organisations.

== Background and education ==
Lord Green was educated at Haileybury before going up to Magdalene College, Cambridge, where he read Natural Sciences and Economics. He then took a three-year Short Service Commission in the Royal Green Jackets.

== Career ==
=== Diplomatic career ===
On joining the Diplomatic Service in 1965, he studied Arabic in Lebanon. Thereafter, he spent half his career in the Middle East where he served in six posts. The remainder of his service was divided between London, Paris, and Washington DC. He was HM Ambassador in Syria (1991–94) and then Director for the Middle East at the Foreign Office, before serving for four and a half years as ambassador in Saudi Arabia.

=== MigrationWatch UK ===
After his retirement in June 2000, Lord Green went on to co-found MigrationWatch UK together with David Coleman, Professor of Demography at Oxford University. He was chairman from its establishment in December 2001 until July 2021 when he became president and the chairmanship was taken up by Alp Mehmet.

=== Other work ===
He chaired Medical Aid for Palestinians (a British charity seeking to improve health care for Palestinians both in Palestine and in refugee camps) for three years. He was for 12 years a board member of Christian Solidarity Worldwide (a human rights organisation which speaks for Christians and others around the world who are suffering persecution for their religious beliefs).

He was the co-chair of the lobbying group British Syrian Society, founded by President Assad's father in law Fawaz Akhras, until his resignation in 2011. He was re-appointed as Director of the Society in 2018.

== Awards ==
He was appointed to the Order of St Michael and St George as a Companion (CMG) in the 1991 Birthday Honours and was promoted as a Knight Commander (KCMG) in the 1998 Birthday Honours.

On 21 October 2014 it was announced that Sir Andrew Green was to be created a life peer on David Cameron's personal recommendation for Green's "proven record of public service." He was duly raised to the peerage as Baron Green of Deddington, of Deddington in the County of Oxfordshire on 28 November 2014. Lord Green sits on the cross benches in the House of Lords.

Diplomatic posts
Preceded by Roger Tomkys	British Ambassador to Syria; 1991–1994	Succeeded by Adrian Sindall
Preceded by David Gore-Booth	British Ambassador to Saudi Arabia; 1996–2000	Succeeded by Derek Plumbly
Orders of precedence in the United Kingdom
Preceded by The Lord Callanan	Gentlemen; Baron Green of Deddington	Followed by The Lord Evans of Weardale
