= Catherine West =

British politician (born 1966)

Catherine West MP
- Official portrait, 2024

Parliamentary Under-Secretary of State for Indo-Pacific
- In office 9 July 2024 – 6 September 2025
- Prime Minister: Keir Starmer
- Preceded by: Anne-Marie Trevelyan
- Succeeded by: Seema Malhotra

Member of Parliament for Hornsey and Friern Barnet Hornsey and Wood Green (2015–2024)
- Incumbent
- Assumed office 7 May 2015
- Preceded by: Lynne Featherstone
- Majority: 21,475 (44.2%)

Leader of Islington London Borough Council
- In office 6 May 2010 – 10 October 2013
- Preceded by: Terry Stacy
- Succeeded by: Richard Watts

Member of Islington London Borough Council for Tollington
- In office 2 May 2002 – 22 May 2014

Personal details
- Born: Catherine Elizabeth West; 14 September 1966 (age 60) Mansfield, Victoria, Australia
- Citizenship: Australia; United Kingdom
- Party: Labour
- Spouse: Colin Sutherland
- Children: 2
- Relatives: Michael West (brother); Italia Conti (great-great-aunt)
- Education: University of Sydney (BA, BSW); SOAS, University of London (MA)
- Website: Official website

Catherine Elizabeth West (born 14 September 1966) is an Australian and British politician serving as the Member of Parliament (MP) for Hornsey and Friern Barnet, formerly Hornsey and Wood Green, since 2015. A member of the Labour Party, she served as Parliamentary Under-Secretary of State for Indo-Pacific from 2024 to 2025.

In May 2026, following Labour's losses in the 2026 local elections, West triggered the 2026 Labour Party leadership crisis and called for a cabinet minister to challenge Keir Starmer's leadership, stating that she would stand herself if no senior figure did so; she later withdrew her application to challenge Starmer.

== Early life and career ==
Catherine Elizabeth West was born on 14 September 1966 in Mansfield, Victoria, Australia. She was one of four children to Janet (née Conti) and Roderick West. Her eldest brother is Michael West, an Australian investigative journalist and founder of Michael West Media. Her parents were both teachers, and her father was Headmaster of Trinity Grammar School in Sydney for 21 years.

She grew up in Sydney and was privately educated at Meriden School and Ravenswood School for Girls. West studied modern languages and social work at the University of Sydney, where she was awarded BA and Bachelor of Social Work degrees. While studying there, she met her future husband Colin Sutherland. They lived together in Darwin, Northern Territory, where she worked as a social worker in a refuge for survivors of childhood sexual abuse.

She moved to the United Kingdom in 1998 when her husband gained a job at the London School of Hygiene & Tropical Medicine. She then graduated MA in Chinese Studies at the School of Oriental and African Studies, University of London.

West joined the Labour Party in 1998 and became a caseworker for Tottenham MP David Lammy two years later.

From 2 May 2002 to 22 May 2014, West was a member of Islington London Borough Council representing the Tollington Ward. She was the leader of the council's Labour Party group from 2004 to 10 October 2013 and Council Leader from 6 May 2010 to 10 October 2013. She resigned as a councillor to contest the 2015 general election.

== Parliamentary career ==
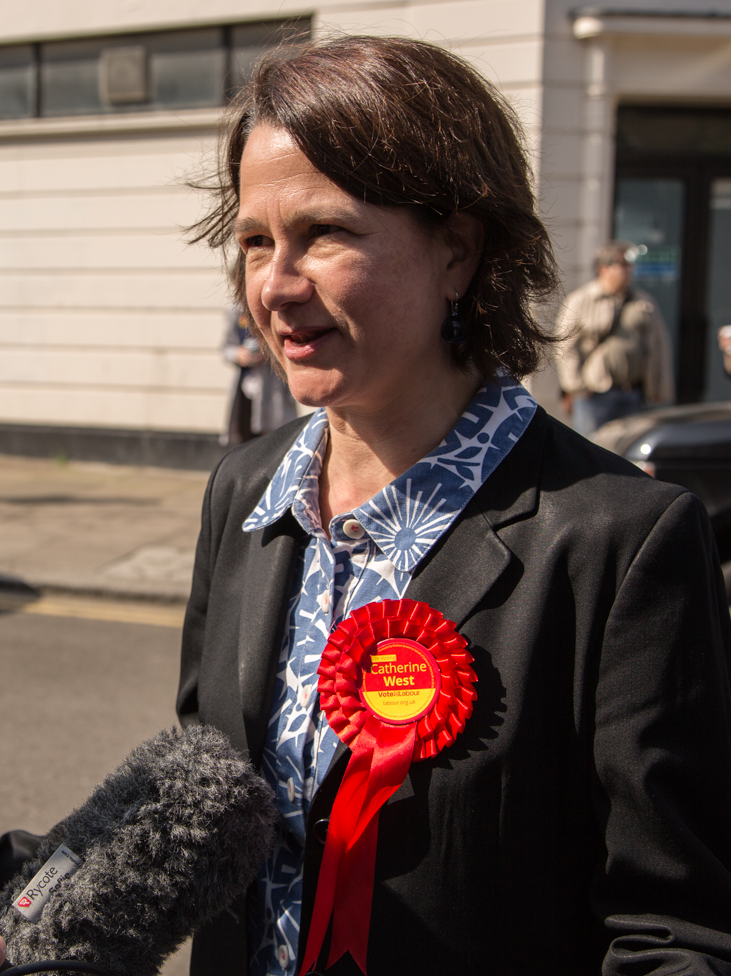
Catherine West being interviewed in 2015

West was elected to Parliament as MP for Hornsey and Wood Green at the 2015 general election with 50.9% of the vote and a majority of 11,058. Following the election of Jeremy Corbyn as leader of the Labour Party, whose campaign she supported, West was promoted to the Official Opposition frontbench as a shadow Foreign Office minister.

During the 2016 Brexit referendum, West was involved with Britain Stronger in Europe, campaigning for the UK to remain within the European Union, arguing that "Britain would be stronger, more prosperous, more secure and more peaceful" if it were to remain within the EU. West's constituency of Hornsey and Wood Green secured the highest remain vote of any constituency, with 81.5% voting to remain. Following the EU referendum, West confirmed she would vote against invoking Article 50 should a vote come before parliament.

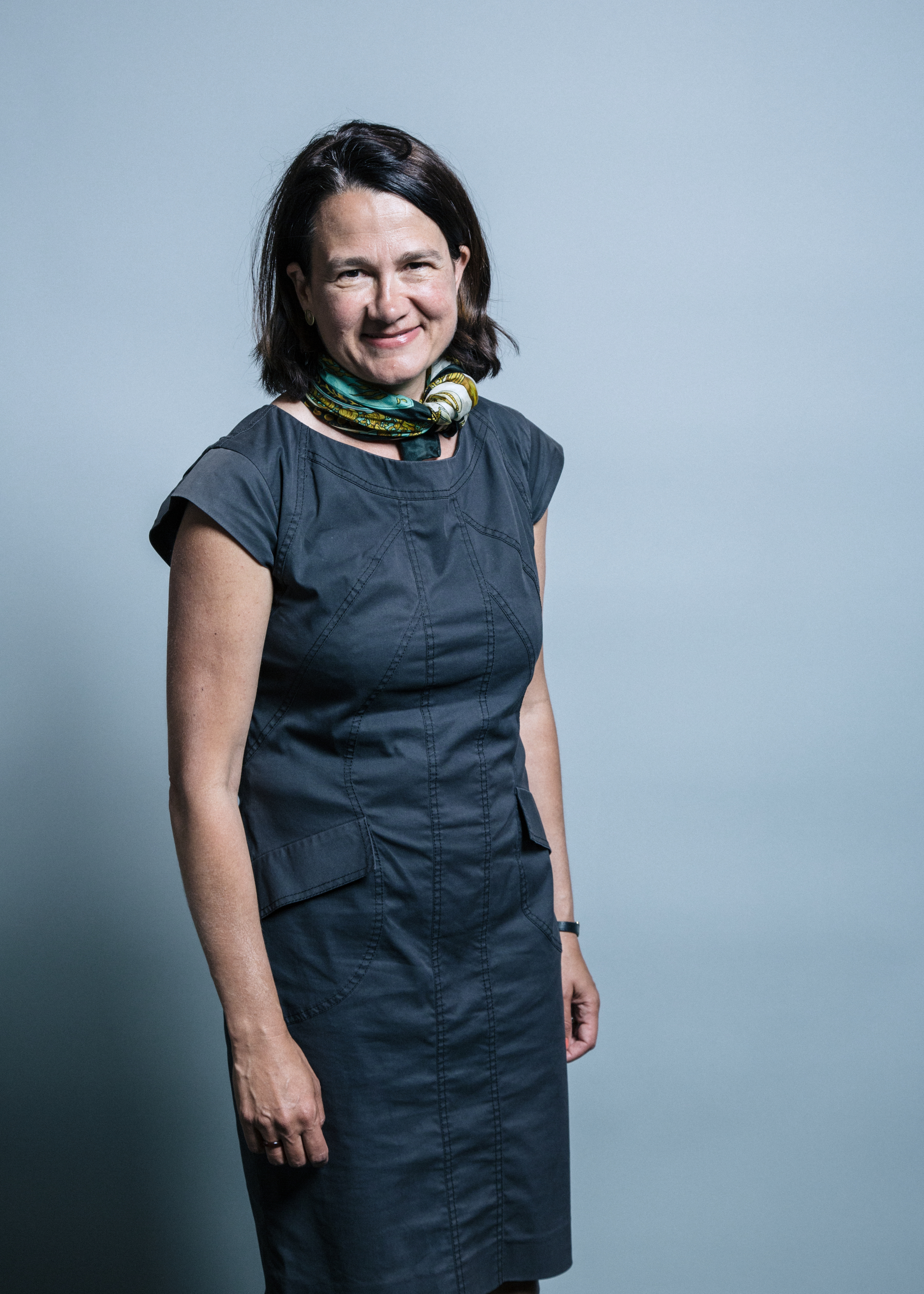
Official portrait, 2017

In January 2017, West voted against triggering Article 50 of the Lisbon Treaty, the process to withdraw from the European Union, along with 46 other Labour Party MPs. At the snap 2017 general election, West was re-elected as MP for Hornsey and Wood Green with an increased vote share of 65.4% and an increased majority of 30,738.

West was dismissed from the Labour frontbench in June 2017 after she voted in favour of an amendment to the Queen's Speech which called on the UK to remain in the European single market, in defiance of the Labour whip.

At the 2019 general election, West was again re-elected, with a decreased vote share of 57.5% and a decreased majority of 19,242.

West returned to the Labour frontbench in 2020 as shadow Sport minister, prior to her promotion to the shadow Foreign Office team under new Labour leader Sir Keir Starmer. Due to the 2023 review of Westminster constituencies, West's constituency of Hornsey and Wood Green was abolished, and replaced with Hornsey and Friern Barnet. At the 2024 general election, West was elected to Parliament as MP for Hornsey and Friern Barnet with 58.7% of the vote and a majority of 21,475.

On 11 July 2024, she was appointed as Parliamentary Under-Secretary at the Foreign, Commonwealth & Development Office. Executive Councillor of Hong Kong Ronny Tong criticised her patronage of Hong Kong Watch, a human rights non-governmental organisation based in the United Kingdom. The mainland Chinese and Hong Kong governments have repeatedly described Hong Kong Watch as an anti-Chinese organisation. The organisation allegedly received a letter from the National Security Department of Hong Kong Police Force indicating it was suspected of violating the 2020 Hong Kong national security law.

=== 2026 challenge to Labour leadership ===
On 9 May 2026, following Labour's losses in the 2026 local elections, West gave an interview in which she called on a cabinet minister to challenge Keir Starmer's leadership. If this failed to happen, she would challenge him herself. This challenge was compared to Sir Anthony Meyer's challenge to Margaret Thatcher in 1989; however, it was noted by The Independent political editor David Maddox that Labour's process is more arduous, requiring 20% of all incumbent Labour MPs to nominate a candidate to run.

Even though this process is difficult to achieve, Maddox said that West's efforts give "permission for the big beasts to come in", which could possibly include names such as Greater Manchester mayor Andy Burnham, former health secretary Wes Streeting and former deputy prime minister Angela Rayner. Speaking in North London to the Press Association that night, West argued that:

What I'd really like to see is not a leadership election, but for them to come together and appoint somebody amongst them who can lead us and give us a vision of how we're going to defeat Nigel Farage and the right wing in the coming general election, which could be as soon as possible... This is what we would describe as an electoral emergency and sadly, the Cabinet have not come out strongly to lead us, to tell us what’s coming next.

The Guardian reported that some allies of Burnham tried to encourage West to withdraw her challenge, because it would not give him enough time to enter parliament before a leadership contest. On 11 May, after a speech from Starmer, West withdrew her threat to challenge Starmer and stand as a candidate, instead saying she wanted Starmer to set out a timetable for an election of a new leader in September, effectively giving Burnham time to return to parliament. As of 11 May 2026, over 70 MPs have publicly called for Starmer to set out a timetable for his departure. In a move that The Guardian described as "bizarre", West said on 14 May that if a leadership contest did happen, she might support Starmer anyway. After weeks of pressure, Starmer announced his intention to resign on 22 June, with the Labour Party leadership contest culminating in Andy Burnham's election as leader on 17 July. While not formally putting herself forward for the leadership position, West was nominated by Neil Coyle after nominations had opened; West herself nominated Burnham.

== Personal life ==
West is a Quaker. She is married to Colin Sutherland, Professor of Parasitology, and former co-director of the London School of Hygiene & Tropical Medicine's Malaria Centre. They met while studying at the University of Sydney. They have a daughter and a son.

She is a dual British and Australian national. West is a member of the Fabian Society. She is the sister of investigative journalist Michael West and the great-great-niece of actress Italia Conti.

West speaks five languages, including Mandarin, which she learned while teaching English as a second language in Nanjing, China.

She is a keen swimmer and cyclist.

Parliament of the United Kingdom
Preceded by Lynne Featherstone	Member of Parliament for Hornsey and Wood Green; 2015–2024	Constituency abolished
New constituency	Member of Parliament for Hornsey and Friern Barnet; 2024–present	Incumbent
