= Migration Watch UK =

British think-tank and campaign group

- Formation: 2001
- Type: Advocacy group
- Location: London, United Kingdom
- Key people: Andrew Green, Founder and President Alp Mehmet, Chairman
- Website: https://www.migrationwatchuk.org/

Migration Watch UK (sometimes styled MigrationWatch UK or Migrationwatch UK) is a British think-tank and campaign group which argues for lower immigration into the United Kingdom. Founded in 2001, the group believes that international migration places undue demand on limited resources and that the current level of immigration is not sustainable.

The group has been praised for what is seen as improving the quality of debate around immigration while others have suggested that the group is anti-immigration and have criticised what they say are faults in the group's studies.

Lord Green of Deddington, former ambassador to Saudi Arabia, is the founder and president of the group. Alp Mehmet, former ambassador to Iceland, is its current chairman. David Coleman, Professor of Demography at Oxford University, is an honorary consultant.

== History ==
Migration Watch UK was founded in December 2001 by Sir Andrew Green, former ambassador to Saudi Arabia. In an article in The Independent, Deborah Orr writes that the organisation came into being when, "after reading some of his anti-immigration letters in The Times", the then Sir Andrew approached David Coleman, Professor of Demography at Oxford University, and they subsequently set up Migration Watch.

The group first came to public attention in 2002 when it stated that immigration, including an estimate of illegal immigrants, was running at two million per decade "and probably more". This claim was challenged at the time by a number of public commentators, with an editorial in The Independent at the time criticising what it called "tendentious projections and the deliberate citing of the vast populations of countries such as India to frighten people and wreck any rational debate". Two years later, Philip Johnston in the Daily Telegraph would argue that Government Actuary's Department forecasts that the UK population would increase by six million people due to immigration over three decades "appear to confirm claims made by Migrationwatch two years ago, when the group first sprang to prominence". A later Telegraph editorial following the 2011 Census would call the group's initial claims "overly cautious".

The group quickly attracted the attention of Home Secretary David Blunkett, who in 2002 set up a unit intended to monitor and rebut the organisation and sought to control the timing of statistical releases to avoid pressure from it.

The organisation has an advisory council, which is chaired by Baron Green and whose members include David Coleman, Caroline Cox and Alp Mehmet, former ambassador to Iceland.

== Outputs ==
Migration Watch's website contains a range of briefing papers to support the organisation's perspective on the statistical, legal, economic and historical aspects of migration, and on topics such as the European Union, housing, health and social cohesion, as they relate to immigration. It has also helped to contribute to briefings on immigration for third parties such as the BBC.

Migration Watch has been frequently cited and seen its spokespeople featured in British newspapers such as the Daily Mail, Daily Telegraph, The Times, The Sunday Times, The Guardian, Daily Express and Daily Star. as well as British broadcast media such as BBC News and ITV News.

In October 2011, the group started a petition on the UK Parliament petitions website calling on the government to take "all necessary steps" to stop the UK's population exceeding 70 million. The petition reached over 100,000 signatures.

== Funding ==
Migration Watch has received the lowest rating of E in the Who Funds You? ranking of think tanks according to funding transparency.

== Policy stances ==
=== Immigration flows ===
Migration Watch argues that the growth of the population of the United Kingdom through international migration is a key "factor driving problems around pressure on school places, the NHS, housing and the transport infrastructure". The group in 2018 argued that migration was linked to 82% of population growth between 2001 and 2016, when combining both net migration and children born to immigrant parents. In the same year it predicted that the population of the United Kingdom would exceed 70 million by 2026.

A 2019 report by Migration Watch condemned the Conservative government's approach to immigration, stating that its policies could increase immigrant numbers by 100,000. It has called Britain's port security "resourced to fail" in stopping illegal immigration, and has opposed the idea of an amnesty for illegal immigrants in Britain, after it was postulated by Prime Minister Boris Johnson. The group criticised the same government for extending the period in which overseas students can stay in the UK from four months to two years, arguing that it would "likely lead to foreign graduates staying on to stack shelves". It was also critical of proposals by Boris Johnson to scrap the £30,000 salary cap on migrants, warning that abolishing the cap could lead to further rises in migration.

The group has expressed opposition to sham marriages, and in August 2019 called for nationality profiling in an attempt to crack down on the practice.

=== Asylum seekers ===
Migration Watch supports the principle of political asylum, but argues that many asylum seekers do not have a genuine case for qualifying for refugee status and are instead using the asylum system to gain entry to the UK for economic reasons. The group has also been strongly critical of what it sees as the government's failure to remove many of those whose claims are rejected. In a briefing paper published in January 2009, the group's Honorary Legal Adviser Harry Mitchell, QC stated that while the group supported "asylum for genuine claimants", the "overwhelming majority of asylum seekers" were in fact economic migrants and did not have a "well-founded fear of persecution".

In July 2010, Migration Watch highlighted what it saw as the potential consequences of the Supreme Court of the United Kingdom's unanimous ruling in favour of two homosexual asylum seekers from Iran and Cameroon, allowing them to stay in the UK. The group argued that the decision would "increase by many thousands the numbers of persons who may be eligible for asylum", as well as "generate a large number of claims that will be difficult to determine", such as instances where people smugglers "tell their clients who come from countries where homosexual acts are illegal to claim that they are homosexual". It argued that assessing such claims "can often take many months during which applicants are supported by public funds".

In August 2016, in response to Home Office data showing that over a third of asylum applications were made by migrants who entered the UK illegally or overstayed their visas, Migration Watch suggested that the data showed that "many of those claiming asylum were in fact economic migrants".

The group has defended the use of the term "illegal immigrant" to describe those who enter a country for the purpose of claiming asylum, against those who associate the term with criminality. The group argues that the term is appropriate, as those who come into a country without permission and outside the law are doing so illegally.

=== Economic impact of immigration ===
Migration Watch has argued that, while limited skilled migration (in both directions) is a natural and beneficial feature of an open economy, very large scale immigration is of little benefit to the indigenous population. Migration Watch has said that migration into the UK has and will tend to hold down the real wages of British citizens. In 2006 it expressed concern that immigration from Eastern Europe was depressing wages.

In December 2008, a Migration Watch report stated that while some immigration results in an increase in the number of people in employment, "it seems an inescapable conclusion that the sudden arrival of a very large number of very capable workers willing to work for low pay has had a negative impact on the employment of British-born workers at the bottom of the pay scale". Will Somerville and Madeleine Sumption of the Washington, D.C.-based Migration Policy Institute state in an Equality and Human Rights Commission report that: "Few serious international or UK economists would agree with this conclusion". Their report did, however, note that "the recent migration may have reduced wages slightly at the bottom end of the labour market, especially for certain groups of vulnerable workers".

Migration Watch has criticised sectors that lobby for a permissive immigration policy, accusing them of offering "low paying jobs with poor conditions and little flexibility for workers".

In 2014, the group published a report on population growth in London, in which it said that immigration trends had put "massive pressure on schools and hospitals and especially housing". It has expressed concerns about the effects of migration rates on the national housing market as a whole, pointing to the discrepancy between migration rates and the number of new houses being built to accommodate a growing population. In 2017 the group said that the impact of immigration on future demand for homes in England had been "seriously understated" by the British government.

In 2016, Migration Watch issued a paper estimating the fiscal impact of immigration for the year 2014/15, which found an overall fiscal cost from immigration with a positive contribution only from migrants of pre-2004 EU states. This was in line with a 2014 study from University College London.

=== Human rights legislation ===
Migration Watch in 2003 advocated that the UK government should "'cut loose from the straitjacket' imposed by its obligations under various conventions that made it impossible to operate the system in the country's best interests". In 2007 it called for the British government to withdraw from the European Convention on Human Rights (ECHR) and write its own Human Rights Act.

=== EU membership ===
The group has been critical of large-scale migration from the European Union, having in 2013 predicted combined migration inflows from Romania and Bulgaria of approximately 50,000 per annum when free movement restrictions would be lifted the following year.

In January 2016, the group published a report claiming that the UK leaving the European Union could result in a reduction of annual net migration from 180,000 to around 65,000, although added that such a number should not be taken as a "precise estimate" but was "intended to illustrate the scale of the potential reduction under the policy outlined". Migration Watch stated that they would not take a position on the UK's EU membership referendum held in June 2016. In 2017 the group backed the idea of visa-free travel between the UK and EU after Brexit, adding that EU citizens who would want to work in the UK should need a work permit.

=== Hong Kong ===
After the British government reacted to the Hong Kong national security law, announcing that British National (Overseas) passport holders in Hong Kong would be given the right to live, study and work in the UK and would be offered a route to route to citizenship, Migration Watch published a paper stating that "a Home Office factsheet confirmed that the number who might eventually be able to come is up to 2.9 million – the current number of BNOs residing in Hong Kong". The paper argued that the government had "cast the proposed offer of a pathway to citizenship as part and parcel with the UK honouring its 'historical responsibilities'", suggesting that this set a dangerous precedent. Chris Whitehouse, responding to the Migration Watch paper in an article for CapX, argued that "the UK's historic duty towards Hong Kong is very different to other former colonies; and the future of Hongkongers is based on China keeping its word, which it is brazenly failing to do". He concluded that "Lord Andrew Green and Migration Watch are out of step with the nation on this one, and they should urgently consult Lord Patten on their route ahead if they are not to lose their way".

== Reaction to the group ==
=== Praise ===
Conservative politician Jonathan Aitken has credited Migration Watch with improving the quality of the British debate on immigration. He argues that "Migrationwatch has changed the administrative practices of the civil service and the policies of the major political parties on asylum seekers, work permit criteria and numerical totals. It has introduced integrity and accuracy into the previously misleading government statistics on immigration. The level of understanding of the subject in all serious newspapers and broadcasting organizations has been improved. Britain may or may not have the right answers to immigration questions, but we certainly now have a far more informed debate on them".

Similarly, an article by Dean Godson of the centre-right think tank Policy Exchange published in The Times in June 2006 states: "The dramatic change in the terms of the immigration debate over recent months is largely down to the determination and courage of a single individual – Sir Andrew Green, the founder and chairman of MigrationWatch UK. Almost single-handedly, he has rescued the national discourse from the twin inanities of saloon-bar bigotry on the Right and politically correct McCarthyism on the Left".

Jay Rayner, writing in The Observer quotes one senior BBC News executive, who stated: "We probably were reluctant and slow to take him seriously to begin with. We probably didn't like what he had to say. But then we were also slow to pick up on immigration as a story, not least because we are a very middle-class organisation and the impact of mass immigration was being felt more in working-class communities. If he's proved himself, it's because he hasn't put a foot wrong on the information he's published".

Peter Oborne, writing as chief political commentator of the Daily Telegraph, has also praised Migration Watch and the efforts of Lord Green. In 2014 Oborne called Green "one of the most morally courageous people in British public life", and has said that the "liberal media establishment" owe Green "a huge apology" for mocking his predictions about future immigration numbers.

=== Criticism ===
While the group describes itself as independent and non-political, it has been characterised as a right-wing lobby or pressure group by some commentators and academics.

It has been argued that Migration Watch's messages "can be taken advantage of by people with Islamophobia and prejudice". The accuracy of the group's research has also been questioned. David Robinson, Professor of Housing and Public Policy at Sheffield Hallam University, argues that the group's assertion that immigrants are placing strain on social housing lacks evidence. Economist Philippe Legrain has claimed that "MigrationWatch's xenophobic prejudice is causing it to twist the truth" about the impact of immigration on the employment prospects of British people.

In February 2013, Migration Matters, an organisation chaired by former Labour MP Barbara Roche and co-chaired by then-Conservative MP Gavin Barwell, criticised the BBC for treating Migration Watch's analysis as politically neutral.

In 2014, Jonathan Portes of the National Institute of Economic and Social Research complained to the Press Complaints Commission that articles in the Daily Mail and Daily Telegraph about the net amount of tax paid by Eastern European migrants, which were based on Migration Watch statistics, were inaccurate. The two newspapers amended the articles in response.

Some other commentators have criticised what they see as the media uncritically reproducing the findings of Migration Watch in their own reporting. Academics Nissa Finney and Ludi Simpson in 2009 stated that while they believed the evidence used by Migration Watch to be questionable, it received prominence in migration debates and had assumed an authority which they considered to be "dangerous if there is no similar authority presenting counterarguments". Bernhard Gross, Kerry Moore and Terry Threadgold of the Cardiff School of Journalism, Media and Cultural Studies at Cardiff University have criticised the broadcast media's use of Migration Watch to 'balance' reports on immigration, arguing that the "whole idea of 'balance' in these contexts needs to be re-thought" and that "there are never just two sides to any story".

=== Defamation ===
In 2007, the Daily Mirror paid damages to Andrew Green after columnist Brian Reade likened him and the group to the Ku Klux Klan and Nazi Party, which the paper admitted was "untrue".

In August 2010, Sally Bercow, a Labour Party Prospective Parliamentary Candidate and wife of Conservative MP John Bercow, argued on a Sky News newspaper review that a Daily Express article based on Migration Watch research was "oversimplifying" and constituted "dangerous propaganda". As a result, Migration Watch and Andrew Green threatened to take libel action against Bercow. After she instructed the lawyer David Allen Green to defend the threatened action, Migration Watch dropped its threat. According to a Migration Watch press release, in the light of an assurance by her lawyer that Mrs Bercow "did not intend to (and did not) allege that Migrationwatch is a fascist or racist organisation", the organisation decided not to take the matter further.

== See also ==
- Foreign-born population of the United Kingdom
- Immigration to the United Kingdom since 1922
- Information Centre about Asylum and Refugees
