= David Allen Green =

British lawyer and writer

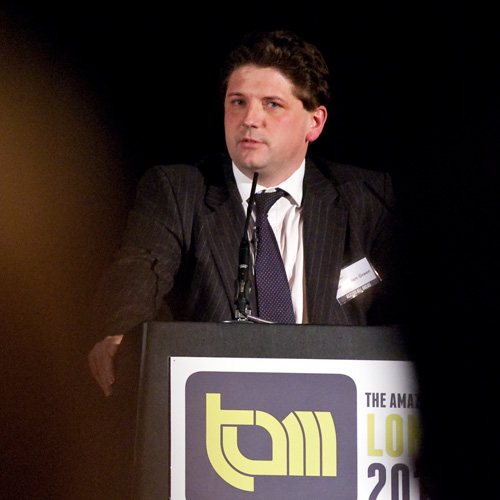
- David Allen Green in 2010
- Born: David Allen Green; 28 March 1971 (age 55); Birmingham, England
- Other name: Jack of Kent
- Education: Four Dwellings School; Halesowen College; University of Oxford (BA); University of Birmingham
- Occupations: Lawyer; Journalist
- Awards: Orwell Prize (2009)
- Website: davidallengreen.com

David Allen Green (born 28 March 1971; 'Allen' is his second forename) is an English lawyer and writer. He is the former legal correspondent for the New Statesman; writes about law and policy for the Financial Times; and has previously blogged using the pseudonym Jack of Kent.

Green's articles on legal matters have been published by The Guardian, The Lawyer, New Scientist, Financial Times Prospect. and others.

Green was shortlisted for the Orwell prize for blogging in 2010 and was a judge of the same in 2011. He was also named in 2010 as one of the leading innovators in journalism and media, and in 2011 as one of the 'Hot 100' lawyers by The Lawyer.

== Education and early life ==
Green was born at Selly Oak Hospital and brought up in Birmingham. After attending Four Dwellings comprehensive school and Halesowen College sixth-form, he studied modern history at the University of Oxford as an undergraduate student of Pembroke College, Oxford. He subsequently studied law at the University of Birmingham.

== Career ==
In 2012, Green was listed on the Independent on Sunday newspaper Pink List, a list of influential British LGBT people. On Twitter, Green said that he was bisexual in response to the listings. He has also said that he was "not Christened, and am still less a Christian".

=== Legal career ===
After being awarded the Sir Thomas More and Hardwicke Scholarships by Lincoln's Inn, Green was called to the Bar in 1999 and became a solicitor in 2001. Formerly a lawyer at Baker McKenzie, Herbert Smith, and the Treasury Solicitor, he is now (and since 2009) head of the media practice at Preiskel & Co.

He was involved on a pro bono basis with Simon Singh's successful libel defence campaign against the British Chiropractic Association.

In 2010, he advised Sally Bercow over possible libel action by think tank MigrationWatch UK and their chairman Sir Andrew Green which was later dropped.

He led the defence in the Twitter joke trial, in which defendant Paul Chambers was acquitted on appeal on 27 July 2012.

=== Journalism ===
Green is a blogger on his own blog, and previously one under the name Jack of Kent (named after Jack o' Kent), is a columnist on law and policy for the Financial Times; and has contributed to the New Statesman, The Guardian, The Lawyer, and the New Scientist in the past. He has been a guest on the Remainiacs podcast several times in 2019, and has used his expertise to explain aspects of United Kingdom constitutional law as they relate to Brexit and the 2019 British prorogation controversy.

In 2012, he gave evidence to the Leveson Inquiry into the culture, practices and ethics of the British press.
