= Equal Ever After =

Equal Ever After: The Fight for Same-Sex Marriage - And How I Made it Happen
- Cover art for Equal Ever After.
- Author: Lynne Featherstone
- Language: English
- Subject: Same-sex marriage in the United Kingdom
- Published: London
- Publisher: Biteback Publishing
- Publication date: 2016
- Publication place: United Kingdom
- Pages: 326
- ISBN: 978-1-84954-974-5 (Hardcover)
- Dewey Decimal: 306.8480941

Equal Ever After: The Fight for Same-Sex Marriage - And How I Made it Happen is a 2016 book by British politician Lynne Featherstone, published by Biteback Publishing.

== Background and synopsis ==
Featherstone, the Member of Parliament for Hornsey and Wood Green (2005–15) served as Parliamentary Under-Secretary for Equalities in the Conservative-Liberal Democrat coalition. In this role she worked to ensure the legalisation of Same-sex marriage in the United Kingdom. Equal Ever After seeks to present a behind-the-scenes account of the details surrounding the fight for equal marriage rights and to "get my story and the story of the Liberal Democrats on the record."

== Reception ==
In a profile piece in the London Evening Standard, Katie Law described Equal Ever After as a "a minute-by-minute, tub-thumping, 326-page account."
