= Peter Ford (diplomat) =

English diplomat

Deputy Leader of the Workers Party of Britain
- Incumbent
- Assumed office 13 December 2023
- Leader: George Galloway
- Preceded by: Joti Brar

British Ambassador to Syria
- In office 2003–2006

British Ambassador to Bahrain
- In office 1999–2003

Personal details
- Born: Peter William Ford; 27 June 1947 (age 79) Runcorn, Cheshire, England
- Party: Workers Party of Britain
- Education: The Queen's College, Oxford
- Profession: Diplomat (retired)

Peter William Ford (born 27 June 1947) is a British former diplomat who served as the British Ambassador to Bahrain from 1999 to 2003 and to Syria from 2003 to 2006. In 2023, Ford became a Deputy Leader of the Workers Party of Britain.

== Education and career ==
While being raised in Runcorn, Ford was educated at Weston Point Community Primary School, Helsby Grammar School in Cheshire and The Queen's College, Oxford.

Having finished his Arabic studies he worked for the Diplomatic Service in Beirut, Riyadh, Paris and Cairo before being appointed British Ambassador to Bahrain from 1999 to 2003 and British Ambassador to Syria from 2003 to 2006.

Retiring from the Diplomatic Service in 2006, he became Representative of the Commissioner-General of UNRWA in the Arab world.

== Politics ==
In December 2023, Ford was elected as one of the Deputy Leaders of the Workers Party of Britain. He was the Workers Party of Britain candidate in the 2025 Runcorn and Helsby by-election.

== Positions ==
In 2003, as ambassador to Bahrain, Ford says he sent critical memoranda to London before the Iraq War. Later, he regretted not opposing the Iraq war more forcefully. During his time in Damascus (2003–2006), he says he distanced himself more and more from the official policies.

In 2016, he suggested opposition forces were responsible for an attack on a UN humanitarian convoy in September 2016 which led to the deaths of 10 humanitarians. A UN panel of inquiry said the attack was conducted from the air, and only Syrian and Russian air forces were operating in the area. The UN panel stated "that it did not have evidence to conclude that the incident was a deliberate attack on a humanitarian target".

He accused the British government of lies and political mistakes in Syria from the start of the uprising, thus aggravating the situation. He argued that Prime Minister David Cameron should have either committed British forces or refrained from encouraging opposition forces from mounting a campaign against the Syrian government. Ford believes that the British leaders expected an early end of the Syrian government and overestimated the strength of the moderate opposition.

Ford argued that the fall of Syrian dictator Bashar al-Assad would open a "Pandora's box", repeating the mistakes of Libya and Iraq. In his opinion, the fall of the Syrian government would lead to the massacres of Christians, Shias, Alawites, Druze and other minorities.

On the Khan Shaykhun chemical attack, he commented to the BBC that "there [had] been no investigation.. not a dodgy dossier - we've not seen any dossier whatever this time". Ford argued there was no proof of the Syrian government's involvement in the attack. He said that he did not believe the Syrian government was responsible for the attack because "[i]t defies belief that [Assad] would bring all this on his head. For no military advantage. The site that was hit had no military significance. It made absolutely no sense. It would have angered the Russians for no other reason: it was simply not plausible". Also in 2017, Ford became a director for the British Syrian Society, a lobby group founded and ran by Fawaz Akhras, Assad's father-in-law.

Ford participated in the EuroCSE conference on the future of Syria from 5 to 6 April 2017. At the conference Ford described the British policy as "incoherent and grotesque", and accused the British government of being among those in the front rank of destroying Syria. He added that following the Iraq War he had been under regular instructions to remonstrate with the Syrians over the flow of jihadis into Iraq, but said he understood the Syrian government's point of view.

According to Searchlight magazine, Ford has occasionally been a guest speaker at the "Keep Talking" conspiracy theory group founded by Ian Fantom and Nick Kollerstrom, which has been criticized for its antisemitic rhetoric and Holocaust denial.
