= Workers Party of Britain =

Political party in the United Kingdom

- Leader: George Galloway
- Deputy Leaders: Andy Hudd; Peter Ford
- Founder: George Galloway
- Founded: December 2019; 6 years ago
- Headquarters: 91 Church Road; Birmingham; B13 9EA
- Membership (January 2025): 7,469
- Ideology: Socialism; Social conservatism; Left-wing populism
- Political position: Left-wing to far-left
- International affiliation: Sovintern
- Colours: Maroon
- Councillors: 7 / 18,645

Website
- workerspartygb.org

The Workers Party of Britain (WPB), also called the Workers Party of Great Britain (WPGB) or Workers Party GB, is a socialist, left-conservative political party in the United Kingdom, strongly identified with its leader, former Labour and Respect MP George Galloway. The party was founded in 2019 and says it campaigns "for the workers, not the wokers". It gained a parliamentary seat when Galloway won the 2024 Rochdale by-election, but lost it to Labour five months later at the 2024 general election. As of 2026, party leader Galloway is living in "self-imposed exile" in Russia.

== History ==
=== Foundation and early activities ===
The Workers Party of Britain was founded in response to the Labour Party's landslide defeat at the 2019 general election and the resignation of Jeremy Corbyn as Leader of the Labour Party. The founding of the Workers Party of Britain was welcomed by the Communist Party of Great Britain (Marxist–Leninist) (CPGB-ML). Joti Brar, a vice-chair of the CPGB-ML, was elected as the Workers Party of Britain's deputy leader at its founding congress. In March 2021, the party stood its first candidate for elected office, Paul Burrows, in the by-election for Helensburgh and Lomond South ward on Argyll and Bute Council. Burrows came last out of six, gaining 22 votes (0.9%). In the 2021 local elections, the party stood more than 40 candidates for local elections in England.

==== Batley and Spen by-election ====
The WPB contested its first parliamentary seat at the 2021 Batley and Spen by-election, with Galloway as its candidate. Galloway gained 8,264 votes (21.9%) and came in third, behind the winning Labour candidate Kim Leadbeater and second placed Conservative candidate Ryan Stephenson. The Liberal Democrats came in fourth place, as they did in the previous election. Galloway concentrated on the issues of the Palestinian territories, the Kashmir conflict, criticism of Labour leader Keir Starmer, the suspension of a teacher for showing a cartoon of Muhammad at Batley Grammar School, and the reopening of a police station in Batley. The campaign received considerable media attention due to incidents of harassment during its final days. The Jewish Labour Movement called the result a "triumph for hope and decency" over Galloway's "toxic politics". Galloway vowed to challenge the result on the basis of an alleged "false statement" made about him by Leadbeater and Starmer, which he said tipped the result of the by-election.

The party contested the Almond ward of Edinburgh Council in the 2022 Scottish local elections, and came second to last with 61 first-preference votes (0.4%). In the 2022 local elections, Workers Party candidate Ed Woollard achieved 15% of the vote in the Bordesley and Highgate ward of Birmingham. In 2023, the former Labour MP Chris Williamson joined the party. The Workers Party has defended Williamson, who was suspended from the Labour Party for his comments about antisemitism allegations in the Labour Party, and Ken Livingstone, who left the party following allegations of antisemitism. At the party's Congress in December 2023, Galloway was re-elected party leader. Three deputy leaders were elected: Chris Williamson, Andy Hudd (Vice President of the Associated Society of Locomotive Engineers and Firemen), and Peter Ford (former Ambassador to Bahrain and Syria).

=== 2024 Rochdale by-election and local elections ===
==== Rochdale by-election ====
On 29 February 2024, Galloway won the 2024 Rochdale by-election following the disendorsement of the Labour candidate in a traditionally safe Labour seat. The Gaza war dominated the campaign. In his election speech, Galloway said: "Keir Starmer, this is for Gaza. You will pay a high price for the role that you have played in enabling, encouraging and covering for the catastrophe presently going on in occupied Palestine, in the Gaza Strip." Galloway won almost 40% of the vote and overturned a previous Labour majority of 9,668, achieved by former MP Tony Lloyd, whose death had precipitated the by-election. Turnout at 39.7% was much lower than the 60.1% for the 2019 general election. Labour had withdrawn support for its candidate when it became known he had suggested that Israel was complicit in the 2023 Hamas-led attack on Israel. Following the by-election, it was announced that the Workers Party had 59 prospective parliamentary candidates for the 2024 UK general election.

==== 2024 local elections ====
In March 2024, the party gained its first councillor when the former mayor of Hounslow, Amritpal Mann, defected to the Workers Party. At the 2024 local elections, the party stood 33 candidates for councillor positions. Four of them were elected, including two in the Metropolitan Borough of Rochdale (where they received 13% of the overall vote with Labour receiving 42% and the Conservatives 19%) and one in Calderdale. Shahbaz Sarwar, their candidate in Longsight Ward, Manchester, unseated deputy leader of City Council Luthfur Rahman, with 2,444 votes to Labour's 2,259. The WPB endorsed independent candidate for the Mayor of the West Midlands, Akhmed Yakoob, came third with 69,621 votes (11.7%). Yakoob announced his intention to stand in the 2024 general election at Birmingham Ladywood. He is again endorsed by the WPB.

The party's mayoral candidate in Lewisham, John Hamilton, distributed a flyer saying "Starmer's Labour Party is falling apart. Any criticism of Israel is labelled antisemitic. He is their puppet". He posed with a placard that depicted a swastika above a Jewish Star of David next to corresponding historical massacres. He came fifth, with 5.7% of the vote. On 2 July, independent (formerly Labour) Burnley councillor Syeda Kazmi joined the party.

=== 2024 general election ===
On 30 April 2024, Galloway announced that he had 500 candidates ready and that the party would stand in every seat at the 2024 general election. Among the candidates were announced were former cricketer Monty Panesar, along with defectors from UKIP and Labour. Describing the Labour Party as the "number one enemy", Galloway said the party was targeting Labour seats, and that it would support a small number of independent left candidates, including Claudia Webbe in Leicester East and Jeremy Corbyn in Islington North.

Within a week, Panesar stood down following a series of disastrous media interviews. Former Labour MP and WPB deputy leader Chris Williamson stood in Derby South. In April 2024, it was reported that the WPB candidate in Brentford and Isleworth, Nisar Malik, a former mayor of Hounslow, posted a video in which David Duke, a former "grand wizard" of the Ku Klux Klan, expressed antisemitic conspiracy theories about Jews controlling the media and the global financial system. The candidate in Putney, Hassan Chahine, was deselected in late May, due to exposure of his sharing antisemitic material (including a video that asserted that a "coven of Jews" had "seized" control of America and that Jews have been punished throughout history for "killing Jesus Christ") and praising Hezbollah.

The party launched its official campaign on 1 June, with Galloway declaring Labour leader Keir Starmer was "indistinguishable" from Rishi Sunak and had "blood on his hands" over his position on Gaza. Its 34 page manifesto, which was published in June, included policies to increase the personal allowance, consider nationalising some public services including rail, water, electricity and the "military-industrial complex", oppose ULEZ and "green hysteria", regulate "Big Food" and "Big Pharma", end "creeping buro-fascism" and "cultural engineering" and instead support free speech, recognise working class "anxiety" about mass immigration, end "imperialist wars", support Palestine, withdraw from NATO, consider dropping the retirement age to 60, introduce non-means tested free school lunches and remove the UK nuclear deterrent.

Retired rugby league footballer Keith Mason was the party's candidate for Wakefield and Rothwell. He was deselected by the party in June over "anti-Islamic" tweets. His name remained on the ballot because the deadline for candidates to be nominated had passed. Later in June, a number of Workers Party activists and prospective candidates were accused of promoting antisemitic conspiracy theories involving Jewish control. In total, more than a tenth of people running for the party had their content flagged online for accused antisemitism. It was reported that Kamran Khan, the WPB candidate in Poplar and Limehouse, "claimed America is controlled by a 'Jewish mafia' and implied that anyone who learnt about Jewish history would become a Nazi." Khan was also accused of mocking Holocaust Remembrance Day by sharing a post on Twitter that said the date represented a "galactic load of victimhood". At the same time, the candidate in Finchley and Golders Green, Mez Derak, shared an article that called the Jewish festival Passover "a sick and twisted holiday." It was also reported that the Chesterfield candidate, Julie Lowe, had disputed that 6 million Jews had been murdered in the Holocaust. The WPB stood down its candidate in Chingford and Woodford Green to support Faiza Shaheen, a candidate deselected by Labour.

In the end, the WPB stood 152 candidates, with Galloway defending his Rochdale seat. The WPB won no seats but did garner 210,194 votes across the country. George Galloway came in second place to Labour Party candidate and journalist Paul Waugh in Rochdale. Waugh received 13,027 votes, equivalent to 32.8% of the vote, while Galloway received 11,587 votes, equivalent to 29.2% of the vote. Craig Murray, who stood in Blackburn for the party, finished in third place behind independent candidate Adnan Hussain and incumbent Labour MP Kate Hollern. The Workers Party came within a small number of votes of defeating some high profile Labour MPs with large swings. Jody McIntyre came in second place in Birmingham Yardley, 693 votes short of unseating Labour's Jess Phillips. James Giles won just 1,566 fewer votes than Liam Byrne in Birmingham Hodge Hill and Solihull North.

Galloway stood as the Workers Party candidate in the 2026 Holborn and St Pancras by-election, coming seventh.

== Ideology and platform ==
The party identifies as a socialist, working class party, which aims for "a redistribution of wealth and power in favour of working people". It describes itself as "economically radical" and "committed to class politics". It has expressed support for a planned economy. The party advocates "rebuilding British industry", universal "decent housing", more social housing, "free or cheap" public transportation, an end to NHS waiting lists, and improving "poverty pay". It pledges the renationalisation of utility companies, free school meals for all children without means testing, free adult education, and to hold a referendum on the continued existence of the British monarchy and proportional representation for elections. The party also advocates referendums on net zero emissions policies. Its manifesto states: "The transition to a Green economy should be at a pace that matches the ability of our population to afford it. We will not be seduced by the more apocalyptic Green hysteria". It has been referred to as "climate sceptical".

The party has been defined as left-conservative for taking some socially conservative positions, for example rejecting gender self-identification, and party leader George Galloway describes himself as socially conservative. Galloway said the party was "the working-class patriotic alternative to fake woke anti-British 'Labour'". In May 2024, Galloway told Novara Media that same-sex relationships are not "normal".

The party opposes NATO and European Union membership, with a policy of withdrawing Britain from NATO. It founded the anti-NATO group "No2Nato". The party says it is "unequivocal in its support for the Palestinian liberation struggle and opposition to Zionism as a violently racist ideology". The party supports a one-state solution to the Israeli–Palestinian conflict. The party's position on the Russo-Ukrainian war focuses on condemning "the expansionary provocation of NATO" and the Ukrainian government. Its manifesto states that the party would "withdraw all [British] military support from war zones and work for a negotiated and peaceful settlement whenever and wherever war breaks out". During the week of Galloway's by-election win, a WPB delegation was taking part in the World Festival of Youth in Russia, and supports Russia's war against Ukraine as part of "a wider anti-imperialist, anti-colonialist framework".

== Election results ==
=== Senedd elections ===
Year	Votes	%	Seats	Misc.
2021	411	0.04%	0/60	Contested South Wales Central (0.2%)

=== Scottish Parliament elections ===
Year	Constituency	%	Regional	%	Seats	Misc.
2021	N/A	N/A	23,299	0.9%	0/129	As part of All for Unity, contested all regional ballots
2026	1,321	0.1%	3,402	0.2%	0/129	

=== UK parliamentary elections ===
Year	Votes	Candidate	%	Finish
2021 Batley and Spen by-election	8,264	George Galloway	21.9%	3rd
2024 Rochdale by-election	12,335	George Galloway	39.7%	1st
2024 general election in Rochdale	11,508	George Galloway	29.2%	2nd
2024 United Kingdom general election	210,194	152 candidates	0.7%	9th
2025 Runcorn and Helsby by-election	164	Peter Ford	0.5%	9th
2026 Holborn and St Pancras by-election	314	George Galloway	1.1%	7th

=== UK local elections ===
==== Mayoral elections ====
Year	Votes	Candidate	%	Position	Finish
2024	2,378	John Hamilton	5.7%	Mayor of Lewisham	5th
2025	434	Ahsan Jamil	0.6%	Mayor of Doncaster	9th

==== Police and Crime Commissioner elections ====
Year	Votes	Candidate	%	Position	Finish
2024	8,396	Waheed Akbar	8.3%	Bedfordshire Police and Crime Commissioner	4th

== Local government ==
There are currently seven councillors who represent the Workers Party of Britain in local government.

Council	Councillors	
Birmingham	1 / 101	6th
Calderdale	1 / 51	6th
Rochdale	4 / 60	4th
Bury	1 / 51	7th

== Notable members ==
- Amjad Bashir, former Conservative Party and UKIP Member of the European Parliament for Yorkshire and the Humber (2014–2019).
- Peter Ford, former Ambassador to Bahrain (1999–2003) and Syria (2003–2006).
- George Galloway, founder and leader of the WPB, formerly an MP 1987–2005 (for the Labour Party and as an independent politician), then 2005–2010 and 2012–2015 (both for the Respect Party), and for the WPB from the 2024 Rochdale by-election until the 2024 general election.
- Keith Mason, former English rugby league player and actor who was initially selected to stand in the Wakefield and Rothwell constituency at the 2024 general election, but was deselected after accusations of Islamophobia.
- Monty Panesar, former England cricketer who planned to contest the Ealing Southall constituency at the 2024 general election, but soon withdrew as a candidate.
- Brian Travers, former band member of UB40. He died in August 2021.

== See also ==
- Old Left
- Workers' Party (Ireland), unrelated Irish party
