= Hugh Rossi =

British politician (1927–2020)

Sir Hugh Rossi FKC

Minister of State for Social Security
- In office 5 January 1981 – 12 June 1983
- Prime Minister: Margaret Thatcher
- Preceded by: Reg Prentice
- Succeeded by: Rhodes Boyson

Minister of State for Northern Ireland
- In office 7 May 1979 – 5 January 1981
- Prime Minister: Margaret Thatcher
- Preceded by: Don Concannon
- Succeeded by: Adam Butler

Member of Parliament for Hornsey and Wood Green Hornsey (1966–1983)
- In office 31 March 1966 – 9 April 1992
- Preceded by: Muriel Gammans
- Succeeded by: Barbara Roche

Personal details
- Born: Hugh Alexis Louis Rossi; 21 June 1927 London, England
- Died: 14 April 2020 (aged 92) London, England
- Party: Conservative
- Spouse: Philomena Jennings (m. 1955; died 2018)
- Children: 5
- Education: King's College London

Sir Hugh Alexis Louis Rossi, KCSG, KHS, FKC (21 June 1927 – 14 April 2020) was a British Conservative Party politician. He was educated at Finchley Catholic Grammar School and King's College London (LLB).

== Background ==
Rossi was born in London in 1927; his father, Gaudenzio Rossi, came to London in 1919 after serving in the Italian Army in the First World War. He was educated at Finchley Catholic High School and went onto King's College London. He became a solicitor.

== Political career ==
Rossi was elected a councillor on Hornsey Borough Council 1956–65, serving as deputy mayor 1964–65, and on the successor London Borough of Haringey from 1964. He was also a Middlesex County Councillor 1961–65. Rossi was Member of Parliament (MP) for Hornsey from 1966 to 1983, and (after boundary changes) for Hornsey and Wood Green, 1983 to 1992.

A junior minister in the governments of Edward Heath and Margaret Thatcher, he was on the 'One Nation' wing of the party. Michael Heseltine praised his social housing ideas (especially Right to Buy) as fundamental to Conservative general election successes. He was expecting to be made Minister of State for Housing on the back of his work after the Conservatives won the 1979 general election but instead was made a Minister of State for Northern Ireland. The Prime Minister Margaret Thatcher wrongly believed that his disappointment was a worry that he could not carry out this role as a Catholic, and arranged a meeting between Rossi and the Archbishop of Westminster Basil Hume to reassure him that there was no conflict of interest.

He retired in 1992, after which the Conservative Party lost the Hornsey and Wood Green seat, when his successor as Conservative candidate, Andrew Boff, was defeated by the Labour Party's Barbara Roche.

Rossi was knighted in Thatcher's 1983 Dissolution Honours List.

== Personal life and death ==
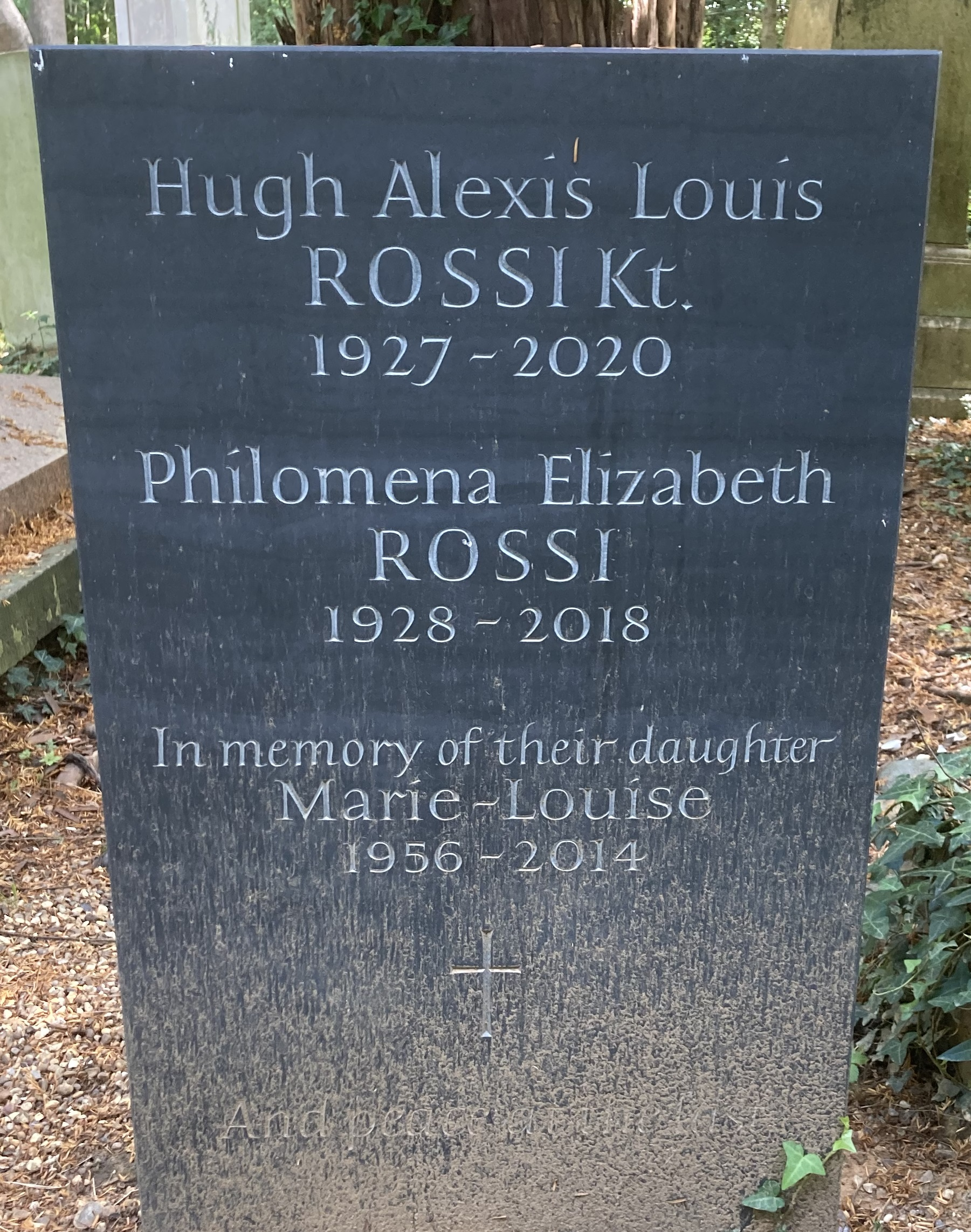
Grave of Sir Hugh Rossi in Highgate Cemetery

In 1955, Rossi married Philomena Jennings, and they had five children.

Rossi died in the London Borough of Richmond upon Thames on 14 April 2020, at the age of 92; he was buried on the western side of Highgate Cemetery.

Parliament of the United Kingdom
| Preceded by Lady Gammans | Member of Parliament for Hornsey; 1966–1983 | Constituency abolished |
| New constituency | Member of Parliament for Hornsey and Wood Green; 1983–1992 | Succeeded by Barbara Roche |
Political offices
| Preceded by Reg Prentice | Minister of State for Social Security (Minister for the Disabled); 1981–1983 | Succeeded by Rhodes Boyson |
