= Lynne Featherstone =

British Liberal Democrat Politician

The Right Honourable The Baroness Featherstone PC
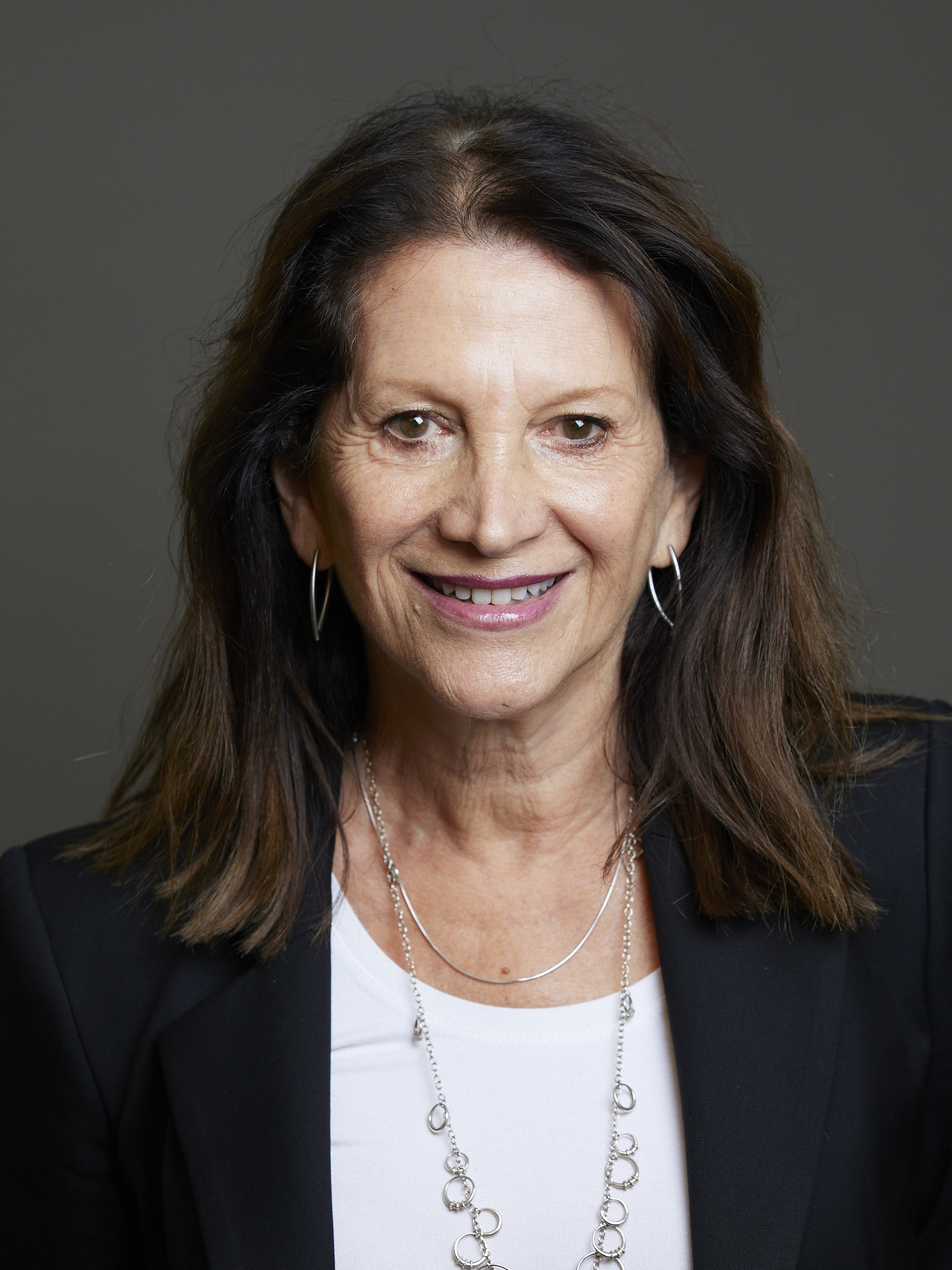
- Official portrait, 2022

Liberal Democrat Spokesperson for Energy and Climate Change
- In office 29 July 2015 – 7 February 2019
- Leader: Tim Farron; Vince Cable
- Preceded by: Ed Davey
- Succeeded by: Wera Hobhouse

Liberal Democrat Spokesperson for Home Affairs
- In office 7 January 2015 – 16 July 2015
- Leader: Nick Clegg
- Preceded by: Chris Huhne^{[a]}
- Succeeded by: Alistair Carmichael

Minister of State for Crime Prevention
- In office 4 November 2014 – 8 May 2015
- Prime Minister: David Cameron
- Preceded by: Norman Baker
- Succeeded by: The Lord Bates

Parliamentary Under-Secretary of State for International Development
- In office 4 September 2012 – 4 November 2014
- Prime Minister: David Cameron
- Preceded by: Stephen O'Brien
- Succeeded by: The Baroness Northover

Parliamentary Under-Secretary of State for Criminal information and Equalities
- In office 12 May 2010 – 4 September 2012
- Prime Minister: David Cameron
- Preceded by: Maria Eagle (Minister of State)
- Succeeded by: Helen Grant

Liberal Democrat Spokesman for Youth and Equality Issues
- In office 2 July 2007 – 12 May 2010
- Leader: Menzies Campbell; Nick Clegg
- Preceded by: Susan Kramer

Member of the House of Lords
- Lord Temporal
- Life peerage 20 October 2015

Member of Parliament for Hornsey and Wood Green
- In office 5 May 2005 – 30 March 2015
- Preceded by: Barbara Roche
- Succeeded by: Catherine West

Member of the London Assembly as an additional member
- In office 4 May 2000 – 6 June 2005
- Preceded by: Constituency created
- Succeeded by: Geoff Pope

Personal details
- Born: Lynne Choona Ryness; 20 December 1951 (age 74) Highgate, Middlesex, England
- Party: Liberal Democrats
- Spouse(s): Stephen Featherstone; 1982–96 (divorced)
- Children: 2
- Education: Oxford Polytechnic
- Profession: Businesswoman and subsequently Politician
- Featherstone's voice recorded 2012, as part of an audio description of Alexandra Palace for VocalEyes
- a. Office vacant from 12 May 2010 to 7 January 2015.

Lynne Choona Featherstone, Baroness Featherstone, PC (née Ryness; born 20 December 1951) is a British politician, businesswoman and Liberal Democrat member of the House of Lords.

Prior to entering politics, Featherstone was a successful businesswoman owning and running a London design company. She was also a director of the Ryness chain of lighting and electrical shops.

A Member of the London Assembly (MLA) from 2000 to 2005, she was Member of Parliament (MP) for Hornsey and Wood Green between 2005 and 2015, before being nominated for a peerage in the Dissolution Peerages List 2015. She was created Baroness Featherstone, of Highgate in the London Borough of Haringey on 20 October.

Under the Conservative – Liberal Democrat coalition in 2010 she was appointed as a Home Office Minister with responsibility for criminal information and equalities, before being promoted, in 2012, to Minister with responsibility for International Development. Previously she was Liberal Democrat spokesman for Youth and Equality issues, and chair of the Liberal Democrats technology board. As originator and architect of the same sex marriage law during the coalition, Featherstone launched the consultation by the UK Government on introducing same-sex marriage and was the first politician to take part in the Out4Marriage campaign, gaining a special Ben and Jerry's ice cream tub and flavour Lynne Honeycomb and returned to the Home Office as Minister of State in November 2014. Featherstone is a patron of Humanists UK.

== Early life ==
Featherstone was born and brought up in North London, and educated at Highgate Primary School, the independent South Hampstead High School (then a direct grant grammar school) and gained a Diploma in Communication and Design at Oxford Polytechnic. Her family business started by her parents was the Ryness chain of lighting and electrical shops in London. The business was sold over a decade ago.

=== Business career ===
Prior to entering politics, Featherstone was a successful businesswoman running the Ryness chain of lighting and electrical shops in London and owning and running a London design company.

=== Councillor for London Borough of Haringey 1998–2006 ===
In 1998, Featherstone was elected a Councillor for the London Borough of Haringey representing Muswell Hill Ward. She and her two colleagues (June Andersen and Julia Glenn) were the first three Liberal Democrats to be elected borough councillors. She became Leader of the Liberal Democrat Group (and thereby Opposition Leader) on the Council 1998–2003.

Although she stood down from Haringey Council before the May 2006 elections, Featherstone influenced the 2006 local elections in Haringey where Labour's majority was cut from 25 to 3, with 30 Labour Councillors elected to 27 Liberal Democrats.

=== Member of the London Assembly 2000–2005 ===
From 2000 until 2005, Featherstone was a Member of the London Assembly; during this time, she was Chair of the London Assembly Transport Committee. She was also a member of the Metropolitan Police Authority for all five years she was on the London Assembly. She was replaced as an AM by Geoff Pope.

Featherstone was promoted by some as a potential Liberal Democrat candidate for Mayor of London in the 2008 election. In response to a poll on the Liberal Democrat Voice website, she ruled herself out, stating that, of the other people in the poll, she would back Brian Paddick.

== Member of Parliament ==
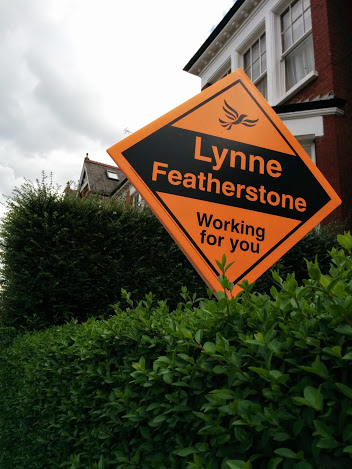
A 2015 LibDem election stakeboard for Lynne Featherstone

Featherstone first contested the Hornsey and Wood Green seat at the 1997 general election where she finished in third place some 25,998 votes behind the winner Barbara Roche. She again fought Hornsey and Wood Green at the 2001 general election, moving into second place and reducing Roche's majority to 10,614. In one of the largest swings at the 2005 general election, Featherstone defeated Roche with a majority of 2,395 votes.

She made her maiden speech in Parliament on 24 May 2005. She was appointed as a LibDem junior Home Affairs spokesperson by Charles Kennedy in 2005, and to the environment audit select committee.

She was co-chair of Chris Huhne's unsuccessful campaign to be leader of the Liberal Democrats following the resignation of Kennedy in January 2006. In March, following the election of Menzies Campbell as party leader, she was promoted to number two in the Liberal Democrat home affairs team and made London spokesperson. In December 2006, she succeeded Susan Kramer as the Liberal Democrat Shadow International Development Secretary, and two months later was succeeded by Tom Brake as London spokesperson.

In 2007, following the resignation of Sir Menzies Campbell, she again chaired Chris Huhne's leadership election campaign. On 20 December 2007 the new Liberal Democrat leader Nick Clegg, who defeated Chris Huhne, made her Youth and Equalities spokesperson.

On 5 February 2013, Featherstone voted in favour in the House of Commons Second Reading vote on same-sex marriage in the United Kingdom, the bill which she spearheaded as Minister of State at the Home Office and was passed through the Commons despite Conservative backbench MP resistance. She was given a score of 93% in favour of lesbian, gay and bisexual equality by Stonewall.

In the 2015 general election, she lost her seat to Labour's Catherine West.

=== Aftermath of death of Peter Connelly ===
Following the death of her constituent, 17-month-old Peter Connelly, Haringey Council initiated an internal audit Serious case review (SCR). Although the actual report was completed months earlier, the Executive Summary of the report was released immediately after the resulting court case had completed. The full details of the report have been kept confidential. Featherstone had been particularly critical of Haringey Council, writing "I personally met with George Meehan and Ita O'Donovan – Haringey Council's Leader and Chief Executive – to raise with them three different cases, where the pattern was in each case Haringey seeming to want to blame anyone who complained rather than to look at the complaint seriously. I was promised action – but despite repeated subsequent requests for news on progress – I was just stonewalled."

In November 2008, at Prime Minister's Questions, Featherstone asked the Prime Minister, Gordon Brown, to order an enquiry into the Connelly case.

=== Media attention ===
In April 2006, one of Featherstone's researchers received a hoax email warning about an apparent date rape drug called Progesterex. Featherstone submitted a written question to the Labour Government Minister enquiring as to "what assessment he has made of the use of Progesterex in cases of date rape". Paul Goggins's reply to the House of Commons was that Progesterex did not exist: "It has been the subject of a hoax e-mail", he answered. The hoax first originated in 1999. Featherstone criticised the Minister's response, stating "they need to do more to discover the unearthly monster who sends them out" and that "their cavalier attitude will not do". However, critics such as fellow Liberal Democrat James Graham castigated Featherstone's conduct in "criticising the Home Office for not having a response to made up drugs and made up crimes", stating "trivialising rape in this way without bothering to do basic research first doesn't help anybody".

She came to the attention of the national media in 2008 when she was criticised by Conservative Member of the London Assembly Brian Coleman for calling 999 (the UK's emergency number) when her boiler began making noises and sparking. Coleman referred to her as a "dizzy airhead", Featherstone responded by calling his comments "sexist" and "political" in nature. A London Fire Brigade spokeswoman told BBC News: "If it's obvious that there has been an ongoing problem with the boiler, then you can call a plumber. But if your boiler suddenly starts making strange noises in the middle of the night, call the fire brigade."

In January 2013, she tweeted that John Mulholland, editor of The Observer, should have been sacked for publishing a "rant against the transgender community" in Julie Burchill's column which she described as "bigoted vomit", receiving a backlash as a result.

Featherstone has expressed intentions to ban topless models from appearing on The Sun newspaper's Page 3, stating "I would love to take on Page 3".

=== Expenses ===
In April 2007, an employee in Featherstone's office over-ordered stationery reportedly worth over £22,000 in one month. On being alerted to the over-ordering, Featherstone returned all of the items involved. In a subsequent interview when challenged on the matter Featherstone responded "If I wasn't replying to people and telling them what's happened about the casework they have brought to me, there would soon be howls of protest. You can judge my overall use of expenses by the Telegraph. They called me one of their "saints"."

In May 2009, Featherstone was listed among the "saints" by The Daily Telegraph in the expenses scandal.

=== In Government ===
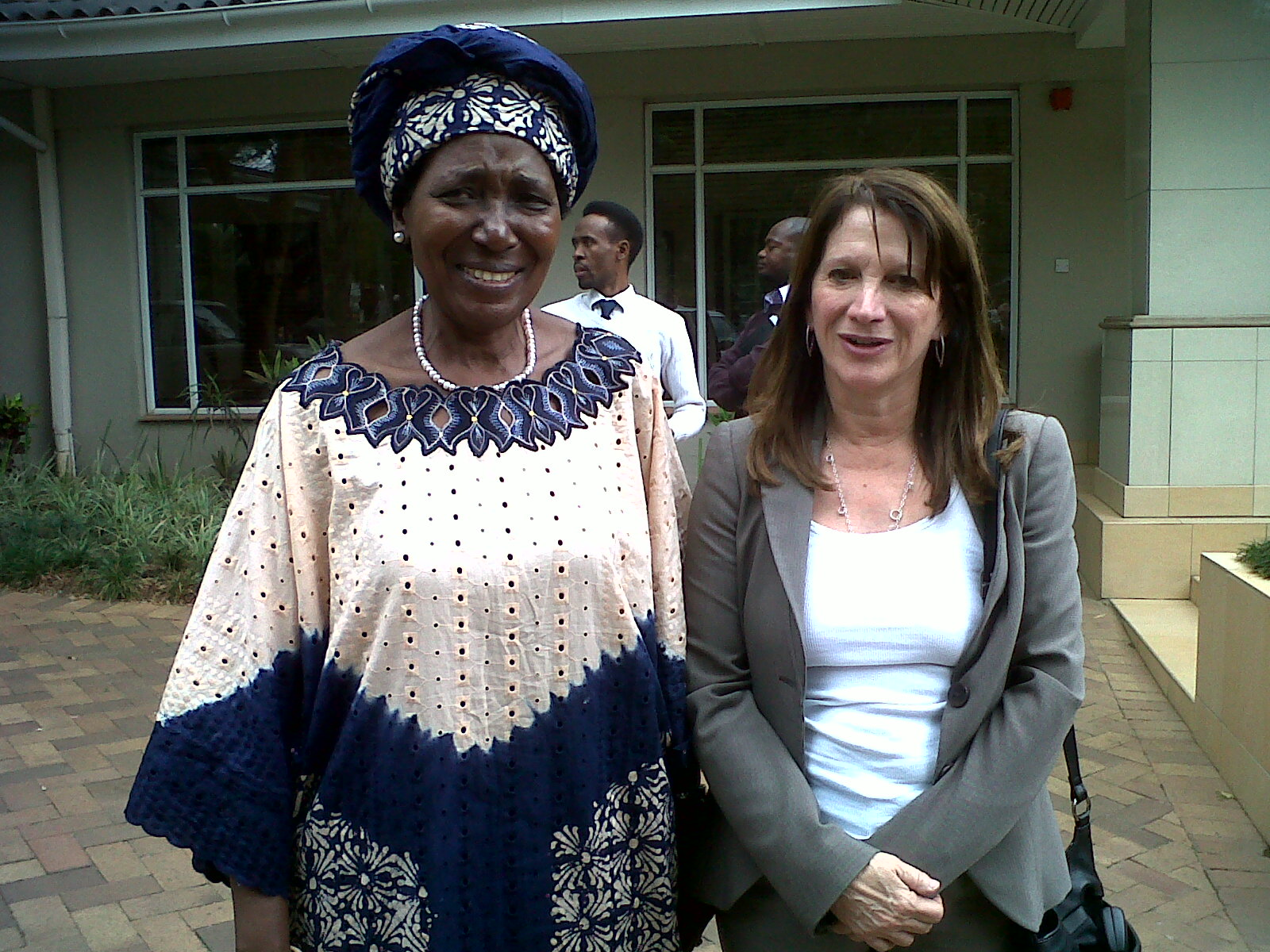
Rt Hon Lynne Featherstone MP launches 16 days of activism for the elimination of violence against women with the Minister of Gender and Child Development, Inonge Wina MP, in Zambia in November 2012.

Under the Conservative – Liberal Democrat coalition in 2010 she was appointed as a Minister in the Home Office as Parliamentary Under-Secretary for Criminal Information and Equalities. Featherstone caused waves by pre-announcing her appointment prior to the official announcement in the expectation of forcing compromises from the Tories regarding her policy "aims", despite Home Secretary Theresa May being noted for not favouring homosexual equality.

In December 2010, Featherstone introduced a move that would allow positive discrimination which is primarily aimed at addressing female under-representation in the workforce. It will also mean that a manager will be able lawfully to hire a black man over a white man, a homosexual man over a heterosexual man, if they have the same skill set. Featherstone, denied the plans were about "political correctness, or red tape, or quotas" and would "help make the workplace fairer".

In September 2011, Featherstone caused controversy by claiming men make "terrible decisions" when they are in charge. Speaking at the Liberal Democrat Party Conference Featherstone blamed men for the mess the world was in, and commentators drew parallels with similar comments by one of Featherstone's predecessors, Harriet Harman. Her comments attracted criticism from across the political spectrum and were considered particularly inappropriate given her role as a minister in charge of ending sexism. Conservative MP Priti Patel said: "these comments are really ill-thought out. As Equalities Minister she has got to be unbiased about the value that both men and women bring to decision-making." Elizabeth Day of The Observer newspaper was equally troubled by the remarks, writing "the notion that women are not as aggressive as men, that we would all just sit around a table eating red velvet cupcakes and talking out the world's problems rather than firing off phallic-shaped nuclear weapons is a complete fallacy".

On 5 September 2012 she was confirmed as Parliamentary Under-Secretary of State at the Department for International Development. Speaking at the Liberal Democrat conference in Glasgow in September 2013, she supported Liberal Democrat policy to prosecute those responsible for cases where girls are sent abroad to have female genital mutilation carried out, or where it is carried out in the UK. In November 2014, she was promoted to Minister of State for Crime Prevention going back to the Home office.

=== After Government ===
Featherstone wrote a book, Equal Ever After, describing the details of work to establish legal same-sex marriage in the United Kingdom and her role in the process.

== Awards ==
In 2006, Featherstone was shortlisted in the "Rising Stars" category of the Channel 4 political awards, but did not win.

Featherstone was nominated for the Stonewall Politician of the Year Award in both 2009 and 2012 for her work to support equality for lesbian, gay and bisexual people. She was awarded Stonewall Politician of the Year (jointly), Attitude Magazine Politician of the Year and PinkNews Ally of the Year for her initiative on same-sex marriage and work on LGBT rights.

She ranked 26 out of 50 on the Top 50 Lib Dems of 2020 list.

== Personal life ==
In 1982, she married Stephen Featherstone in Haringey. Together they have two children. The couple divorced in 1996.

Featherstone lives in Highgate, London. She is Jewish. She is an honorary associate of the National Secular Society.

Her nephew had haemophilia and was victim of the Tainted blood scandal.

Parliament of the United Kingdom
Preceded by Barbara Roche	Member of Parliament for Hornsey and Wood Green; 2005–2015	Succeeded by Catherine West
