= British Syrian Society =

British pro-Assad lobbying group

The British Syrian Society is an association set up to promote relations between the former Ba'athist government of Syria and the United Kingdom. It was established in 2003 by Fawaz Akhras, father-in-law of Bashar al-Assad. Its current directors include Akhras, Lord Asquith, Lord Green of Deddington, Major-General John Holmes, and Peter Ford, former British ambassador to Syria.

As part of its lobbying work, the Society has over the years hosted visits to Syria by several Members of Parliament. Several of these subsequently voted against the Cameron–Clegg coalition government in 2013 on the issue of British military intervention in the Syrian civil war including Richard Shepherd, Crispin Blunt, and David TC Davies.

In September 2011, the HSBC bank said it would no longer represent the Society.

In 2012, its co-chair Sir Andrew Green, a former British ambassador to Syria, resigned after emails showed Dr Akhras had advised Assad on how to rebut evidence of civilians apparently being tortured. Dr Akhras had used a private email channel to the Syrian leader to offer advice on how the Syrian government should handle criticism of its suppression of the opposition uprising, including how to counter video footage appearing to show the torture of children.

Other resignations included the society's treasurer, Brian Constant, and Sir Gavyn Arthur, a former Lord Mayor of London.

In 2016, the BSS organised an international conference in Damascus, described by the Council for Arab-British Understanding as a Syrian government "PR exercise". Speakers included Bouthaina Shaaban, Ali Haidar and Fares Shehabi. Sir Andrew Green was re-appointed as Director of the Society in 2018.

== See also ==
- Premiership of David Cameron § Syria
- William Hague § Syria
