= Migration Matters Trust =

The Migration Matters Trust is a British campaign formed by a cross-party politicians, business executives and trade unionists and set up in 2013.

Their stated aim is to establish "an open and honest debate about the issues of migration" that "acknowledge[s] the positives of migration, while directly confronting the challenges".

The Trust is co-chaired by Labour ex-MP Barbara Roche, Conservative MP Nadhim Zahawi and Liberal Democrat Lord Navnit Dholakia.

The trust is seen generally as a counter weight to Migrationwatch.
