= Four Dwellings Academy =

Location
- Dwellings Lane; Quinton, Birmingham, West Midlands, B32 1RJ; England; 52.4556°N 2.003°W

Information
- Type: Academy
- Established: 1940
- Department for Education URN: 139047 Tables
- Ofsted: Reports
- Principal: Claire Stoneman
- Gender: Co-educational
- Age: 11 to 16
- Enrolment: 600
- Website: https://sites.google.com/a/aetinet.org/four-dwellings-academy/

Four Dwellings Academy (formerly Four Dwellings High School) is a co-educational school with academy status, located in the Quinton area of Birmingham, England. It opened in 2020 on Quinton Road West. The old Upper School building on Dwellings Lane was opened in 1954 by Florence Horsbrugh, Minister of Education as the Four Dwellings Girls' School and catered for 600 pupils. On opening, the building had an entrance hall with murals and a goldfish pool, a theatre with facilities to build stage scenery and a "miniature" flat for domestic science classes. The boys' school was situated in older buildings. The school went co-educational in 1970. The school held specialist Science College status before converting to academy status in March 2013.

The academy is now situated solely on the old girls school building and has approximately 450 members.

== Notable former pupils ==
- David Allen Green, lawyer and writer; legal correspondent for the Financial Times
- Joleon Lescott, Aaron Lescott, Daniel Sturridge, Temitope Obadeyi, Stephen Turnbull, Amari'i Bell - Professional footballers
