= Michael West (journalist) =

Australian investigative journalist

- Occupation: Investigative journalist
- Organisation: Michael West Media
- Relatives: Catherine West (sister)

Michael West is an Australian investigative journalist. He is the founder of Michael West Media, a news website specialising in investigative journalism in the areas of business, finance, tax, and energy.

== Early life and education ==
West is the son of the late Rod West, a former headmaster of Trinity Grammar School in Sydney. His sister is Catherine West, a British MP.

Prior to journalism, West worked for a number of years as a stockbroker.

In November 2016, he received the honorary title of adjunct professor from the University of Sydney.

== Journalism career ==
West's career in journalism began at The Australian Financial Review. He later wrote a column at The Australian newspaper titled 'Margin Call', for which he was praised by the founder of Crikey, Stephen Mayne; as being 'one of the few financial journalists out there having a go at some of the business practices employed by the likes of Macquarie Bank and Babcock & Brown'. In 2005, he won the business journalism Walkley Award for his article at The Australian titled "Allstate".

He later became business editor and commentator at the Sydney Morning Herald. At the SMH his writing was particularly focused upon the Australian tax interests of multinational companies including Twitter, Google, and Facebook. His stories about tax evasion by multinationals, and corruption in the Australian electricity sector contributed to the establishment of two Senate Inquiries.

In May 2016, West was part of an estimated 30 forced redundancies made by Fairfax Media. In an interview, West described the situation at Fairfax as 'grim' and accused the publisher of pursuing a click-bait strategy. He subsequently launched his own independent YouTube channel, The West Report.

In October 2026, West claimed that the attempted hijacking of Flydubai Flight 1073 was "probably" a false flag operation conducted by Israel. The Australian Broadcasting Corporation's Media Watch criticised West for promoting conspiracy theories.
