= Progesterex =

Urban legend

Progesterex is a fictitious date rape drug that would purportedly cause sterilization. It is part of a hoax that began to circulate in 1999 via e-mail on the internet. No actual drug by this name or even with these properties exists, and no such incident has ever been documented or confirmed. The most high profile person falling for the hoax was British MP Lynne Featherstone, who asked a question about the fake drug in Parliament.

== Email contents ==
Typical contents of the e-mail hoax are as follows, although different versions tend to turn up over time:

"A woman at a nightclub called _______ on Saturday night was taken by 5 men, who according to hospital and police reports, gang raped her before dumping her. Unable to remember the events of the evening, tests later confirmed the repeat rapes along with traces of Rohypnol in her blood and Progesterex, essentially a small sterilization pill. The drug is now being used by rapists at parties to rape AND sterilize their victims. Progesterex is available to vets to sterilize large animals. Progesterex is being used together with Rohypnol, the date rape drug. As with Rohypnol, all they have to do is drop it into the girl's drink. The girl can't remember a thing the next morning, of all that had taken place the night before. Progesterex, which dissolves in drinks just as easily, is such that the victim doesn't conceive from the rape and the rapist needn't worry about having a paternity test identifying him months later. The drug's effects ARE NOT TEMPORARY - Progesterex was designed to sterilize horses. Any female who takes it WILL NEVER BE ABLE TO CONCEIVE. The weasels can get this drug from anyone who is in the vet school or any university. It's that easy, and Progesterex is about to break out big on campuses everywhere. Believe it or not, there are even sites on the Internet telling people how to use it. Please forward this to everyone you know, especially girls. Be careful when you're out and don't leave your drink unattended. Please make the effort to forward this on to all you know. Guys, please inform all your female friends and relatives."

== Debunking ==
There is no "sterilization pill" under any name that exists for sterilizing horses. Sterilization of male horses is performed surgically, while mares are usually left unaltered.

== Notable examples ==
A version of this e-mail was translated and sent around in Brazil in 2008–2009.

A version of this hoax also made the rounds via bulletins on MySpace, Bebo, Facebook, and Tagged and in the form of a group named "Heads Up Ladies".

According to the Spanish language website VSAntirus.com at least two versions in Spanish have made the rounds since 2001 as well.

A Swedish and later Norwegian version circulated 2008–2009 with a signature of Birgitta Olofsson, Dr Med in nursing science of Umeå University.

== UK Parliament incident ==
On 18 April 2006 UK Member of Parliament Lynne Featherstone submitted a Written Question to the Home Secretary on whether the Home Office had calculated the number of date rape incidents that had been connected with Progesterex. Home Office Minister Paul Goggins replied that "Progesterex does not exist".

Featherstone criticised the government stating they "need to do more to discover the unearthly monster who sends them out" and that "their cavalier attitude will not do." However, critics such as fellow Liberal Democrat James Graham castigated Featherstone's conduct in "criticising the Home Office for not having a response to made up drugs and made up crimes", stating "trivialising rape in this way without bothering to do basic research first doesn’t help anybody".

Many see the incident as having strong parallels with a previous case where MP David Amess asked a question in Parliament about a fictitious drug called "Cake".

== See also ==
- Brass Eye
