= Barbara Roche =

British politician

Minister for Social Exclusion
- In office 29 May 2002 – 13 June 2003
- Prime Minister: Tony Blair
- Preceded by: Office established
- Succeeded by: Phil Woolas

Minister of State for Women
- In office 8 June 2001 – 13 June 2003 Serving with The Baroness Morgan of Huyton (2001)
- Prime Minister: Tony Blair
- Preceded by: Tessa Jowell
- Succeeded by: Jacqui Smith

Minister of State for Asylum and Immigration
- In office 29 July 1999 – 11 June 2001
- Prime Minister: Tony Blair
- Preceded by: Office established
- Succeeded by: The Lord Rooker

Financial Secretary to the Treasury
- In office 4 January 1999 – 29 July 1999
- Prime Minister: Tony Blair
- Preceded by: Dawn Primarolo
- Succeeded by: Stephen Timms

Member of Parliament for Hornsey and Wood Green
- In office 9 April 1992 – 11 April 2005
- Preceded by: Hugh Rossi
- Succeeded by: Lynne Featherstone

Personal details
- Born: Barbara Maureen Margolis; 13 April 1954 (age 72) Bethnal Green, London, England
- Party: Labour
- Spouse: Patrick Roche (m. 1977)
- Education: Lady Margaret Hall, Oxford

Barbara Maureen Roche (née Margolis; born 13 April 1954) is a British Labour politician, who was the Member of Parliament (MP) for Hornsey and Wood Green from 1992 until 2005, when she lost her seat to the Liberal Democrats, despite having enjoyed a majority of over 10,000 in the 2001 general election.

== Early life and education ==
Born to an Ashkenazi Jewish father with roots in Poland, and a Sephardic Jewish mother, the daughter of Barnet and Hanna Margolis, Roche was educated at the Jews Free School, Camden Town and Lady Margaret Hall, Oxford, where she read Philosophy, Politics and Economics (PPE). She trained to be a barrister and was called to the bar at the Middle Temple in 1977.

== Political career ==
She first stood for Parliament in the 1984 Surrey South-West by-election, a Conservative-held seat, in which Roche came a distant third as the Labour candidate. This was followed by an unsuccessful candidacy for the marginal seat of Hornsey and Wood Green at the 1987 general election, when she failed to unset the incumbent MP Hugh Rossi.

Roche ran again in Hornsey and Wood Green at the 1992 general election. Rossi was not standing for Parliament, and had been replaced by Andrew Boff as the Conservative candidate. This time, Roche gained the seat for Labour, despite her party losing nationally. She saw her majority soar to 20,500 in 1997, when she polled 25,000 votes more than the Liberal Democrats' candidate, Lynne Featherstone.

However, by 2001, Roche's majority had almost halved to 10,500, with a substantial swing to the Liberal Democrats, who had again selected Featherstone as their candidate. A local newspaper described Roche in January 2005 as "a fiercely loyal Labour MP, who has only rebelled against the Government in four out of 1,570 votes."

During her time in Government, she held several ministerial offices; Parliamentary Under-Secretary of State, Department of Trade and Industry, 1997–1998; Financial Secretary to the Treasury, 1999; Minister of State for Asylum and Immigration, Home Office, 1999–2001; Cabinet Office, 2001–2002; Office of the Deputy Prime Minister, 2002–2003.

At the 2005 general election, Roche unexpectedly lost her seat on another large 14.6% swing (14.6%) to the Liberal Democrats, with Featherstone succeeding her as the constituency's MP.

=== Views on immigration ===
"I wanted to be the first immigration minister to say immigration is a good thing (...) We have a multiracial, multicultural society; we are a stronger country for it."

— Barbara Roche interviewed by the New Statesman, 2000

Roche was a strong supporter of a liberal immigration policy to the United Kingdom, and advocated for increased immigration during her time as Minister of State for Asylum and Immigration. Among her reasons for this, she included using migration to free up skills shortages, respond to the country's demographic ageing and for economic growth.

In September 2000, she gave a speech outlining her desires to liberalize the United Kingdom's immigration policy, calling for what the government termed as 'managed migration'. She believed that the benefits of migration should be shown by emphasizing the ethnic diversity of the United Kingdom and migrants' contribution to the country, in similar ways to countries like the United States, Australia and Canada, for example. She also advocated for a "US style citizenship ceremony to ensure immigrants attached symbolic importance to their acceptance into British society."

Similarly, Roche was also a supporter of multiculturalism, and attached this to her Jewishness and immigrant parents, stating; "My being Jewish informs me totally, informs my politics. I understand the otherness of ethnic groups. The Americans are ahead of us on things like multiple identity. I'm Jewish but I'm also a Londoner; I'm English but also British."

After she quit parliamentary politics, she became chair of the Migration Museum Project, co-founded the Migration Matters Trust and several other organizations in the migration field.

== After Parliament ==
After her defeat in 2005, and prior to the 2010 general election, Roche attempted to re-enter the Commons, seeking the Labour Party nomination (and being shortlisted) in the 'safe' Labour seats of Stockton North, Houghton & Sunderland South, Wigan, and Stalybridge & Hyde, but was not selected for any of them, despite the support of the Labour-affiliated Unite union.

== Personal life ==
Margolis married Patrick Roche in 1977, and the couple have a daughter. Outside politics, she lists her recreations as theatre and detective fiction.

Parliament of the United Kingdom
Preceded by Sir Hugh Rossi	Member of Parliament for Hornsey and Wood Green; 1992–2005	Succeeded by Lynne Featherstone
Political offices
Preceded by Dawn Primarolo	Financial Secretary to the Treasury; 1999	Succeeded by Stephen Timms
