= Alp Mehmet =

British diplomat (born 1948)

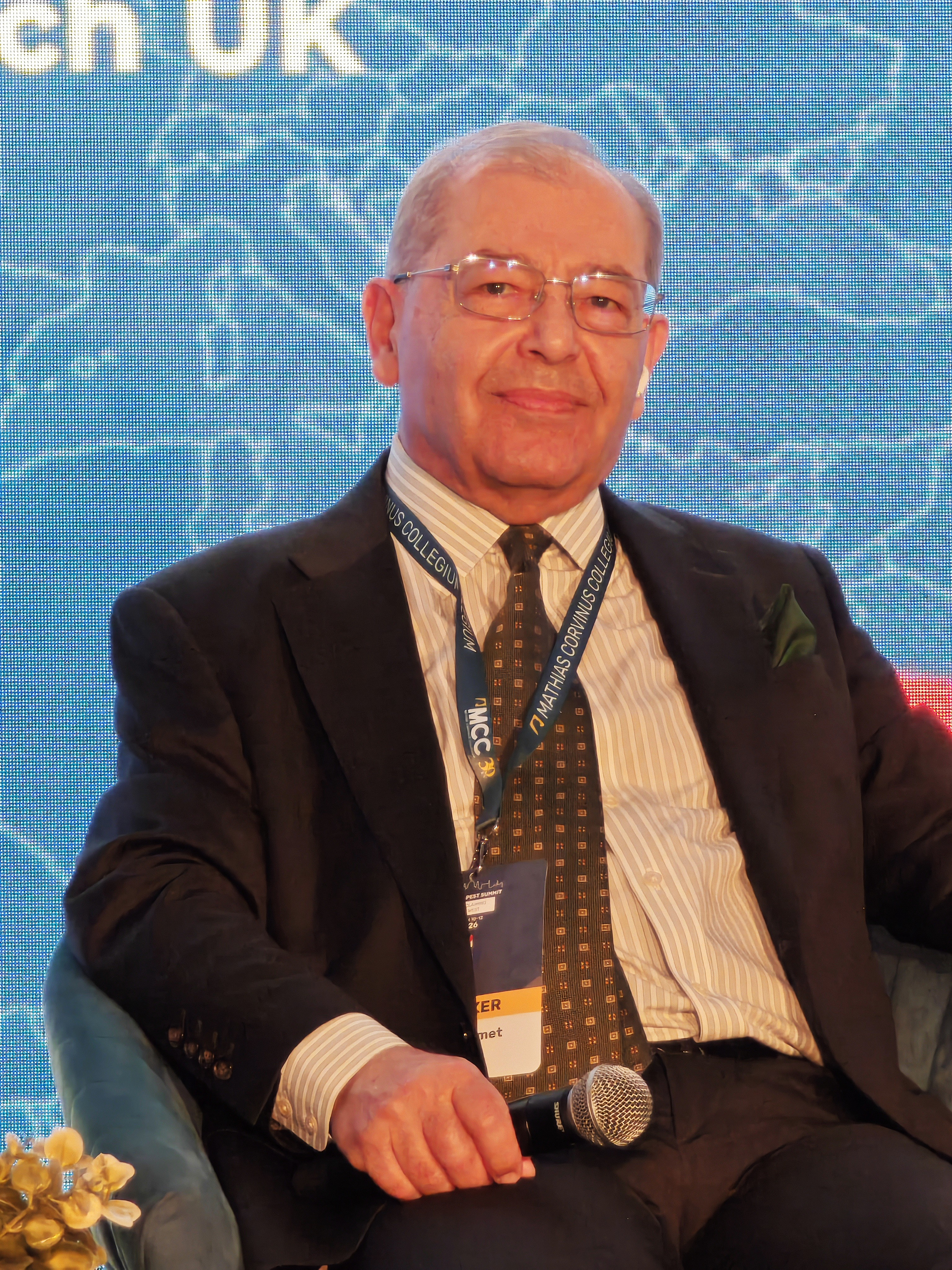
Alp Mehmet at MCC Budapest

Alper Mehmet MVO (born 28 August 1948) is a British former diplomat and one of the United Kingdom's first two ethnic minority ambassadors, along with Anwar Choudhury.

== Early life ==
Mehmet arrived in the United Kingdom from Cyprus in 1956 when he was eight, as a British citizen but unable to speak English. Mehmet was educated at Parmiter's School near London, and at Bristol Polytechnic (now the University of the West of England).

== Career ==
On graduation from Bristol, Mehmet became an immigration officer (1970–79) and then an entry clearance officer in Lagos, Nigeria (1979–83). In 1983, he entered Her Majesty's Diplomatic Service, serving in Romania, Germany and Iceland (twice) and leaving in 2008. When Mehmet was appointed as Ambassador to Iceland in 2004, he became one of the first two British ambassadors from ethnic minority backgrounds to be appointed (the other being Anwar Choudhury, who was appointed High Commissioner to Bangladesh). Mehmet became Chairman of Migration Watch UK in July 2019.

== Honours ==
Mehmet was appointed a Member of the Royal Victorian Order on 26 June 1990.

Diplomatic posts
Preceded by John Culver	Ambassador to Iceland; 2004–2008	Succeeded by Ian Whitting
