= Italia Conti =

English actress (1873–1946)

- Conti before 1902
- Born: 1873; London, England
- Died: 8 February 1946 (aged 72–73); Evelyn Cottage, Southbourne, Dorset, England
- Occupation: Actress
- Known for: Founder of the Italia Conti Academy of Theatre Arts

Italia Emily Stella Conti (1873 – 8 February 1946) was an English actress and the founder of the Italia Conti Academy of Theatre Arts in London.

== Life ==
Italia Emily Stella Conti was born in London in 1873 to Luigi Conti, an Italian opera singer and member of Garibaldi's Mille expedition, and his English wife Emily Mary Castle (1843–1914). The family moved to Brighton. Luigi Conti died in 1917 in Brookwood Asylum. Italia was educated in Haywards Heath and at Kensington Academy.

Conti wrote to Ellen Terry, who arranged acting lessons for her. Her debut as an actress was a small part in The Last Word at the Lyceum Theatre, London.

Conti helped to train a young Gertrude Lawrence without charge (Gertrude's family was unable to pay) and get her a start in theatre. In 1908, Lawrence's mother, Alice, was working for extra money in the chorus of the Christmas pantomime at Brixton Theatre when she heard about Conti, now 35, who was teaching dance, elocution and the rudiments of acting. Gertrude auditioned for Conti, who decided the 10-year-old Gertrude was talented enough to warrant free lessons. Lawrence later joined Where the Rainbow Ends, on which Conti was working. Conti's training also would lead to Lawrence's appearance in Max Reinhardt's The Miracle, staged in London and Fifinella, directed by Basil Dean, for the Liverpool Repertory Theatre (now the Liverpool Playhouse).

Charles Hawtrey had asked Italia Conti to train the children to act in Where the Rainbow Ends. Doing this led to Conti's founding of her drama school, the Italia Conti Academy of Theatre Arts. In 1925, the academy moved to Lamb's Conduit Street. Bombing in May 1940 destroyed the building, and Conti faced a serious financial loss. The school would be revived, however, at the Tavistock Little Theatre in Bloomsbury.

Conti's pupil, Gertrude Lawrence, went on to be a great star of the theatre.

Italia Conti died at Evelyn Cottage, Southbourne, Bournemouth, on 8 February 1946. Her school survives into the 21st century and has moved into a purpose-built facility in Woking, Surrey.
