= Hornsey and Wood Green =

UK Parliament constituency (1983–2024)

Coordinates: 51.590°N 0.133°W

- Former borough constituency for the House of Commons
- Boundary of Hornsey and Wood Green in Greater London
- County: Greater London
- Electorate: 79,878 (December 2010)

1983–2024
- Seats: One
- Created from: Hornsey and Wood Green
- Replaced by: Hornsey and Friern Barnet, Southgate and Wood Green

Hornsey and Wood Green was a constituency in Greater London created in 1983 and represented in the House of Commons of the UK Parliament from 2015 until its abolition for the 2024 general election by Catherine West, of the Labour Party.

Under the 2023 review of Westminster constituencies, the majority of the constituency was incorporated into the newly created seat of Hornsey and Friern Barnet, with the district of Wood Green included in the new Southgate and Wood Green constituency, and Highgate ward in the re-established seat of Hampstead and Highgate.

== Boundaries ==
Map of boundaries 2010–2024

1983–2010: The London Borough of Haringey wards of Alexandra, Archway, Bowes Park, Crouch End, Fortis Green, Highgate, Hornsey Central, Hornsey Vale, Muswell Hill, Noel Park, South Hornsey, Woodside.

2010–2024: The London Borough of Haringey wards of Alexandra, Bounds Green, Crouch End, Fortis Green, Highgate, Hornsey, Muswell Hill, Noel Park, Stroud Green, Woodside.

== Constituency profile ==
The constituency covered the western part of the London Borough of Haringey, stretching from Highgate in the south west of the seat, through Muswell Hill, Crouch End and Wood Green in the north east corner of the seat.

More out-of-work benefits reliance (8.9%) exists in the seat than the London average (8.4%, which is compares to 6.4% nationally in April 2021) and among those aged 18 to 24 the percentage is 12.7% in the seat during the COVID-19 pandemic recovery. Women, living in the constituency, working full time at this time earned £102 per week more than men, earning 98% of the London average pay; whereas for men the figure was 79% of London's average pay and which was £50 below the national average.

Political history

The seat created in 1983 has had representation by the three largest English political parties at Westminster.

The win from the incumbent Liberal Democrat in 2015 by Labour Party's candidate was a strong swing and made the seat the 137th safest of Labour's 232 seats by percentage of majority.

2016 EU Referendum

In the 2016 United Kingdom European Union membership referendum, the constituency is estimated to have voted between 66% and 82% to Remain in the EU.

== History ==
The constituency was created in 1983 from the safe Conservative seat of Hornsey and the more Labour-inclined Wood Green. In those boundary changes the Wood Green seat was broadly divided into two, with half being merged with Hornsey and the rest being transferred to the neighbouring constituency of Tottenham, to the east — a very small part of the Hornsey seat was also transferred to Tottenham at the same time.

This was a Conservative Party seat until 1992 but by 1997 swung so heavily it suggested a Labour Party safe seat — Barbara Roche enjoyed a majority of over 20,000. The Liberal Democrats, however, supplanted those parties in the area, both at Parliamentary level where they won the seat in 2005 and held it until 2015; and in local terms. (Note: At local level the London Borough of Haringey's Council was until the 2014 local elections split almost straight down the middle in political terms – the western part that forms this seat returning Liberal Democrat councillors, while the eastern part that forms Tottenham being solidly Labour. However, at the 2014 elections Labour gained a number of seats particularly in Stroud Green and Crouch End) At the 2015 election this seat had the lowest combined Conservative and UKIP percentage in England (11.45%).

The seat had a large swing to Labour of over 15% in the 2017 general election, similar to that of two years earlier, meaning it had a history of political volatility; in five out of seven general elections, there were swings to Labour or the Liberal Democrats of between 13 and 16%.

== Members of Parliament ==
Election	Member	Party
1983	Hugh Rossi	Conservative
1992	Barbara Roche	Labour
2005	Lynne Featherstone	Liberal Democrats
2015	Catherine West	Labour

== Election results ==
=== Elections in the 2010s ===
General election 2019: Hornsey and Wood Green
Party	Candidate	Votes	%	±%
Labour	Catherine West	35,126	57.5	−7.9
Liberal Democrats	Dawn Barnes	15,884	26.0	+10.0
Conservative	Ed McGuinness	6,829	11.2	−3.6
Green	Jarelle Francis	2,192	3.6	+1.7
Brexit Party	Daniel Corrigan	763	1.2	New
CPA	Helen Spiby-Vann	211	0.3	+0.2
Independent	Salah Wakie	100	0.2	New
Majority		19,242	31.5	−17.9
Turnout		61,105	74.7	−3.2
Registered electors		81,814		
Labour hold		Swing	−9.0	

General election 2017: Hornsey and Wood Green
Party	Candidate	Votes	%	±%
Labour	Catherine West	40,738	65.4	+14.5
Liberal Democrats	Dawn Barnes	10,000	16.0	−15.8
Conservative	Emma Lane	9,246	14.8	+5.5
Green	Sam Hall	1,181	1.9	−3.5
Women's Equality	Nimco Ali	551	0.8	New
UKIP	Ruth Price	429	0.6	−1.6
CPA	Helen Spiby-Vann	93	0.1	New
Workers Revolutionary	Anna Athow	55	0.1	New
Majority		30,738	49.4	+30.3
Turnout		62,293	77.9	+5.0
Registered electors		79,946		
Labour hold		Swing	+15.1	

General election 2015: Hornsey and Wood Green
Party	Candidate	Votes	%	±%
Labour	Catherine West	29,417	50.9	+16.9
Liberal Democrats	Lynne Featherstone	18,359	31.8	−14.7
Conservative	Suhail Rahuja	5,347	9.3	−7.4
Green	Gordon Peters	3,146	5.4	+3.1
UKIP	Clive Morrison	1,271	2.2	New
CPA	Helen Spiby-Vann	118	0.2	New
Workers Revolutionary	Frank Sweeney	82	0.1	New
Hoi Polloi	Geoff Moseley	45	0.1	New
Majority		11,058	19.1	N/A
Turnout		57,785	72.9	+4.0
Registered electors		79,247		
Labour gain from Liberal Democrats		Swing	+15.8	

General election 2010: Hornsey and Wood Green
Party	Candidate	Votes	%	±%
Liberal Democrats	Lynne Featherstone	25,595	46.5	+3.2
Labour	Karen Jennings	18,720	34.0	−4.3
Conservative	Richard Merrin	9,174	16.7	+4.0
Green	Pete McAskie	1,261	2.3	−2.7
Independent	Stephane de Roche	201	0.4	New
Independent	Rohen Kapur	91	0.2	New
Majority		6,875	12.5	+7.5
Turnout		55,042	68.9	+7.1
Registered electors		78,748		
Liberal Democrats hold		Swing	+3.7	

=== Elections in the 2000s ===
General election 2005: Hornsey and Wood Green
Party	Candidate	Votes	%	±%
Liberal Democrats	Lynne Featherstone	20,512	43.3	+17.5
Labour	Barbara Roche	18,117	38.3	−11.6
Conservative	Peter J. Forrest	6,014	12.7	−3.0
Green	Jayne E. Forbes	2,377	5.0	−0.1
UKIP	Roy A. Freshwater	310	0.7	New
Majority		2,395	5.0	N/A
Turnout		47,330	61.8	+3.8
Registered electors		76,630		
Liberal Democrats gain from Labour		Swing	+14.6	

General election 2001: Hornsey and Wood Green
Party	Candidate	Votes	%	±%
Labour	Barbara Roche	21,967	49.9	−11.8
Liberal Democrats	Lynne Featherstone	11,353	25.8	+14.5
Conservative	Jason D. Hollands	6,921	15.7	−6.2
Green	Jayne E. Forbes	2,228	5.1	+2.7
Socialist Alliance	Louise Christian	1,106	2.5	New
Socialist Labour	Ella J. Rule	294	0.7	−0.4
Reform 2000	Erdil Ataman	194	0.4	New
Majority		10,614	24.1	−15.7
Turnout		44,063	58.0	−11.1
Registered electors		75,974		
Labour hold		Swing	−13.2	

=== Elections in the 1990s ===
General election 1997: Hornsey and Wood Green
Party	Candidate	Votes	%	±%
Labour	Barbara Roche	31,792	61.7	+13.2
Conservative	Helena D. Hart	11,293	21.9	−17.3
Liberal Democrats	Lynne Featherstone	5,794	11.3	+1.4
Green	Hilary J. Jago	1,214	2.4	+0.5
Referendum	Rachel Miller	808	1.6	New
Socialist Labour	Pat W. Sikorski	586	1.1	New
Majority		20,499	39.8	+30.5
Turnout		51,487	69.1	−6.6
Registered electors		74,537		
Labour hold		Swing	+15.3	

General election 1992: Hornsey and Wood Green
Party	Candidate	Votes	%	±%
Labour	Barbara Roche	27,020	48.5	+8.5
Conservative	Andrew Boff	21,843	39.2	−3.8
Liberal Democrats	Peter Dunphy	5,547	10.0	−5.2
Green	Elizabeth Crosby	1,051	1.9	−0.1
Natural Law	P.R.G. Davies	197	0.4	New
Revolutionary Communist	William Massey	89	0.2	New
Majority		5,177	9.3	N/A
Turnout		55,747	75.9	+2.5
Registered electors		73,491		
Labour gain from Conservative		Swing	+6.1	

=== Elections in the 1980s ===
General election 1987: Hornsey and Wood Green
Party	Candidate	Votes	%	±%
Conservative	Hugh Rossi	25,397	43.0	+0.5
Labour	Barbara Roche	23,618	40.0	+4.9
SDP	Douglas Eden	8,928	15.1	−5.8
Green	Elizabeth Crosby	1,154	1.9	+0.3
Majority		1,779	3.0	−4.4
Turnout		59,097	73.3	+2.1
Registered electors		80,594		
Conservative hold		Swing	–2.2	

General election 1983: Hornsey and Wood Green
Party	Candidate	Votes	%	±%
Conservative	Hugh Rossi	22,323	42.4	–4.8
Labour	Valerie A. Veness	18,424	35.0	–5.0
SDP	Michael I. Burrell	10,995	20.9	+9.8
Ecology	Peter S.I. Lang	854	1.6	New
Majority		3,899	7.5	+0.2
Turnout		52,596	71.2	
Registered electors		73,870		
Conservative win (new seat)				

1979 notional result
Party	Vote	%
Conservative	27,750	47.3
Labour	23,494	40.0
Liberal	6,528	11.1
Others	949	1.6
Turnout	58,721	
Electorate		

== See also ==
- Parliamentary constituencies in London
