= David Coleman (demographer) =

English demographer (born 1946)

David Anwyll Coleman (born 1946) is a demographer and anthropologist who served as the Professor of Demography at the Department of Social Policy and Intervention, University of Oxford from October 2002 until 2013, and a lecturer since 1980.

== Early life ==
Coleman was born in 1946 in London, England. He was educated at St Benedict's School, Ealing.

== University education ==
In 1967, Coleman graduated from Oxford University with a Bachelor of Arts in Zoology. In 1978, Coleman graduated from the London School of Economics with a Ph.D. in Demography.

== Career ==
Between 1985 and 1987 he worked for the British Government, as the Special Adviser to Home Secretary Douglas Hurd and then to the Ministers of Housing and of the Environment. He is a former fellow of St John's College, Oxford.

Coleman has published over 90 papers and eight books and was the joint editor of the European Journal of Population from 1992 to 2000. In 1997 he was elected to the Council of the International Union for the Scientific Study of Population. He is also an advisor to Migration Watch UK, which he helped to found, and is a member of the Galton Institute, formerly known as the Eugenics Society; however, the Institute at the time did not do "research into eugenics".

In 2013, Coleman's analysis said that White British people would be a minority in the UK around 2066 if current immigration trends continued.
