= Fawaz Akhras =

Syrian-English cardiologist

- Born: September 1946 (age 80)
- Citizenship: Syrian; British
- Occupation: Cardiologist
- Spouse: Sahar Otri
- Children: Asma al-Assad

Fawas Akhras (Arabic: فواز أخرس; born September 1946) is a British-Syrian cardiologist known for being the father-in-law of former Syrian president Bashar al-Assad and chairman of the British Syrian Society.

== Biography ==
Akhras was raised a Sunni Muslim in the city of Homs. He qualified in medicine in 1973.

Akhras has been described as "a key figure in liaison between the Syrian and British governments". He is the founder of the British Syrian Society and is involved with a number of Syrian causes.

He was a consultant interventional cardiologist at the Cromwell Hospital in South Kensington, London, but the hospital no longer lists him on their website. He practises at his private medical clinic, Cardiac Healthcare Services, in Harley Street, London. He lives in Acton, London, and is married to former diplomat Sahar Otri al-Akhras (née Otri). Their daughter, Asma, married then Syrian president Bashar al-Assad in 2000.

It was reported before the Syrian civil war that Akhras had influence on the Syrian president in domestic affairs. On 15 March 2012, The Guardian published allegedly intercepted emails appearing to show that he was advising the Syrian president from the UK during the crackdown on anti-regime protesters. According to The Guardian, Akhras used a private email channel to the Syrian president offering advice on how his government should spin its suppression of the uprising, including how best to rebut apparent video footage of Syrian forces torturing children. Speaking to The Telegraph in 2012, Akhras drew comparisons between the start of the Syrian civil war and the 2011 England riots. On 9 December 2024, the day after the fall of the Assad regime, Akhras was sanctioned by the U.S. Treasury Department for providing "support and facilitation to Bashar al-Assad in financial matters, sanctions evasion, and efforts to secure international political engagement."
