= Tottenham Green =

Tottenham Green could refer to:

- Tottenham Green (park), an open space in the London Borough of Haringey
- Tottenham Green (ward), an electoral ward that existed from 2002 to 2022
