= Municipal Borough of Hornsey =

Former local government district in England

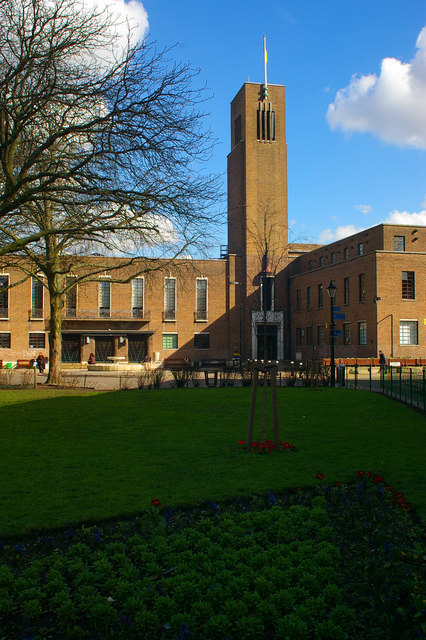
- Hornsey Town Hall was the borough council's headquarters from 1935

- Hornsey highlighted within Middlesex, in 1961
- Area
  - 1901: 2,875 acres (11.6 km^{2})
  - 1961: 2,871 acres (11.6 km^{2})
  - Coordinates: 51.58°N 0.12°W
- Population
  - 1901: 72,056
  - 1931: 87,659
  - 1939: 72,436
  - 1961: 97,962
- History
  - Preceded by: Part of the parish of Hornsey
  - Origin: Public Health Act 1848; Local Government Act 1894
  - Created: 1867
  - Abolished: 31 March 1965
  - Succeeded by: London Borough of Haringey
- Government
  - Type: Local board 1867–1894; Urban district 1894–1903; Municipal borough 1903–1965
  - HQ: Hornsey Town Hall
  - Motto: Fortior quo paratior (Latin for 'The better prepared, the stronger')
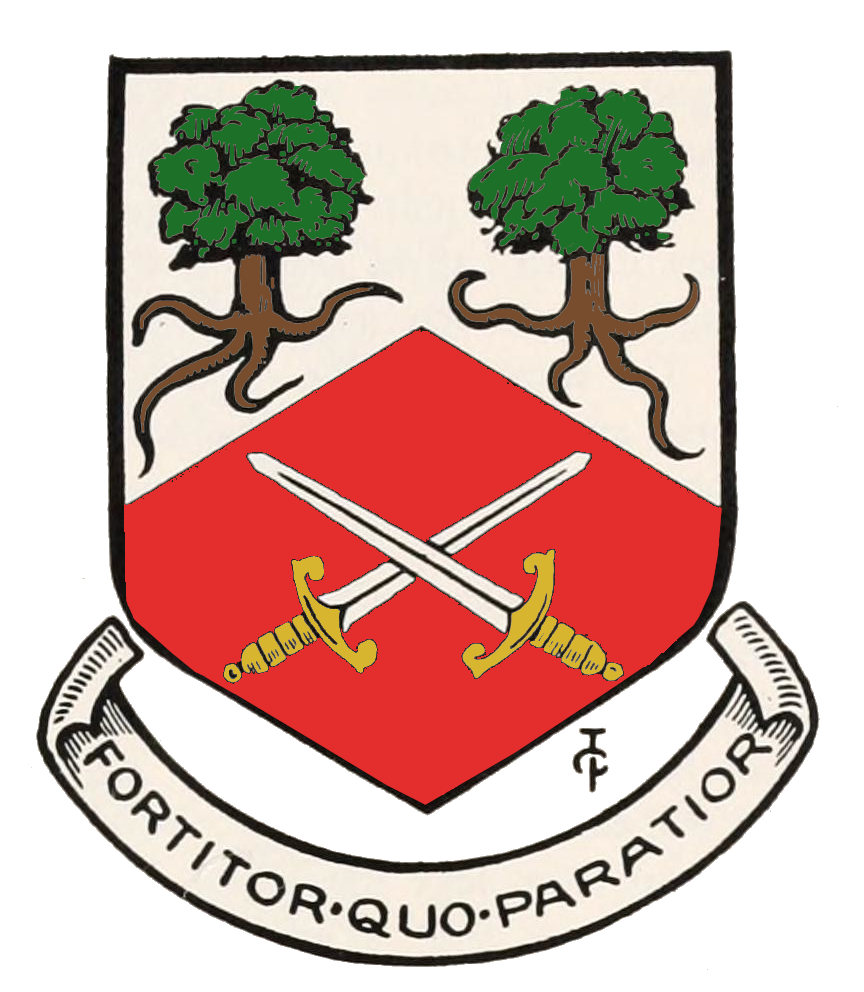
- Coat of arms of the borough council
- History
  - Established: 1867
- Contained within
  - County: Middlesex
  - Police force: Metropolitan Police District
- Subdivisions
  - Type: Wards
  - Units: Central Hornsey; Crouch End; Finsbury Park; Highgate; Muswell Hill; North Harringay; South Harringay; Stroud Green

The Municipal Borough of Hornsey was a local government district in east Middlesex from 1867 to 1965.

== History ==
In 1867, a Local Board was formed for part of the civil parish of Hornsey. The rest of the parish was already under South Hornsey Local Board, formed in 1865.

In 1894, under the Local Government Act of that year, Hornsey became an urban district. In November 1903, it was incorporated as a municipal borough. The corporation made two unsuccessful attempts to gain county borough status in 1904 and 1915. The borough was part of the London postal district and Metropolitan Police District.

The borough's coat of arms, granted in 1904, featured two oak trees recalling the ancient forest that once covered the area and surviving remnants including Queen's Wood, Highgate Wood and Coldfall Wood. The manor of Hornsey had at one time been held by the Diocese of London and crossed swords, taken from the Diocese's arms, completed the design. The borough's motto was Fortior quo paratior (Latin for 'The better prepared, the stronger').

One of the municipal borough's first significant projects was the opening of Hornsey Cottage Hospital in 1910. Hornsey Town Hall, built in 1933–35 and designed by Reginald Uren, was widely admired for its clean, Modernist style and beautiful detailing, symbolising enlightened local government. However, since 2004 Haringey Council gradually removed municipal services from the building, and its increasing dereliction caused a local furore.

In 1965, the municipal borough was abolished and its area was transferred to Greater London under the London Government Act 1963. Hornsey's area was combined with the Municipal Borough of Tottenham and the Municipal Borough of Wood Green to form the present-day London Borough of Haringey.
