= George Lethbridge =

British architect

- Born: 9 January 1848; Bickleigh, Devon, England
- Died: 26 February 1924 (aged 76); Highgate, London, England
- Resting place: Highgate Cemetery
- Spouse: Jessie Naismith Morton

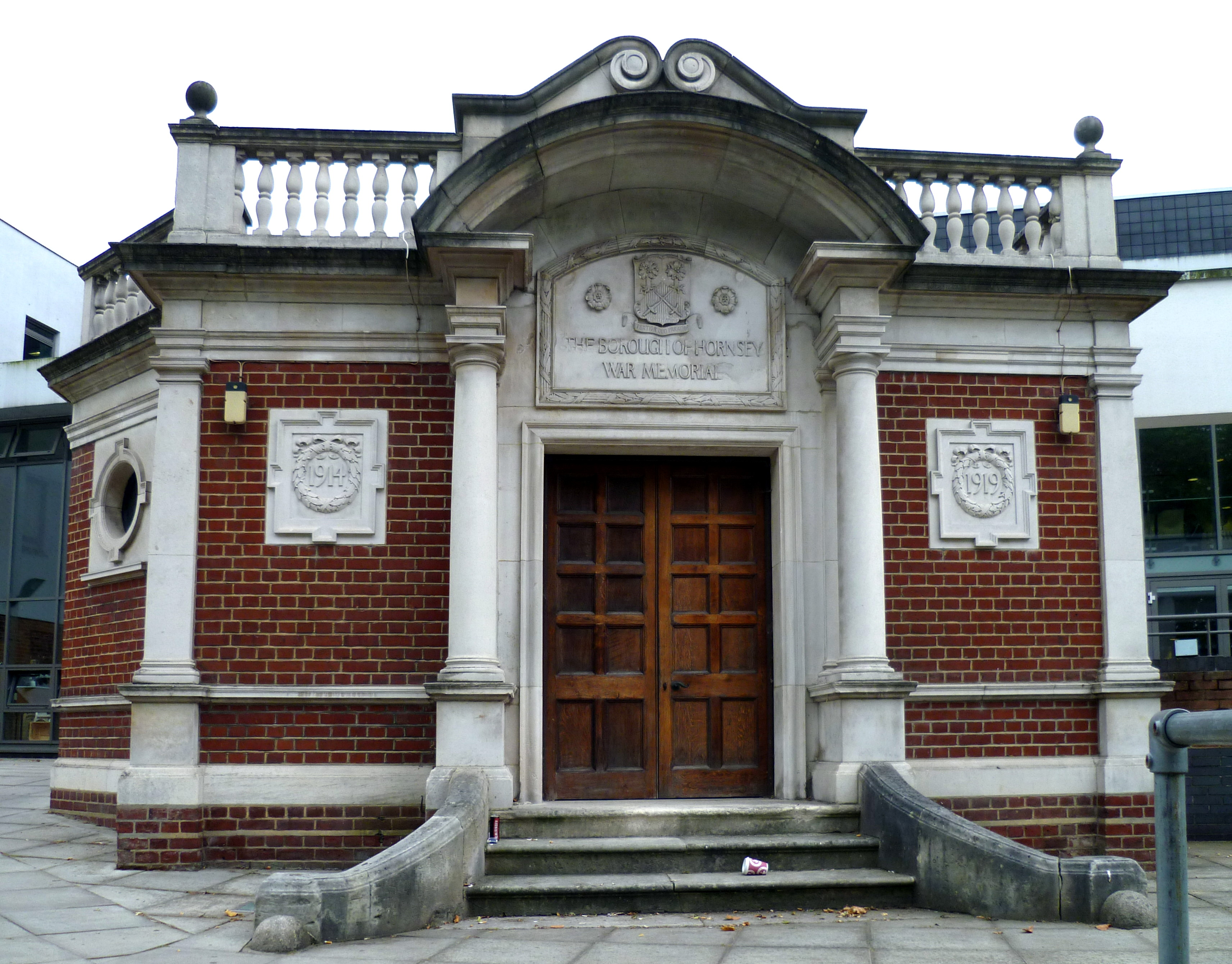
Hornsey War Memorial

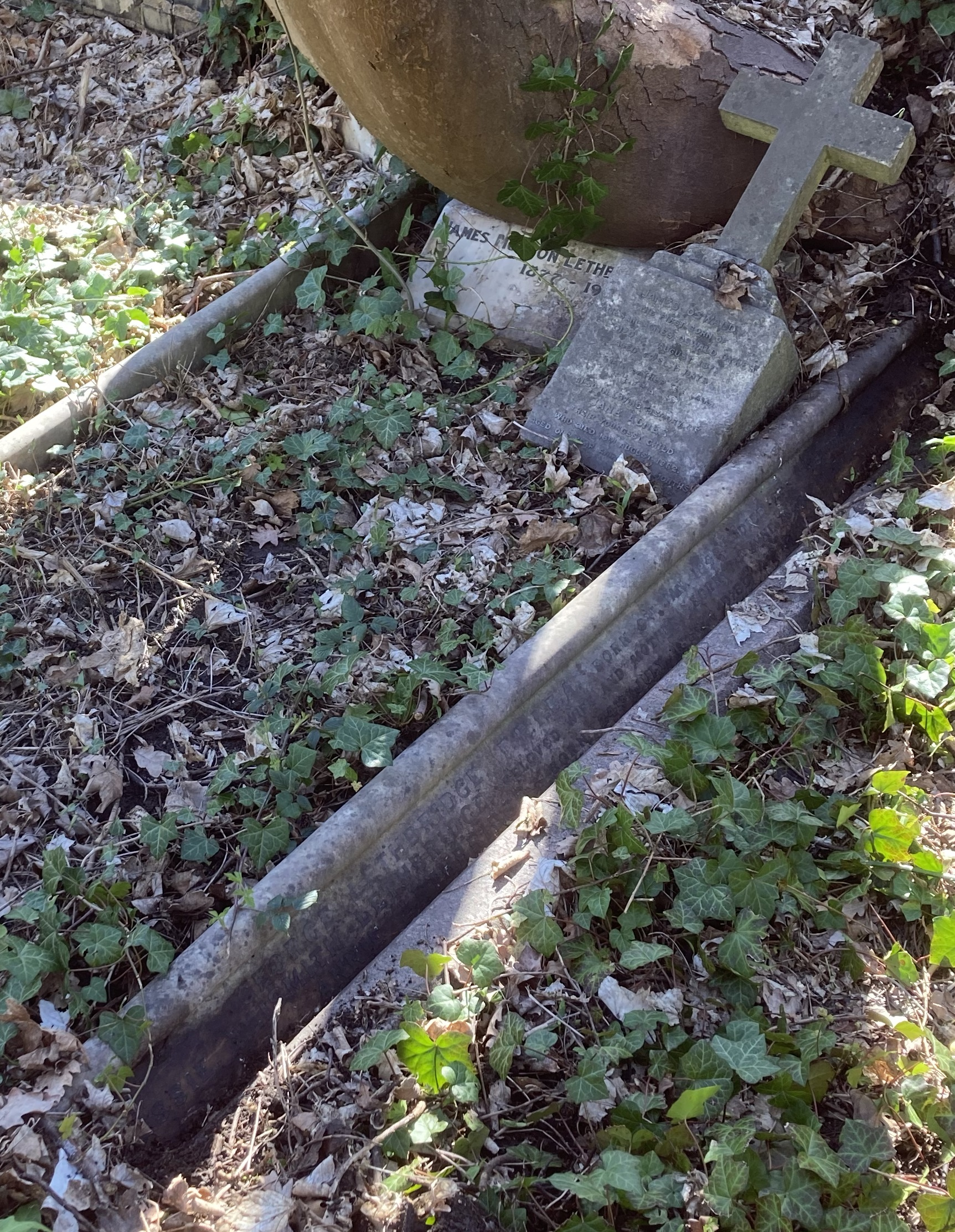
Family grave of George Lethbridge in Highgate Cemetery

George Lethbridge (9 January 1848 – 26 February 1924) was a British architect known for his war memorial designs.

== Family ==
Lethbridge was born on 9 January 1848 in Bickleigh, Devon, England. In 1874 he married Jessie Naismith Morton in Edinburgh and they had seven children, the third born was the architect James Morton Lethbridge. The family, who were Presbyterians, lived in Highgate, at 205 Archway Road.

== Career ==
He served his articles with William Henry Reid of Plymouth and commenced independent practice in London in 1870. Amongst Lethbridge's works were:

The Hornsey Central Hospital (now demolished).

The Hornsey War Memorial, now grade II listed by Historic England,

The Royal Russell School memorial Sundial.

Beauchene, Fitzjohns Avenue, Hampstead (1880)

== Death ==
George Lethbridge died aged 76, on 26 February 1924 in Highgate, and is buried in a family grave in Highgate Cemetery, with his wife and five of their children, including his architect son James. The grave is on the eastern side of the cemetery, close to the grave of the novelist George Eliot.
