= Nathaniel Wetherell =

British geologist and surgeon

Nathaniel Thomas Wetherell MRCS FGS (6 September 1800 – 22 December 1875) was a British geologist and surgeon. His work involved the collection of various fossils found in England. He was born, lived, and died in Highgate, England.

Wetherell discovered a strange mixture of rocks and fossils of northern provenance in Coldfall Wood, Muswell Hill in 1835. This led subsequently to the recognition that glaciation had affected southern England.

== Selected bibliography ==
- Wetherell N.T., 1852, Note on a new species of Clionites (With a Plate.), Annals and Magazine of Natural History 1852. Vol. 10 Jul.-Dec. No. LIX. (No. 59. November 1852.) XXXIII. p. 354.
- Wetherell N.T., 1859, On the Structure of some of the Siliceous Nodules of the Chalk, Quarterly Journal of the Geological Society 1859 vol 15 issue 1-2 p. 193.
- Wetherell N.T., 1859, On the occurrence of Graphularia Wetherellii in Nodules from the London Clay and the Crag, Quarterly Journal of the Geological Society 1859 vol 15: p. 30-32.
