= Coldfall Wood =

Ancient woodland in Muswell Hill, North London

Coordinates: 51°35′49″N 00°09′33″W

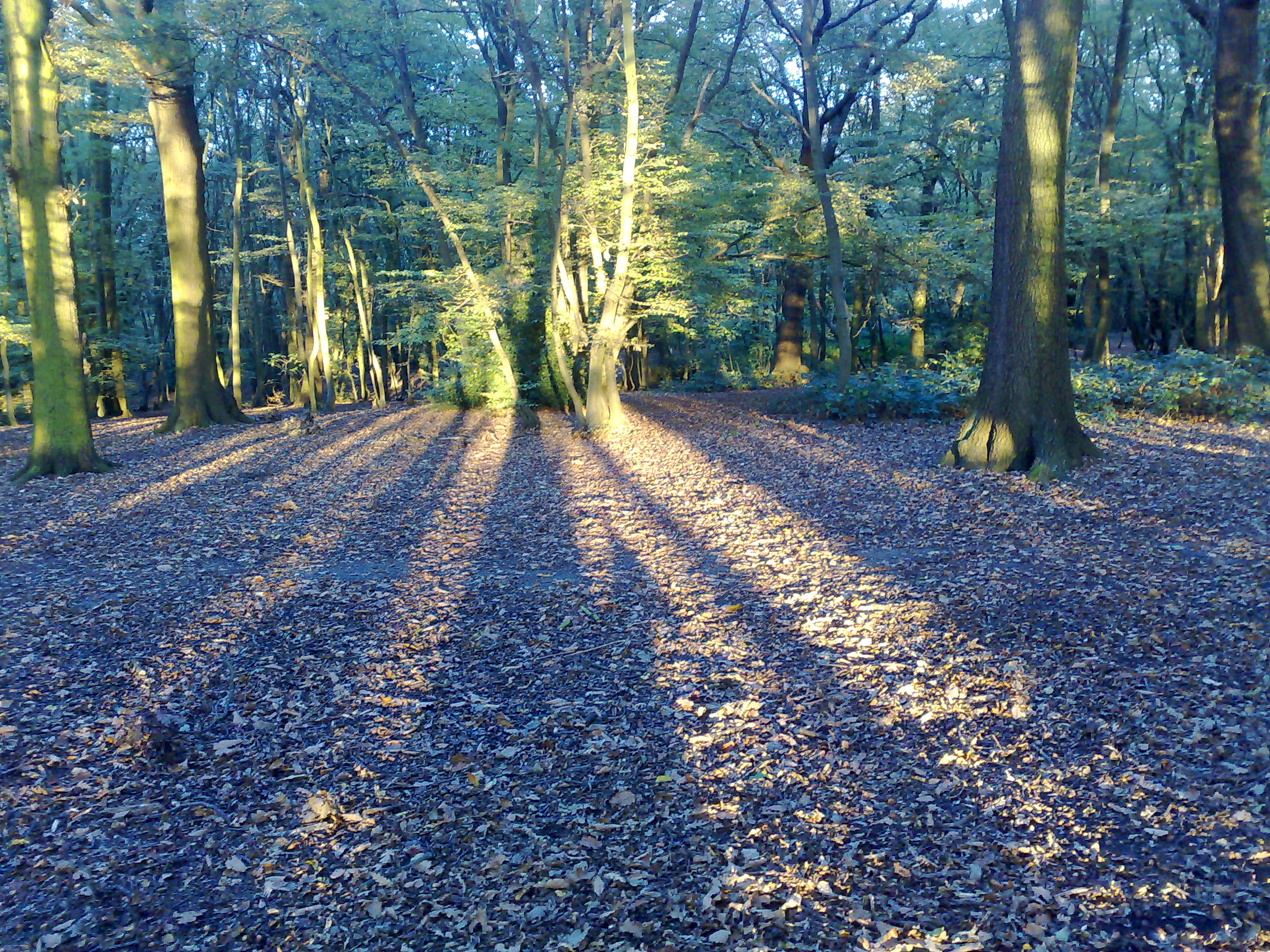
Shadows in Coldfall Wood

Coldfall Wood is an ancient woodland in Muswell Hill, North London. It covers an area of approximately 14 hectares (35 acres) and is surrounded by St Pancras and Islington Cemetery, the East Finchley public allotments, and the residential streets Creighton Avenue and Barrenger Road. It is the site of the discoveries which first led to the recognition that glaciation had once reached southern England. It was declared a local nature reserve in 2013, and is also a Site of Borough Importance for Nature Conservation, Grade 1.

== History ==
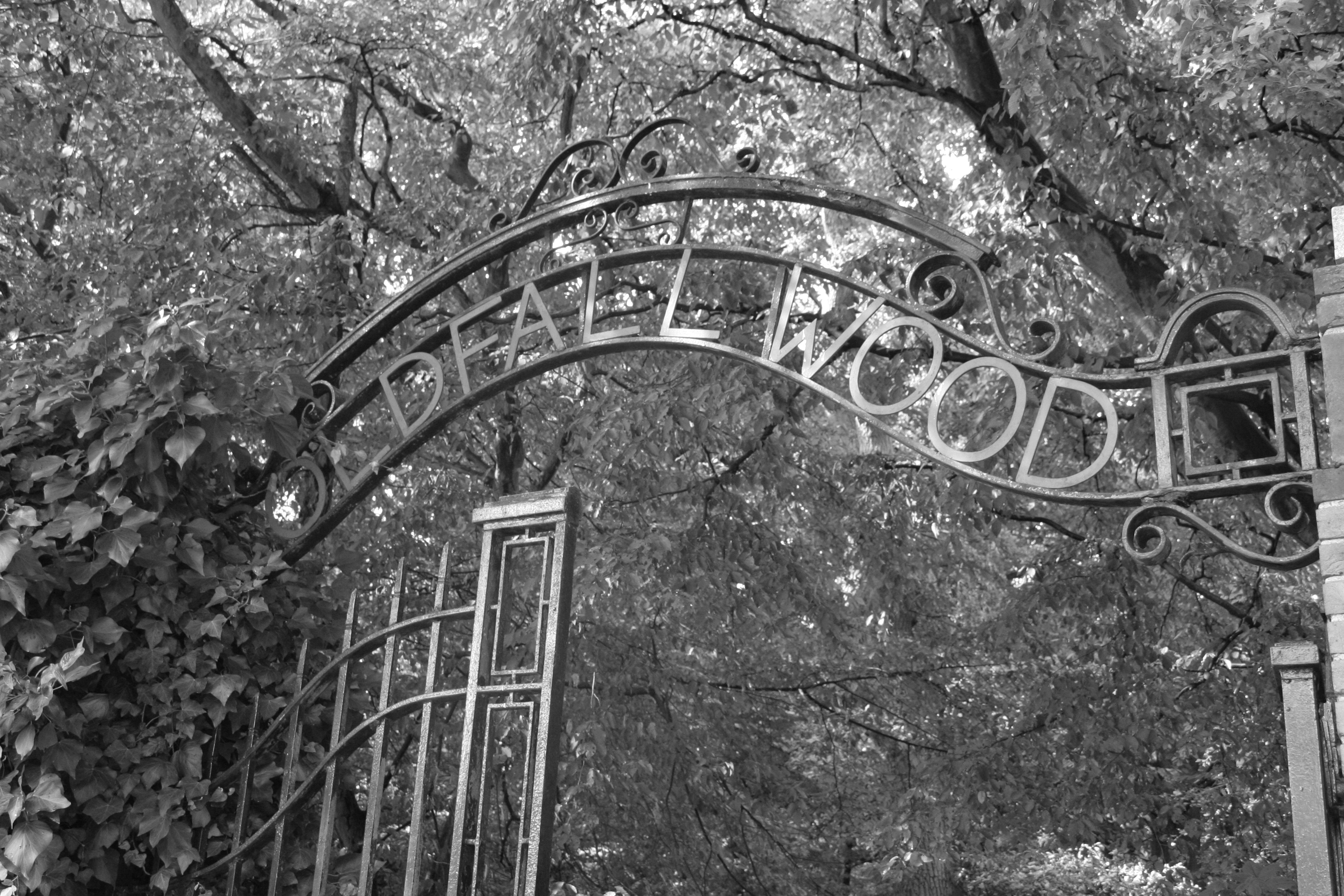
Southern entrance to Coldfall Wood

The London Borough of Haringey contains four ancient woods: Highgate Wood, Queen's Wood, Coldfall Wood, and Bluebell Wood. All are shown on John Rocque's 1754 Map of Middlesex.

Until the early 20th century Coldfall Wood was more than twice its current size, reaching south to the properties bordering Fortis Green. The southern section was felled and partially excavated for gravel, before being used for residential development and the sites of Tollington and William Grimshaw schools (later Fortismere School). Tollington first rented and felled part of the wood for a sports field in the 1920s and subsequently moved to a new building on the site. William Grimshaw was built later to the north.

Coldfall Wood was purchased in 1930 by Hornsey Council and the remaining section is now owned and managed by its successor, the London Borough of Haringey. It is bounded to the north by St Pancras and Islington Cemetery and Muswell Hill Sports Ground (formerly Finchley Common). Its western boundary is the boundary line between the London Boroughs of Barnet and Haringey. This western boundary and its northern boundaries are demarcated by the remains of an ancient woodbank with a ditch on the outer side. This would have prevented grazing animals from the surrounding Finchley Common and Horseshoe Farm (as they then were) from entering the wood and destroying the young coppice.

Coldfall Wood has been examined in some detail by Silvertown (1978), who used historical sources to show that the woodlands are likely to be of primary origin (i.e. continuously present since prehistoric times).

In March 2011, the Friends of Coldfall Wood launched an online interactive map that included historical maps of the area overlaid on a modern streetmap, showing how the wood has dwindled in size since 1864.

== Flora ==
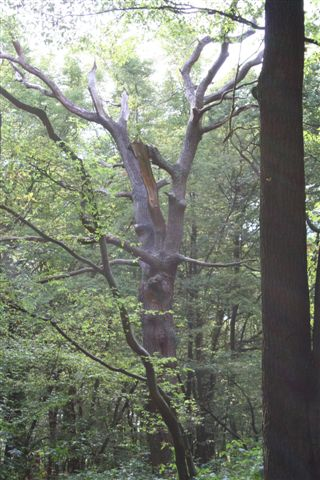
The absence of foliage on this blasted oak lets light through to the woodland floor.

Like the other local ancient woodlands in the area, the wood is dominated by oak standards, but the understorey is much less diverse and consists of almost pure stands of multi-stemmed, overgrown hornbeam coppice. Beech, hazel, mountain ash and wild service tree are all rare, though there are some fine specimens of the last species.

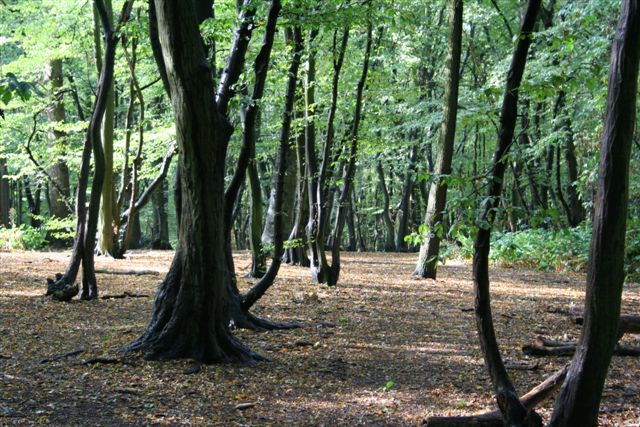
Hornbeam understorey

Little light penetrates to the woodland floor in the most wooded places and large areas of the wood are devoid of either shrub, field or ground layers of vegetation. Consequently, parts of the wood can present a dark and gloomy appearance in the summer months. Nevertheless, in the few glade areas, caused by the collapse of an occasional canopy tree, or by more recent coppicing, the flora is of considerable interest. Pill sedge hangs on in its only known Haringey site, and tiny populations of cow-wheat, slender St John's wort, wood anemone, and heath speedwell manage to survive, though they seldom flower.

An area of approximately one acre was cut in the north-western corner of the wood in December 1990 with the assistance of the British Trust for Conservation Volunteers, the Friends of Coldfall Wood, and the Haringey Branch of the London Wildlife Trust. The felled hornbeam poles were cut, stacked on site, and allowed to decay in situ to provide deadwood habitat for the benefit of invertebrates and fungi. Brushwood was used to construct a dead hedge around the coppice. This has protected the area from trampling, both by dogs and humans, and will hopefully provide a nesting habitat for wrens and other woodland birds. Regrowth from the cut hornbeam stools has been encouraging with a maximum growth of two metres being recorded by the end of 1991.

The vegetational succession following the coppice is being carefully monitored by means of permanent quadrats. In the first year after coppicing, more than seventy species of flowering plant have been recorded here – a gratifying increase from the original flora of a mere six species. The newcomers include heath groundsel, which is unknown elsewhere in the Borough, suggesting the possibility that its seed may have lain dormant in the soil since the last coppice was cut before the Second World War. Ring counts of the coppice poles suggest that this was done about sixty years ago. The majority of new plants, however, will have colonised from outside and many of the arrivals are widespread ruderal species typical of disturbed open habitats, such as mugwort, sow-thistles and willowherbs. Rosebay willowherb dominates much of the area. A hundred years ago this was a rare plant in southern England and it was recorded from Coldfall Wood as early as 1901 (Kent 1975). The appearance of Sumatran fleabane was not entirely unexpected, for it has spread rapidly throughout Haringey since first being recorded from the Borough in 1985 (Wurzell 1988). It is also present in North Wood. There can be few other ancient woods in Britain that include this subtropical species in their flora.

== Geology ==
The wood lies on the northern margin of the glacial ridge that forms Muswell Hill. The surviving section of the wood lies on London Clay overlain by head. To the immediate west and south this is overlain by gravels of a former course of the Thames, capped by glacial till of Anglian age. It was here in 1835 that N. T. Wetherell discovered a strange mixture of rocks and fossils normally found in the north of England that led to the subsequent recognition of glacial deposits in southern England.

== Improvements ==
Coldfall Wood was selected as one of six "Flagship Woods" in the whole of London, to be included as part of the "Capital Woodlands Project" application to the Heritage Lottery Fund (HLF) which was prepared by a range of partners, including the Greater London Authority, the Forestry Commission, and several London Boroughs including Haringey. The bid was taken forward by Trees for Cities.

The improvement programme consisted of the following projects, completed over a three-year period.

1. Coppicing commenced in November 2006, and resulted in an increase of ferns and flowering plants from 48 to 156 species a year later.
2. Four new bridges were added.
3. Two new reed beds were created.
4. Sloping tarmac paths were added to improve access through the various entry gates, as well as welcome boards, notice boards, and interpretation panels.

== See also ==
- Coppetts Wood and Scrublands
