= Forest of Middlesex =

Historical forest in England

The Forest of Middlesex was an area covering much of the county of Middlesex, England, that was north of the City of London and now forms the northern part of Greater London. The area was under Forest Law, and much of it was wooded.

At its ancient extent the forest stretched twelve miles north from the city walls at Houndsditch. Following the Norman Conquest it became the royal forest of Middlesex, where citizens of the City of London enjoyed the right of free chase by charters granted by Henry I and Henry II.

William Fitzstephen, who died circa 1190, described it as "vast forest, its copses dense with foliage concealing wild animals – stags, does, boars, and wild bulls." After the area was disafforested in 1218 by Henry III, ceasing to be a royal forest, the land passed into private ownership. This led to the deforestation of the bulk of the forest and its opening for development and agriculture.

The boundaries of the Forest are not clear, but Domesday returns for Middlesex as a whole indicate the county was around 30% wooded (much of it wood-pasture) in 1086, about double the English average. This would have been lower in the lower land, close to rivers that made it more attractive for farming, and higher elsewhere. The proportion of woodland in England decreased sharply between the Conquest and the Black Death due to the pressure of a rapidly increasing population, and the same pressures would have been experienced here. Much of the loss of woodland in Middlesex appears due to wood-pasture being downgraded to heathland as a result of intensive grazing.

Remaining fragments of the ancient forest include Harrow Weald Common, Highgate Wood, Queen's Wood and Scratchwood. The London neighbourhood of St John's Wood reflects that part of the forest later owned by the Order of St John of Jerusalem.
