= Vincients Wood =

Nature reserve in Wiltshire, England

Coordinates: 51.459°N 2.149°W

- Location within Wiltshire
- OS grid reference: ST897733
- Unitary authority: Wiltshire
- Ceremonial county: Wiltshire
- Region: South West
- Country: England
- Sovereign state: United Kingdom
- Police: Wiltshire
- Fire: Dorset and Wiltshire
- Ambulance: South Western

Vincients Wood is a small nature reserve, a 12 acres (5 ha) area of semi-natural broadleaved woodland on the western edge of the town of Chippenham, Wiltshire, England.

On the west side of Vincients Wood is a small grass strip and then the A350 bypass; other than that the wood is surrounded by housing. The Moss Mead housing estate is on the north side, past a long, narrow strip of grass named the Long Dragon Piece and some willow pollards; to the east are Awdry Close and Brinkworth Close, and to the south are Turpin Way and Brittain Close.

The hazel bushes that grow beneath the oaks were regularly cut in the past, a tradition known as coppicing. The cut wood was used for building fences and provided fuel. Periodic removal of selected trees creates sunny glades. Combined with the coppicing, this benefits wildlife by letting the sunlight in and creating ideal conditions for many animals, birds, insects and plants.

Vincients Wood is divided into two unequal parts by a medieval woodbank and ditch stretching its entire width. The southern section of the wood is older than the larger northern section – so much so that it is considered to be ancient woodland. The wood is maintained by the Wiltshire Wildlife Trust, who have owned it since 1990 and manage the reserve along with volunteers. A footpath through the wood circles most of the reserve for approximately one mile, and there are multiple entrances and exits into the wood. A welcome sign, created by the Trust in conjunction with the Countryside Commission (now the Countryside Agency), is posted at the north-by-northwest entrance and states that a Nature Trail leaflet is available. Due to Hymenoscyphus fraxineus, a fungal disease that affected much of the wood - particularly ash trees, work has been done since 2023 to remove infected trees and to reduce risk of spread, sometimes restricting public access.

The woodland is a reserve intended to protect many species of wildlife, plants and fungi. Visitors are encouraged to keep to the main paths, not to drop litter, and leave the flowers for others to enjoy.

== Common biota in Vincients Wood ==
=== Fauna ===
- Grey squirrel
- Hedgehog
- Great spotted woodpecker
- Chiffchaff
- Wren
- Bullfinch
- Blackcap
- Nuthatch
- Goldcrest
- Tit
- Speckled wood
- Red fox

=== Flora ===
- Ash
- Maple
- Oak
- Crab apple
- Aspen
- English elm
- Sallow
- Horse chestnut
- Larch
- Hazel
- Spindle
- Hawthorn
- Guelder rose
- Wayfaring tree
- Blackthorn
- Dogwood
- Dog violet
- Privet
- Wood anemone
- White wood anemone
- Common bluebell
- Early purple orchid
- Buttercup
- Goldilocks buttercup
- Lesser celandine
- Red campion
- Stitchwort
- Woodruff
- Honeysuckle
- Ivy
- Ground ivy

=== Fungi ===
- Blewit
- Wood blewit
- Crumble cap
- Fairies bonnets
