= Queen's Wood =

Ancient woodland in north London, England

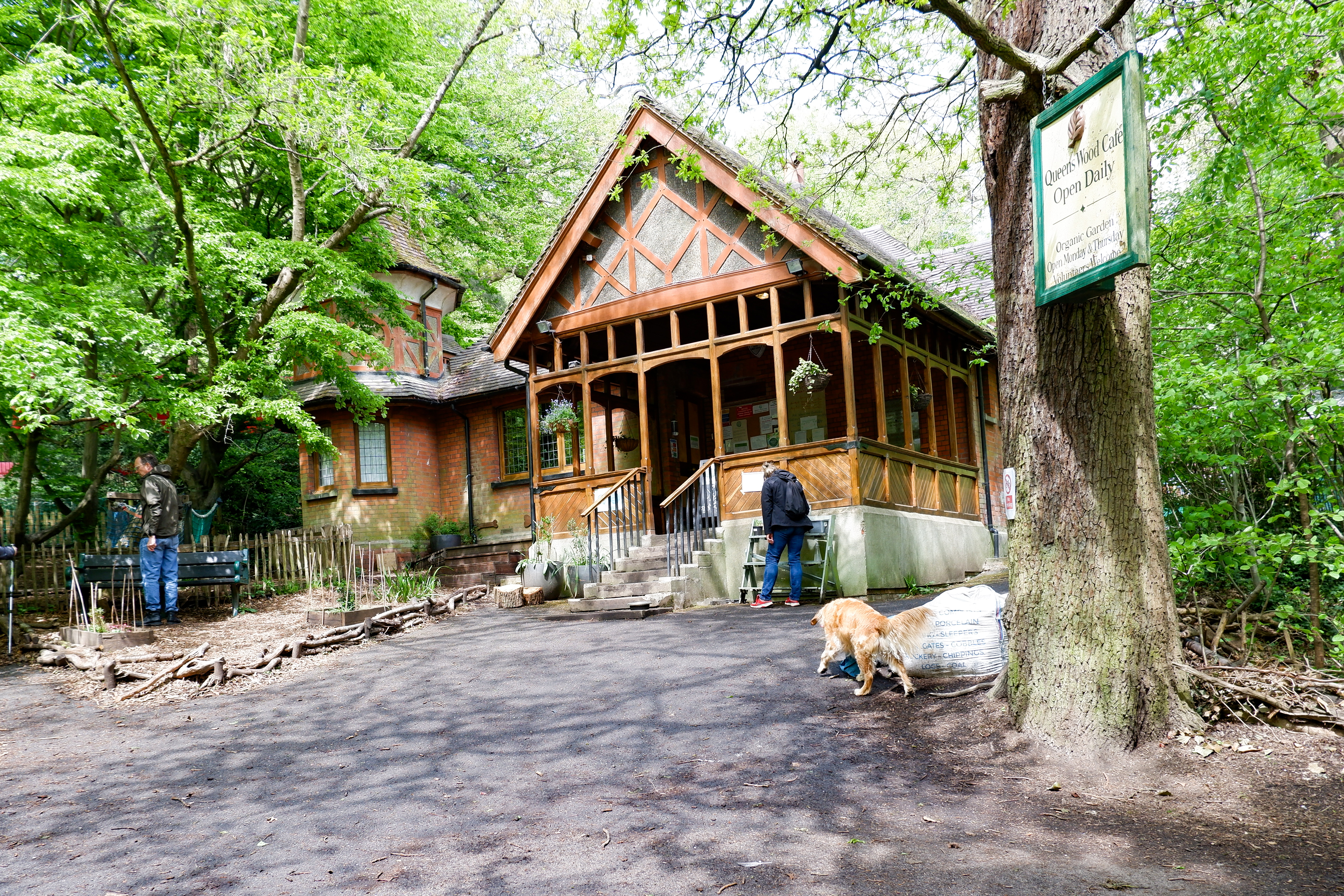
- The Queen's Wood Café
- Interactive map of Queen's Wood
- Type: Local Nature Reserve, Woodland
- Location: Muswell Hill, London Borough of Haringey, England
- Coordinates: 51.582°N 0.143°W
- Area: 53.4 acres (21.6 ha)
- Opened: 1898 (as public park)
- Operator: London Borough of Haringey
- Open: 24 hours
- Status: Open

Queen's Wood is a 53.4-acre (22 ha) area of ancient woodland in the London Borough of Haringey, England. It borders on Highgate Wood and lies between East Finchley, Highgate, Muswell Hill and Crouch End. It was originally part of the ancient Forest of Middlesex, which covered much of London, Hertfordshire and Essex, and was mentioned in the Domesday Book. It is now one of three Local Nature Reserves in the borough and lies a few minutes' walk from Highgate tube station.

== History ==
The borough of Haringey contains four ancient woods: Queen's, Highgate, Coldfall and Bluebell; all are shown on John Rocque's 1754 Map of Middlesex.

Queen's Wood was once called Churchyard Bottom Wood and was originally part of the Great Forest of Middlesex. It was said to be the site of a plague pit during the Great Plague of London; however, evidence suggests, if there was a plague pit, it was just outside the current boundaries. In 1898, it was purchased from the Ecclesiastical Commissioners by Hornsey Urban District Council, opened to the public by Princess Helena, Duchess of Albany, and renamed in honour of Queen Victoria.

== Description ==
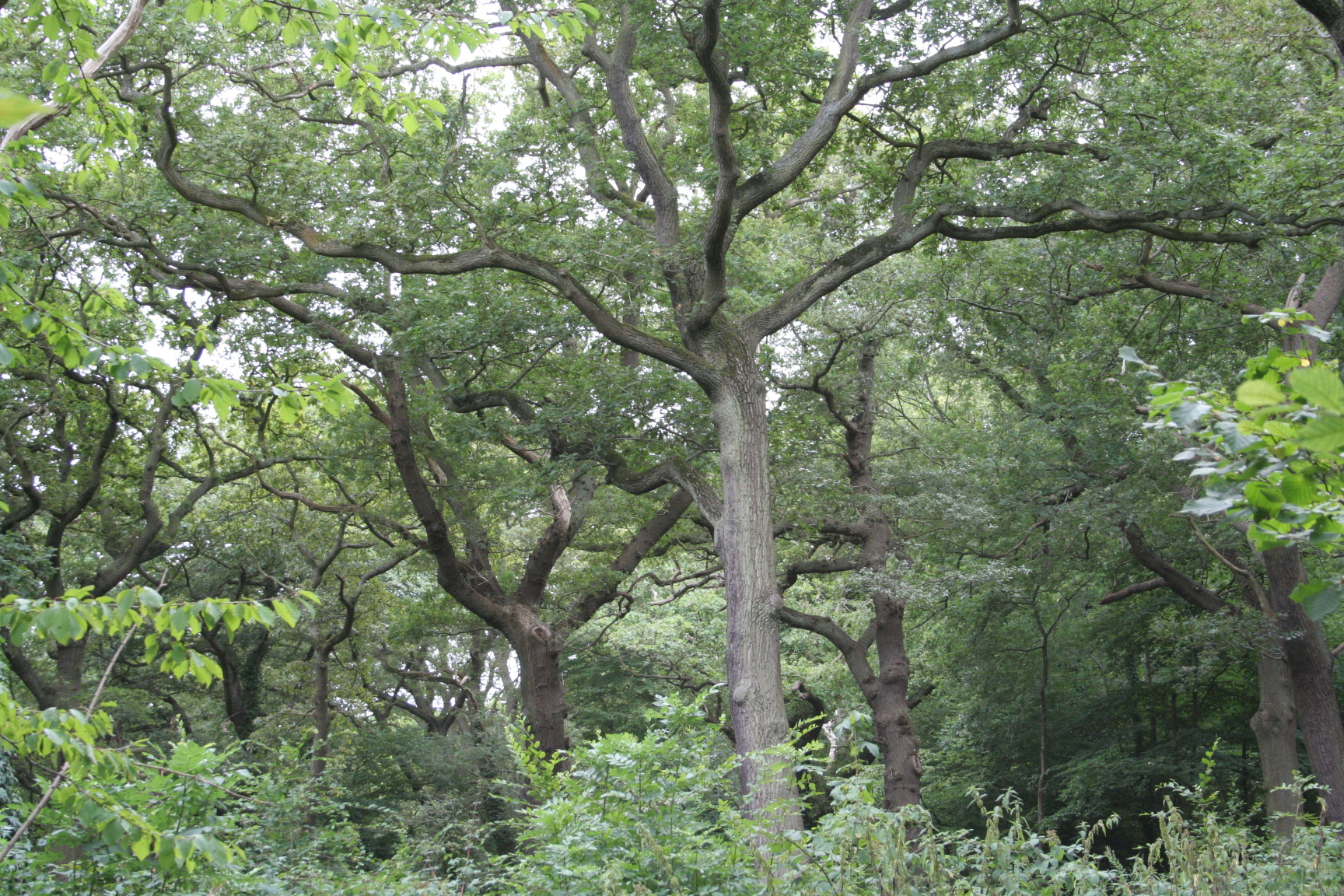
The wood in mid-2006

The wood is an ancient oak-hornbeam woodland, which features English oak and occasional beech which provide a canopy above cherry, field maple, hazel, holly, hornbeam, midland hawthorn, mountain ash and both species of lowland birch. The scarce Wild Service Tree is scattered throughout the wood, which is evidence of its ancient origin.

It has a small adventure playground, but no park or playing fields, and has never been subjected to intensive management of the type practised at Highgate Wood; accordingly, there is greater diversity of flora and fauna. Bantock (1984) found a significantly greater number of ground feeding birds present when compared to Highgate Wood, which he attributed to the greater structural diversity and denser shrub layer present. Queen's Wood is a Local Nature Reserve and a Site of Metropolitan Importance for Nature Conservation.

The ground flora is particularly rich given its proximity to central London. (Note: The wood lies within a six-mile radius of Charing Cross.) It includes a large population of wood anemone, goldilocks buttercup, wood sorrel, yellow pimpernel and square-stemmed St John's wort. A survey conducted in 1984 noted 39 distinct herbaceous species, 15 different grasses native to the wood, and 23 species of tree and shrub.

A small paddling pool, which had fallen into disuse, has been converted into a pond with wild aquatic plants; this was with the assistance of the Friends of Queen's Wood Society.

Despite fairly high levels of disturbance, the bird life is diverse; it includes breeding pairs of at least 27 species, such as the endangered song thrush and two species of woodpecker. Over a hundred species of spiders have been spotted and a nationally rare jewel beetle is widespread.

The park is also the source of the Moselle, a stream that runs across parts of north London on its way, via Pymmes Brook, to the river Lea in Tottenham.
