= Hornsey Town Hall =

Municipal building in London, England

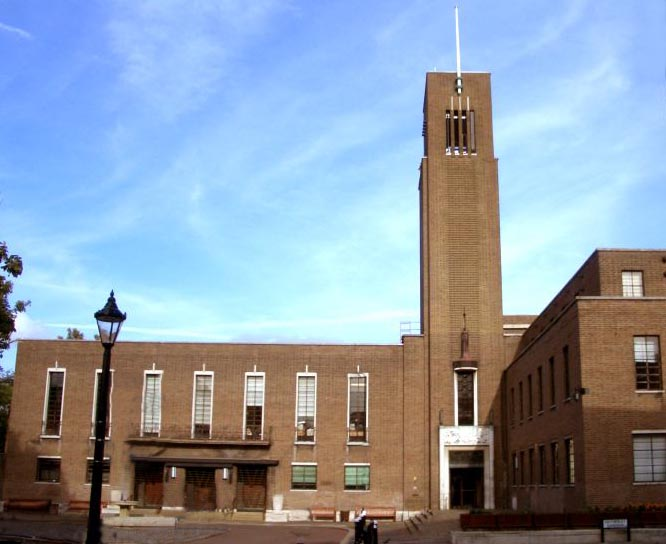
- Hornsey Town Hall

- Shown in Haringey
- 51.5788°N 0.1223°W
- Location: Hornsey

History
- Built: 1935

Site notes
- Architect: Reginald Uren
- Architectural style: Modernist style

Listed Building – Grade II*
- Designated: 16 January 1981
- Reference no.: 1263688

Hornsey Town Hall is a public building in Hatherley Gardens in the Crouch End area of Hornsey, London. The building was used by the Municipal Borough of Hornsey as its headquarters until 1965. It is a Grade II* listed building.

== History ==
=== Early history ===
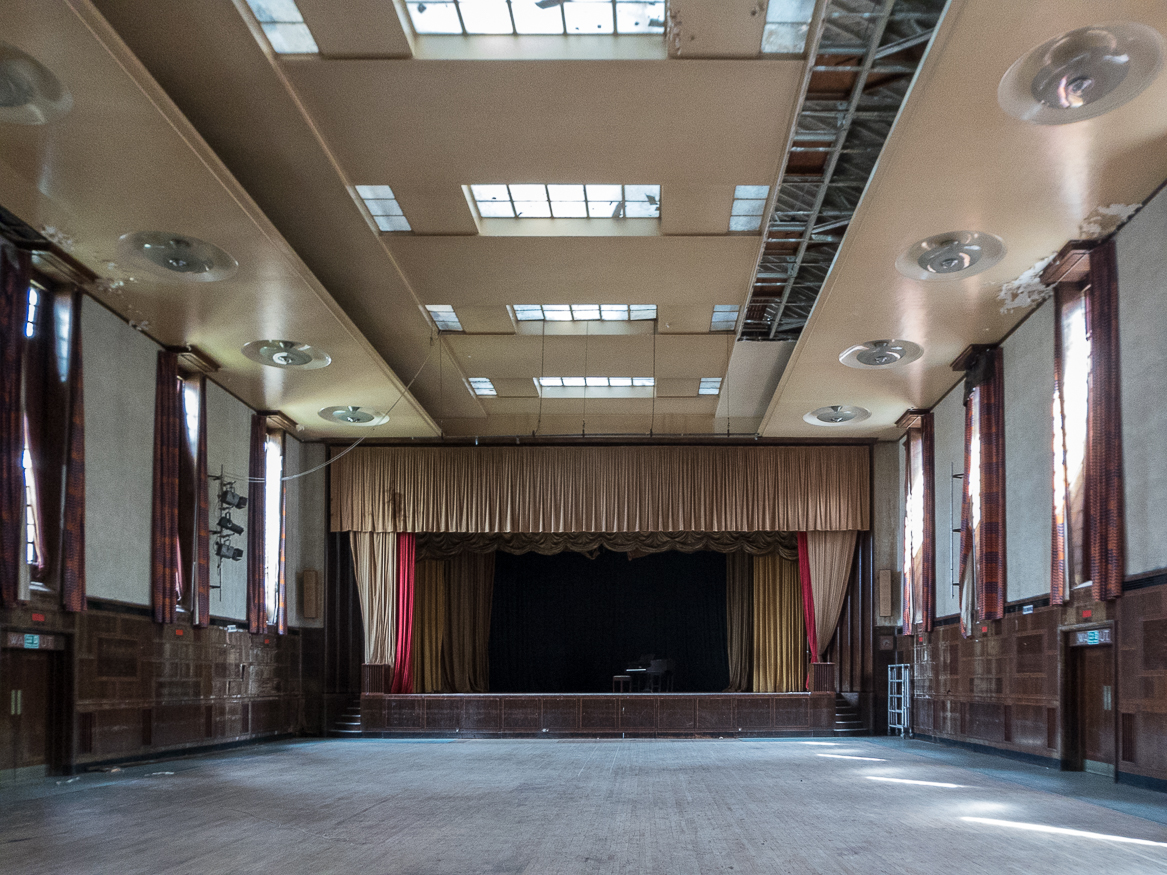
View inside the main hall

In the late 19th century, the local board of health had used offices in Southwood Lane in Highgate, which had been specially built for them in May 1869. After Hornsey had become an urban district in 1894 and then been incorporated as a municipal borough in 1903, civic leaders decided this arrangement was inadequate for their needs and that they would procure a purpose-built town hall. The site selected for the new facility in Broadway had previously been occupied by properties known as Broadway Hall and Lake Villa.

The foundation stone was laid by the mayor, Councillor William Grimshaw, on 29 November 1934. Hornsey Town Hall was the first major UK building to be constructed in the Modernist style. Designed by New Zealand-born architect Reginald Uren for the Municipal Borough of Hornsey, the building shows the influence of Hilversum Town Hall in the Netherlands and the design was awarded a bronze medal by the Royal Institute of British Architects. It was built by Gee, Walker & Slater Ltd and opened by the Duke and Duchess of Kent on 4 November 1935.

The design involved a symmetrical main frontage with seven bays facing onto a small courtyard in Hatherley Gardens with a wing of six bays enclosing the courtyard to the right; the main frontage featured wide steps leading up to three doorways with a canopy above on the ground floor; there were seven tall windows on the first floor with a wrought-iron balcony in front of the central three windows. A tall tower with a flag pole was erected at the corner of the courtyard. Internally, the principal rooms were the council chamber, the mayor's parlour and the committee room.

The building continued to be the headquarters of the Municipal Borough of Hornsey for much of the 20th century but ceased to be the local seat of government when the London Borough of Haringey was formed in 1965. The town hall was used instead for concerts and even hosted the singer, Freddie Mercury, in February 1971. In 1981, it became one of the first of the buildings constructed in the 1930s to achieve listed building status.

=== Redevelopment ===
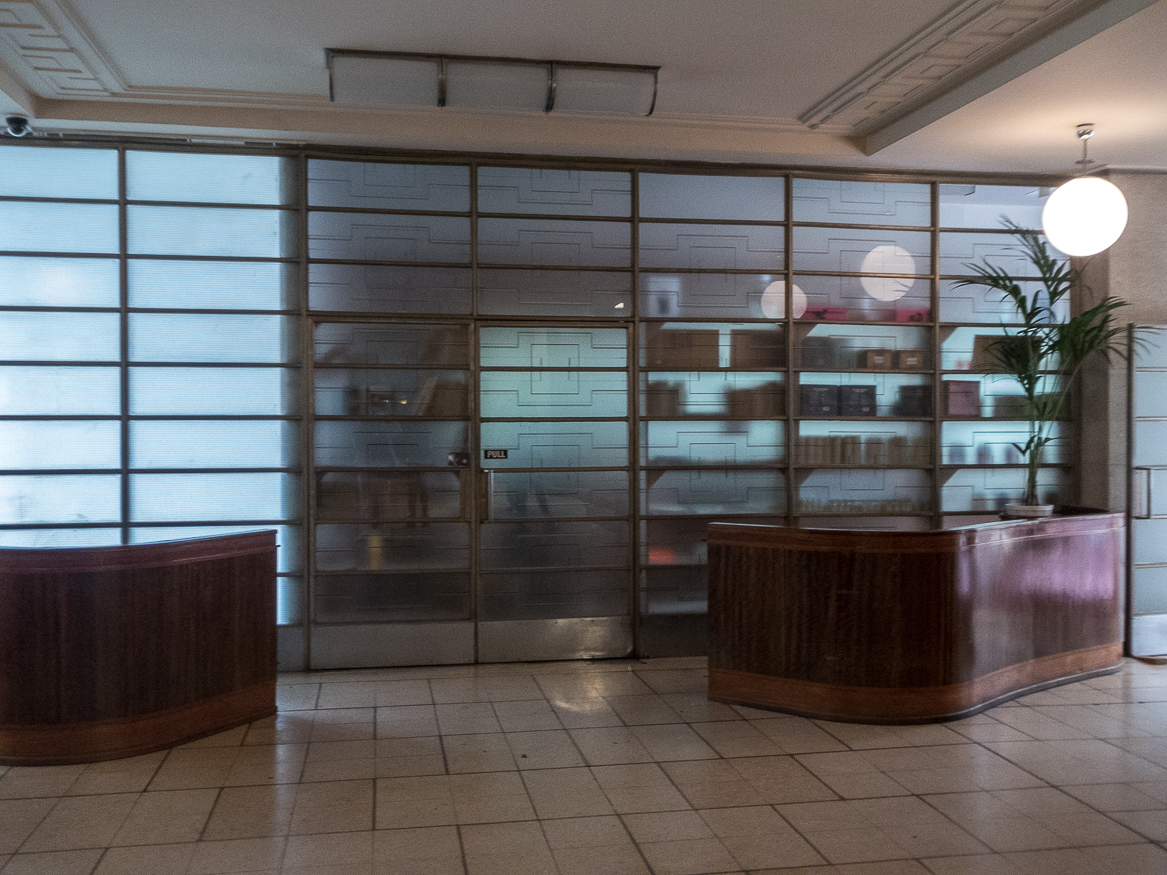
Another view inside the building

After deciding that the town hall was surplus to requirements, the London Borough of Haringey commissioned a generic redevelopment scheme to renovate the town hall and build flats behind it, securing planning permission for that scheme in 2010.

In 2011, the London Borough of Haringey agreed to lease the town hall to Mountview Academy of Theatre Arts on a 125-year lease. Early feasibility studies indicated that the cost of renovating and converting the Grade II* listed building would be £19 million. In June 2012, Mountview was awarded £500,000 by the Heritage Lottery Fund for initial development work, a sum which was matched with a further £500,000 from Mountview's own reserves. Following a tender procurement process advertised in the Official Journal of the European Union, Mountview appointed architects Purcell to develop plans for the site to include publicly accessible theatres, acting and dance studios, production arts workshops and student welfare facilities.

However, an independent review carried out in 2015 revealed that the cost of developing the site would be greater than originally anticipated and beyond the combined affordability of Haringey Council and Mountview. Mountview committed to finding an alternative site for its new home, but after a suitable site could not be identified in Haringey, Mountview announced a partnership with Southwark London Borough Council to create a new purpose-built home on a town centre site in Peckham in south London.

In November 2015, the London Borough of Haringey offered the town hall on a 125-year lease to anyone who would take on responsibility to develop residential accommodation on the site and allocate some of the proceeds to restoring the building.

A group of local people formed themselves into the Hornsey Town Hall Appreciation Society in the hope of taking the town hall into community ownership and secured 2,501 signatures on a petition to achieve that objective. However, the London Borough of Haringey felt unable to sell the property at an undervalue and invited the Hornsey Town Hall Appreciation Society to participate in a commercial bid being organised by an alliance of local community groups known as the Hornsey Town Hall Community Interest Company. The venture was not successful and the Hornsey Town Hall Community Interest Company was dissolved on 6 November 2018.

In October 2019, the Far East International Consortium, a developer selected by Haringey Council, began restoration works on the building. The restoration work, which was carried out to a design by Donald Insall Associates, involved reupholstered leather seating in the council chamber and repairs to the signage, metal balustrading, parquet flooring and terrazzo flooring.

In February 2023, it was announced that the building will reopen in spring 2025 as the Dao by Dorsett Hornsey Town Hall Hotel. The property opened in November 2025 as Dao by Dorsett North London with 68 serviced apartments.

== Use as film and TV location ==
The modernist style and Art Deco interior of the Town Hall has proved popular as a location for film and TV productions. This includes:

- regular appearances as the police station in the 2009 gothic crime drama Whitechapel,
- the 2011 BBC drama series The Hour
- the British TV drama series Killing Eve (in which it represented a grand Moscow hotel).
