= Hornsey War Memorial =

War memorial in London

Coordinates: 51.5842°N 0.1311°W

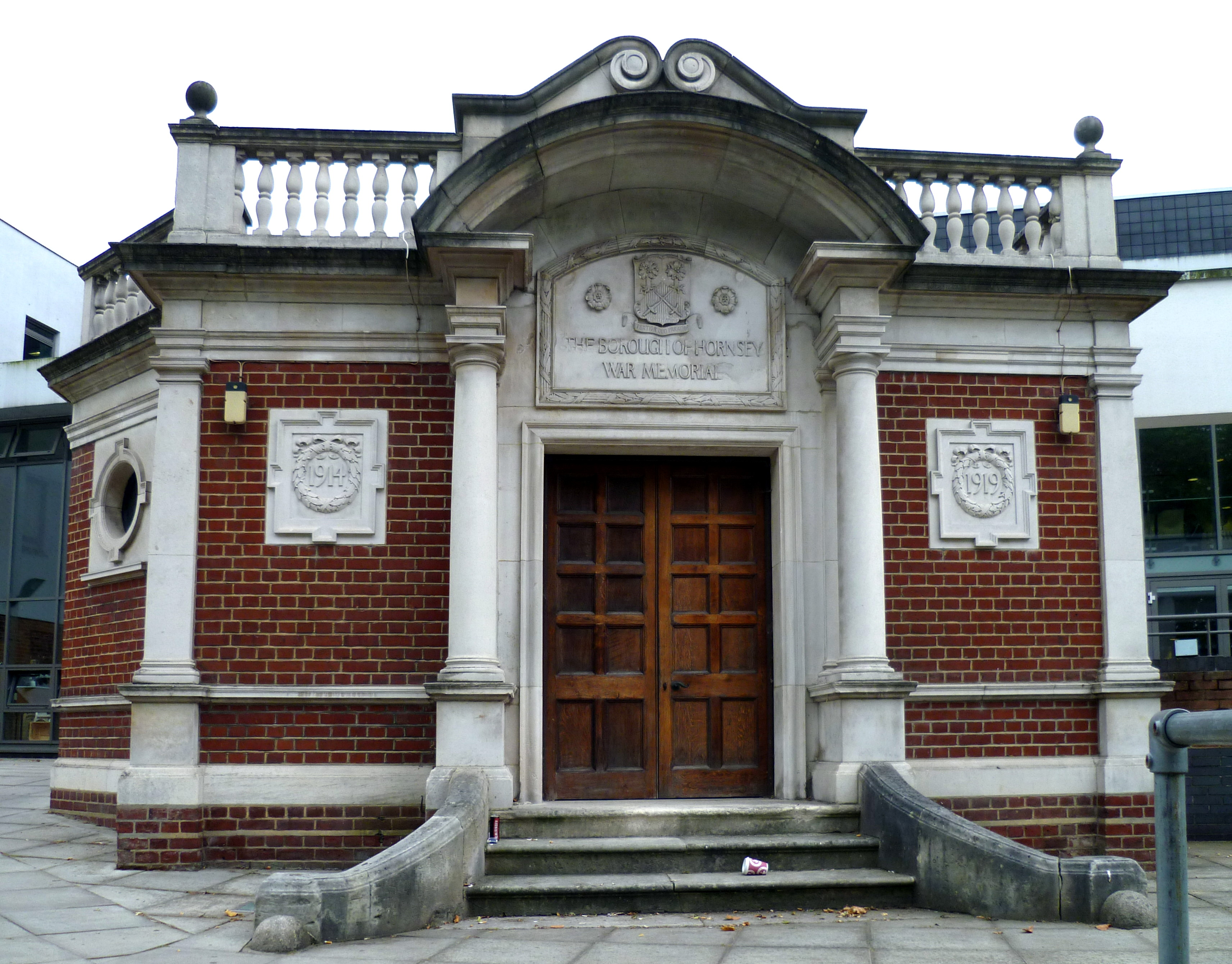
Hornsey War Memorial

Hornsey War Memorial is located in Park Road, Hornsey, in London, in front of the Hornsey Central Neighbourhood Health Centre, formerly the Hornsey Central Hospital, formerly the Hornsey Memorial Hospital. The address in 2023 is 151 Park Rd, London N8 8JD.

The memorial commemorates the men of the borough who died in the First World War and is in the form of a small red-brick chapel with Portland stone dressings. It was designed by George Lethbridge and dedicated in 1921. The names of the dead are inscribed on plaques inside the chapel. The chapel was renovated in 2007–09 when the old hospital was demolished and a new one built in its place. It is grade II listed with Historic England.

Adjacent to the chapel is a small grassed area with stone benches and a modern V-shaped memorial wall into which the original plaques relating to the erection of the memorial have been set.
