= London Borough of Haringey =

Borough in north London, England

- London borough
- Flag Coat of arms Council logo
- Motto: Progress with Humanity
- Haringey shown within Greater London
- Coordinates: 51.601632°N 0.112915°W
- Sovereign state: United Kingdom
- Constituent country: England
- Region: London
- Ceremonial county: Greater London
- Created: 1 April 1965
- Admin HQ: Wood Green

Government
  - Type: London borough council
  - Body: Haringey London Borough Council
  - London Assembly: Joanne McCartney (Labour) AM for Enfield and Haringey
  - MPs: Catherine West (Labour), David Lammy (Labour), Bambos Charalambous (Labour)

Area
  - Total: 11.42 sq mi (29.59 km^{2})
  - Rank: 281st (of 296)

Population (2025)
  - Total: 266,218
  - Rank: 72nd (of 296)
  - Density: 23,300/sq mi (8,997/km^{2})
- Time zone: UTC (GMT)
  - Summer (DST): UTC+1 (BST)
- Postcodes: N
- Area code: 020
- ISO 3166 code: GB-HRY
- ONS code: 00AP
- GSS code: E09000014
- Police: Metropolitan Police
- Website: www.haringey.gov.uk

The London Borough of Haringey (/ˈhærɪŋɡeɪ/ HARR-ing-gay, same as Harringay) (Note: Pupils in local schools at the time the borough was created in 1965 were taught that the new borough's name should be pronounced with the ending sounded as in the endings of Finchley, Hackney or Hornsey - Valerie Crosby, Archivist, Bruce Castle Archives, London Borough of Haringey, 2007.) is a London borough in north London, England. It is classified by some definitions as part of Inner London and by others as part of Outer London. It was created in 1965 by the amalgamation of three former boroughs. It shares borders with six other London boroughs; clockwise from the north, they are: Enfield, Waltham Forest, Hackney, Islington, Camden and Barnet.

Haringey covers an area of more than 11 sq mi (28.5 km^{2}). Some of the more familiar local landmarks include Alexandra Palace, Bruce Castle, Hornsey Town Hall, Jacksons Lane, Highpoint I and II, and Tottenham Hotspur Football Club. The borough has extreme contrasts: areas in the west, such as Highgate, Muswell Hill and Crouch End are among the most prosperous in the country; in the east of the borough, such as in Tottenham and Wood Green, some wards are classified as being among the most deprived 10% in the country. Haringey is also a borough of contrasts geographically. From the wooded high ground around Highgate and Muswell Hill at 426.5 feet (130.0 m), the land falls sharply away to the flat, open low-lying land beside the river Lea in the east. The borough includes large areas of green space, which make up more than 25% of its total area.

== Toponymy ==
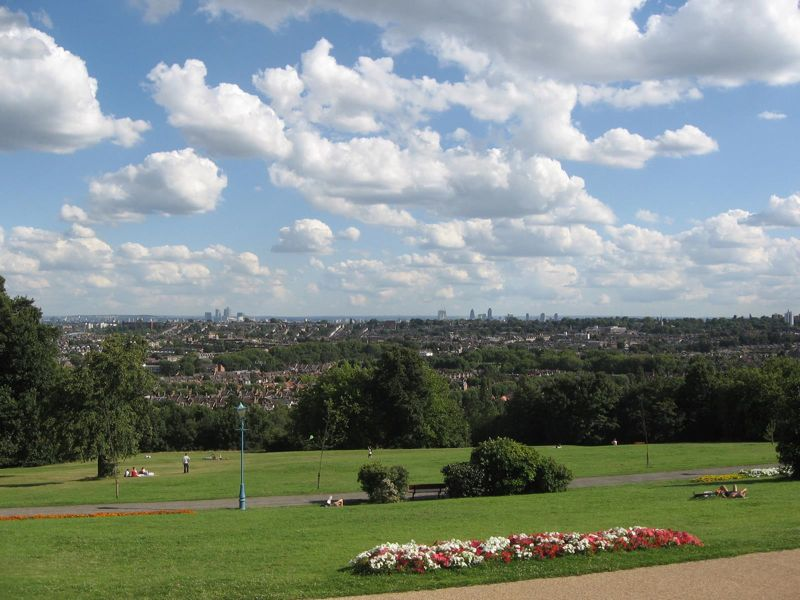
South-west Haringey with Canary Wharf (left) and the City (centre) in the background, from Alexandra Palace, one of the highest points in London

The names Haringey, Harringay (Note: Harringay is an area within the London Borough of Haringey. The two differently spelt words describe different places and they are not interchangeable.) and Hornsey in use today are all different variations of the same Old English: Hæringeshege. Hæring was a Saxon chief who probably lived in the area around Hornsey. Hæringeshege meant Hæring's enclosure and evolved into Haringey, Harringay and Hornsey.

In the Last Glacial Maximum, Haringey was at the edge of a huge glacial mass that reached as far south as Muswell Hill. There is evidence of both Stone Age and Bronze Age activity.

== History ==
=== Background ===
In the Iron Age and Roman periods, Haringey was peopled by a Celtic tribe called the Catuvellauni, whose extensive lands centred on Hertfordshire and Middlesex. The Romans' presence is evidenced chiefly by the roads they built through the area. Tottenham High Road was part of the main Roman thoroughfare of Ermine Street. There have also been Roman finds in the borough which suggests possible Roman settlement.

In the fifth and sixth centuries, after the Saxon invasions, the settlement of Haeringehaia was founded; its name coming from the Old English haeringe meaning a "meadow of hares".

Haringey remained a rural area until the 18th century, when large country houses close to London became increasingly common. The coming of the railways from the mid-19th century onwards led to rapid urbanisation; by the turn of the century much of Haringey had been transformed from a rural to an urbanised environment.

=== Administrative history ===
The area of the modern borough broadly corresponds to the two ancient parishes of Tottenham (which covered most of the area) and Hornsey in the south-west. Both parishes were historically in the county of Middlesex, with Tottenham being in Edmonton Hundred and Hornsey in Ossulstone Hundred. Ossulstone was later split into divisions for certain administrative functions, and Hornsey was included in its Finsbury division.

The ancient parishes provided a framework for both civil (administrative) and ecclesiastical (church) functions, but during the 19th century there was a divergence into distinct civil and ecclesiastical parish systems. The ecclesiastical parishes were gradually sub-divided to better serve the needs of a growing population, while the civil parishes continued to be based on the ancient parishes. The civil parish of Tottenham was made a local board district in 1850, with an elected board overseeing public health and responsible for the provision of infrastructure.

Similar local government districts were created for South Hornsey in 1865, and for the rest of Hornsey parish in 1867. The boundary between the Hornsey and South Hornsey districts was adjusted in 1874 to follow the Seven Sisters Road. The Tottenham district was divided in 1888, when its western part was made a separate district called Wood Green.

The four districts of Hornsey, South Hornsey, Tottenham and Wood Green were each reconstituted as urban districts under the Local Government Act 1894. South Hornsey Urban District was abolished in 1900 when it was absorbed into the Metropolitan Borough of Stoke Newington. Hornsey Urban District was incorporated to become a municipal borough in 1903, as were Wood Green in 1933, and Tottenham in 1934.

The modern borough was created in 1965 under the London Government Act 1963, covering the combined area of the three municipal boroughs of Hornsey, Tottenham and Wood Green. The area was transferred from Middlesex to Greater London, becoming one of the 32 London boroughs. The new borough was given the name Haringey, which was an old name for Hornsey.

== Governance ==
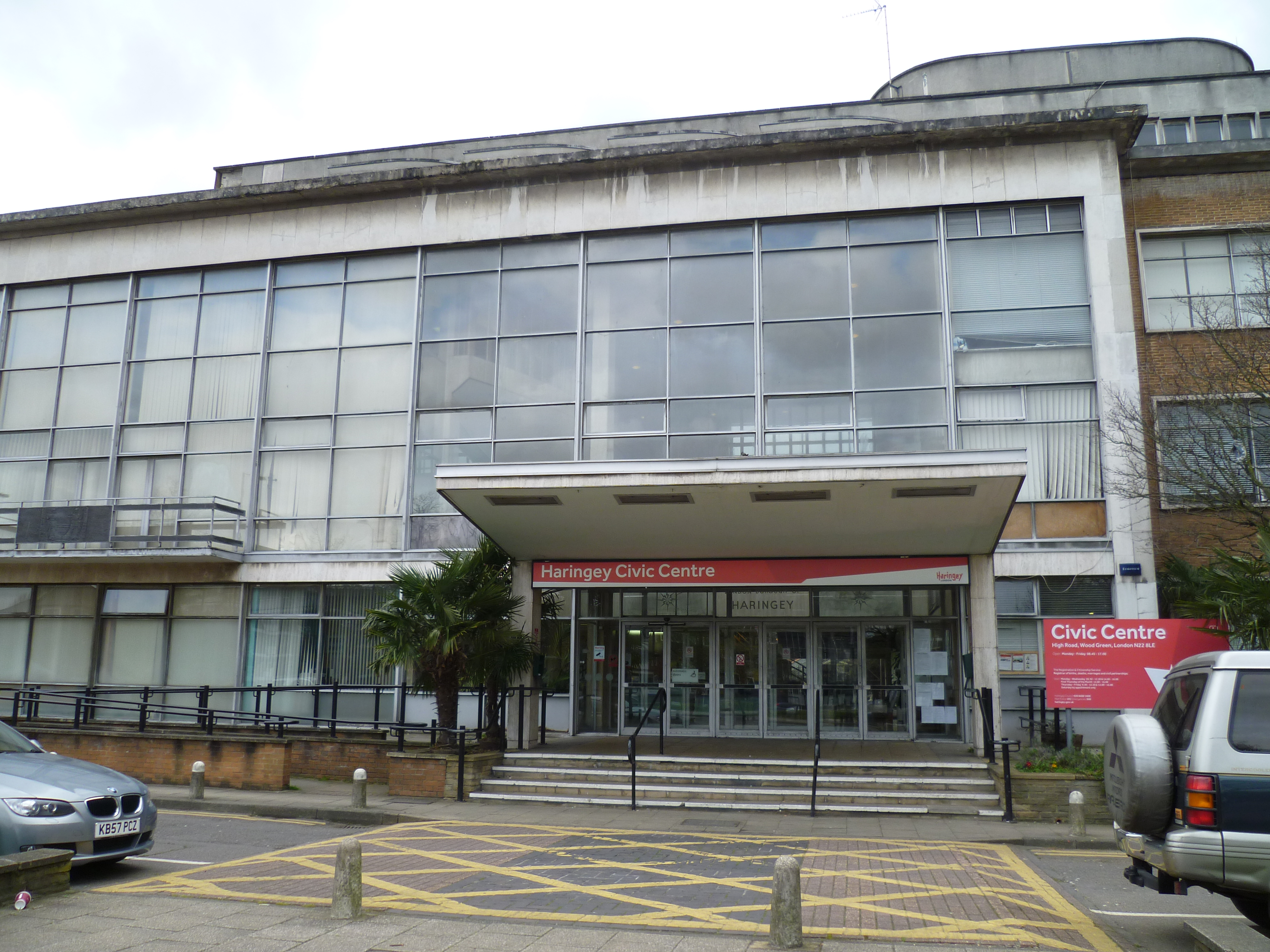
Haringey Civic Centre is the council's usual headquarters

The local authority is Haringey Council. It is usually based at the Haringey Civic Centre on High Road in Wood Green, although the building is closed pending refurbishment as at 2024.

Since 2000, for elections to the London Assembly, the borough forms part of the Enfield and Haringey constituency.

== Geography ==
See also List of districts in Haringey.

=== Physical ===
Haringey is a borough of contrasts geographically. From the wooded high ground around Highgate and Muswell Hill, at 426.5 feet (130.0 m), the land falls sharply away to the flat, open low-lying land beside the river Lea in the east. An area of 148 acres (60 ha) within the borough are designated as part of the Metropolitan Green Belt. It covers an area of more than 11 square miles (28.5 km^{2}). Some of the more familiar local landmarks include Alexandra Palace, Bruce Castle and the Tottenham Hotspur Stadium.

Haringey has 600 acres (243 ha) of parks, recreation grounds and open spaces which make up more than 25% of its total area. They include both smaller local areas and large green areas which provide an amenity for Londoners beyond the borough's boundaries. Local Nature Reserves and a number of conservation areas can also be found in the borough. The borough is also home to five distinct ancient woodlands: Highgate Woods, Queen's Wood, Coldfall Wood, Bluebell Wood and North Wood. Other large open spaces include Finsbury Park, Alexandra Park and the Lee Valley Park.

The borough has achieved Green Flag status for 25 of its parks, meaning they are judged to be welcoming, safe and well-managed, with active community involvement.

There are three rivers of note still flowing above ground in the borough:

- River Moselle
- The New River
- River Lea.

=== Demographics ===
Population pyramid of Haringey in 2021

Population (2024 estimate)
Year	Pop.	±%
1801	2,448	—
1811	4,481	+83.0%
1821	5,373	+19.9%
1831	6,201	+15.4%
1841	7,571	+22.1%
1851	8,762	+15.7%
1861	34,651	+295.5%
1871	60,541	+74.7%
1881	86,431	+42.8%
1891	158,596	+83.5%
1901	204,226	+28.8%
1911	263,009	+28.8%
1921	279,928	+6.4%
1931	297,936	+6.4%
1941	283,737	−4.8%
1951	270,214	−4.8%
1961	254,541	−5.8%
1971	239,833	−5.8%
1981	202,641	−15.5%
1991	211,633	+4.4%
2001	216,510	+2.3%
2011	254,926	+17.7%
2021	264,238	+3.7%
2024 estimate	263,850	−0.1%

According to the GLA's population projections for 2018, the current population of Haringey is 282,904 residents.

Haringey is the sixth most deprived borough in London, and the 30th most deprived local authority in England (out of 326). Within the borough, there are extreme contrasts: neighbourhoods in some of the western wards, such as Highgate, Muswell Hill and Crouch End are among the most prosperous in the country; in the east of the borough, many neighbourhoods are classified as being among the most deprived in the country.

The population grew by 17.7% between the 2001 and 2011 censuses; it is projected to have grown by a further 11% between 2011 and 2018.

The male to female ratio in Haringey is 50:50. While the age structure is similar to that of London, the borough has a slightly larger proportion of residents aged 20–44, and a slightly smaller proportion of residents aged 65+.

According to the GLA Population Estimate for 2018, 33.6% of the borough's population are White British, 25.9% are "Other White", 8.2% are of Black African heritage and 5.8% are of Black Caribbean heritage. Haringey is also home to several smaller Asian communities.

Christians form 44% of the population, 12% are Muslim and 3% Jewish. The Muslim population is centred in the middle of the borough around Harringay, while the Jewish community is largest on the western edges of the borough in Highgate, Muswell Hill and Crouch End (where members are predominately Orthodox, Reform and Liberal), and in the Seven Sisters ward in the east of the borough which is home to South Tottenham's largest Jewish community, who make up 18.1% of the population of the ward.

=== Ethnicity ===
Ethnic Group	Year													
Ethnic Group	1966 estimations		1971 estimations		1981 estimations		1991 census		2001 census		2011 census		2021 census	
Ethnic Group	Number	%	Number	%	Number	%	Number	%	Number	%	Number	%	Number	%
White: Total	–	93.3%	205,485	85.6%	160,099	78.1%	149,528	70.6%	142,082	65.6%	154,343	60.5%	150,581	57.1%
White: British	–	–	–	–	–	–	–	–	98,028	45.3%	88,424	34.6%	84,298	31.9%
White: Irish	–	4.3%	–	–	–	–	–	–	9,302	4.3%	6,997	2.7%	5,701	2.2%
White: Gypsy or Irish Traveller	–	–	–	–	–	–	–	–	–	–	370	0.1%	235	0.1%
White: Roma	–	–	–	–	–	–	–	–	–	–	–	–	2,004	0.8%
White: Other	–	–	–	–	–	–	–	–	34,752	16.1%	58,552	23.0%	58,343	22.1%
Asian or Asian British: Total	–	1.6%	–	–	12,195	5.9%	19,753	9.3%	16,970	7.8%	24,150	9.5%	23,080	8.7%
Asian or Asian British: Indian	–	–	–	–	5,811		7,689		6,171	2.9%	5,945	2.3%	5,838	2.2%
Asian or Asian British: Pakistani	–	–	–	–	1,141		1,565		2,046	0.9%	1,920	0.8%	2,162	0.8%
Asian or Asian British: Bangladeshi	–	–	–	–	1,355		3,238		2,961	1.4%	4,417	1.7%	4,819	1.8%
Asian or Asian British: Chinese	–	–	–	–	1,634		2,407		2,444	1.1%	3,744	1.5%	3,848	1.5%
Asian or Asian British: Other Asian	–	–	–	–	2,254		4,854		3,348	1.5%	8,124	3.2%	6,413	2.4%
Black or Black British: Total	–	5.1%	–	–	28,950	14.1%	36,754	17.4%	43,377	20.1%	47,830	18.7%	46,466	17.6%
Black or Black British: African	–	0.9%	–	–	7,802	3.8%	11,864		20,570	12.0%	23,037	11.4%	24,855	9.4%
Black or Black British: Caribbean	–	4.2%	–	–	17,275	8.4%	19,958	9.4%	19,879	10.3%	18,087	7.8%	16,339	6.2%
Black or Black British: Other Black	–	–	–	–	3,873		4,932		2,928	2.4%	6,706	3.9%	5,272	2.0%
Mixed or British Mixed: Total	–	–	–	–	–	–	–	–	9,846	4.6%	16,548	6.5%	18,556	7.1%
Mixed: White and Black Caribbean	–	–	–	–	–	–	–	–	3,205	1.5%	4,856	1.9%	5,325	2.0%
Mixed: White and Black African	–	–	–	–	–	–	–	–	1,551	0.7%	2,609	1.0%	2,574	1.0%
Mixed: White and Asian	–	–	–	–	–	–	–	–	2,329	1.1%	3,738	1.5%	3,915	1.5%
Mixed: Other Mixed	–	–	–	–	–	–	–	–	2,761	1.3%	5,345	2.1%	6,742	2.6%
Other: Total	–	–	–	–	3,746		5,766		4,232	2.0%	12,055	5.3%	25,555	9.7%
Other: Arab	–	–	–	–	–	–	–	–	–	–	2,229	0.9%	2,525	1.0%
Other: Any other ethnic group	–	–	–	–	–	–	–	–	4,232	2.0%	9,286	3.9%	23,030	8.7%
Ethnic minority: Total	–	6.7%	34,595	14.4%	44,891	21.9%	62,273	29.4%	74,425	34.5%	100,583	39.5%	113,657	42.9%
Total	–	100%	240,080	100%	204,990	100%	211,801	100%	202,204	100%	254,926	100%	264,238	100%

=== Religion ===
Haringey is a religiously diverse borough, with large populations of all major world religions; the 2021 census results were as follows:

- Christianity - 39.3%
- Islam - 12.6%
- Judaism - 3.6%
- Hinduism - 1.3%
- Buddhism - 0.9%
- Sikhism - 0.3%
- Other religions - 2.3%
- No religion - 31.6%
- Not stated - 8.0%.

=== Immigration ===
This list includes top-15 sources of immigration to Borough of Haringey for 2021 census:

#	Country	Number
1	Turkiye	9,465
2	Poland	7,212
3	Romania	6,353
4	Bulgaria	5,905
5	Italy	5,279
6	Jamaica	3,799
7	Spain	3,357
8	Ireland	3,312
9	Ghana	3,153
10	Cyprus	3,136
11	Brazil	3,045
12	Albania	2,867
13	Colombia	2,674
14	Somalia	2,642
15	Nigeria	2,380

== Public services ==
=== Housing ===
There are approximately 114,313 dwellings in Haringey; of those: 43% are owner occupied, 29% are rented from the local authority or a housing association and 24% are rented from a private landlord.

The local council and housing associations provide just over 27,000 affordable homes. As of Q4 2017, there were 3,002 households living in temporary accommodation in Haringey.

=== Education ===
Haringey has 64 primary schools, 11 secondary schools, a City Academy, five special schools and a pupil support centre. In addition, there are off-site provision and study support centres for children and young people with additional needs.

The number of pupils in Haringey Schools, as at January 2017, was 41,550 (including nursery age children). This total was made up as follows:

- Primary (state-funded) 23,735 (pupils of compulsory school age).
- Secondary (state-funded) 13,377 (including sixth form students).
- Special School pupils and students 485 (including post 16 children).

=== Health and social care ===
NHS services provide healthcare for all residents of Haringey. There are 52 General Practices across the borough as of 2022. These are grouped into eight Primary Care Networks with Haringey GP Federation covering the entire borough. In addition to Primary Care the population is cared for by several hospitals including the North Middlesex University Hospital, Homerton Hospital, Whittington Hospital and St Ann's Hospital. In addition, there are several Health & Social Care providers across the borough.

== Economy ==
In 2016, there were 12,150 businesses in Haringey employing a total of 66,000 people. This accounted for 1.3% of all employment in London.

Haringey's economy is dominated by small businesses, with 93.9% of businesses employing fewer than ten people.

The main sectors of employment in Haringey are:

- Wholesale distribution and retail trade – 18.2%
- Health and social work - 19.0%
- Real estate, renting and business activities - 15.3%
- Education - 12.18%
- Manufacturing - 8.3%
- Public administration - 6.8%
- Health and social work – 10.6%
- Accommodation & Food Service activities – 9.1%
- Professional, Scientific & Technical activities - 7.6%
- Administrative and Support Service activities - 6.8%
- Transport & Storage – 6.1%
- Manufacturing – 4.5%
- Public administration & Defence; Compulsory Social Security – 4.5%
- Construction - 4.5%
- Manufacturing - 4.5%
- Arts, Entertainment and Recreation – 4.5%
- Information & Communication – 3.8%
- Real estate activities - 3%
- Financial & Insurance activities – 1.1%
- Water supply, Sewerage, Waste management & Remediation activities – 0.6%
- Other service activities – 3%.

The principal shopping areas in the borough are Wood Green and Turnpike Lane, Muswell Hill, Crouch End, Harringay and Tottenham Hale.

Haringey is situated within the growth corridor connecting London with Stansted, Cambridge and Peterborough.

== Transport ==
=== Railways ===
There are 16 railway stations in the borough, with services run by four operators:

Greater Anglia:

- Northumberland Park: on the Lea Valley Line
- Tottenham Hale: on the Lea Valley Line.

Great Northern:

- Alexandra Palace: on the East Coast Main Line (ECML)
- Bowes Park: on the Hertford North branch
- Harringay: on the ECML
- Hornsey: on the ECML.

London Overground:

- Bruce Grove: on the Lea Valley lines and Cheshunt branch
- Harringay Green Lanes: on the Gospel Oak to Barking line
- Seven Sisters: on the Lea Valley Lines and Cheshunt branch
- South Tottenham: Gospel Oak to Barking line
- White Hart Lane: on the Lea Valley Lines and Cheshunt branch.

London Underground:

- Bounds Green: Piccadilly line
- Highgate: Northern line
- Manor House: Piccadilly line
- Seven Sisters: Victoria line
- Tottenham Hale: Victoria line
- Turnpike Lane: Piccadilly line
- Wood Green: Piccadilly line.

=== Statistics ===
In March 2011, the main forms of transport that residents used to travel to work were: underground, metro, light rail, tram, 23.5% of all residents aged 16–74; driving a car or van, 11.3%; bus, minibus or coach, 11.3%; train, 4.7%; on foot, 4.1%; work mainly at or from home, 3.6%; bicycle, 3.2%. (Note: Percentages are of all residents aged 16-74 including those not in employment. Respondents could only pick one mode, specified as the journey’s longest part by distance.)

== Culture ==
Haringey's theatres and other venues include:

- Alexandra Palace's Great Hall, Theatre and West Hall
- Haringey Shed - an outreach theatre group of Chicken Shed Theatre.
- Jacksons Lane - a multi-arts centre with a full-time programme of theatre and participatory events.
- New London Performing Arts Centre provides affordable, accessible drama, dance, singing and music classes to children of all ages
- Bernie Grant Arts Centre.
- Upstairs at the Gatehouse, Highgate
- Downstairs at the King's Head
- St Mary's Tower, Hornsey.
- The Chocolate Factory (visual arts):

== Sport ==
Tottenham Hotspur Football Club, currently in the FA Premier League, play at the Tottenham Hotspur Stadium, which is located in the borough on Tottenham High Road. The borough also has two non-League football clubs: Haringey Borough F.C. and Greenhouse London F.C., which both play at Coles Park.

London Skolars are a rugby league team that compete in Kingstone Press League 1. They play at New River Stadium in Wood Green, Haringey. The annual Middlesex nines rugby league tournament also takes place at the New River Stadium.

The borough's ice hockey team, the Haringey Huskies, currently plays at Alexandra Palace, which has also hosted other events including the PDC World Darts Championship and a number of Boxing events.

During the 1970s, 80s and 90s, the Haringey Athletic Club were at the forefront of a new generation of inner-city athletes producing many Olympians. They have since been amalgamated into the Enfield and Haringey Athletic Club. London Heathside, formed in 2000 following the merger of North London AC and Muswell Hill Runners, are also based at the London Marathon Athletics Track at Finsbury Park.

== Twin towns ==
Haringey has been twinned with Koblenz, Germany, since 1969. It has also twinned with the towns of:

- Arima, Trinidad and Tobago
- Clarendon, Jamaica
- Holetown, in St. James, Barbados,
- Larnaca, Cyprus
- Livry-Gargan, in Paris, France
- Sundbyberg, Sweden
- Jalasjärvi, Finland.

== Coat of arms ==
Haringey's coat of arms

The official heraldic arms were granted on 10 May 1965, after the mergers of the former municipal boroughs of Hornsey, Wood Green and Tottenham. Unlike most other London boroughs, it was decided not to create arms based on the charges in the coats of arms of the former boroughs. The coat of arms contains black and gold, representing stability, a cogwheel for industry and a rising sun for the new borough.

The borough has a simple badge described as "Eight Rays" [as in the arms]. A flag is used which looks like a banner of arms but with the tinctures reversed, so that it has eight black rays on a yellow field. The rays are also a symbol of the world's first regular high-definition television transmissions in 1936 from the mast of Alexandra Palace, one of the landmarks in the Borough of Haringey.

The arms is used in the mayoral regalia of the borough. The mayoral chain has the heraldic achievement hanging in a badge made out of 18 k gold and enamel, with the text "The London Borough of Haringey MCMLXV". The chain has stylized H's and hares sitting within laurel wreaths. The hares represent the name of the borough, since Haringey is believed to mean "a meadow of Hares".
