= Highgate Wood =

Ancient woodland in North London

Coordinates: 51.583°N 0.150°W

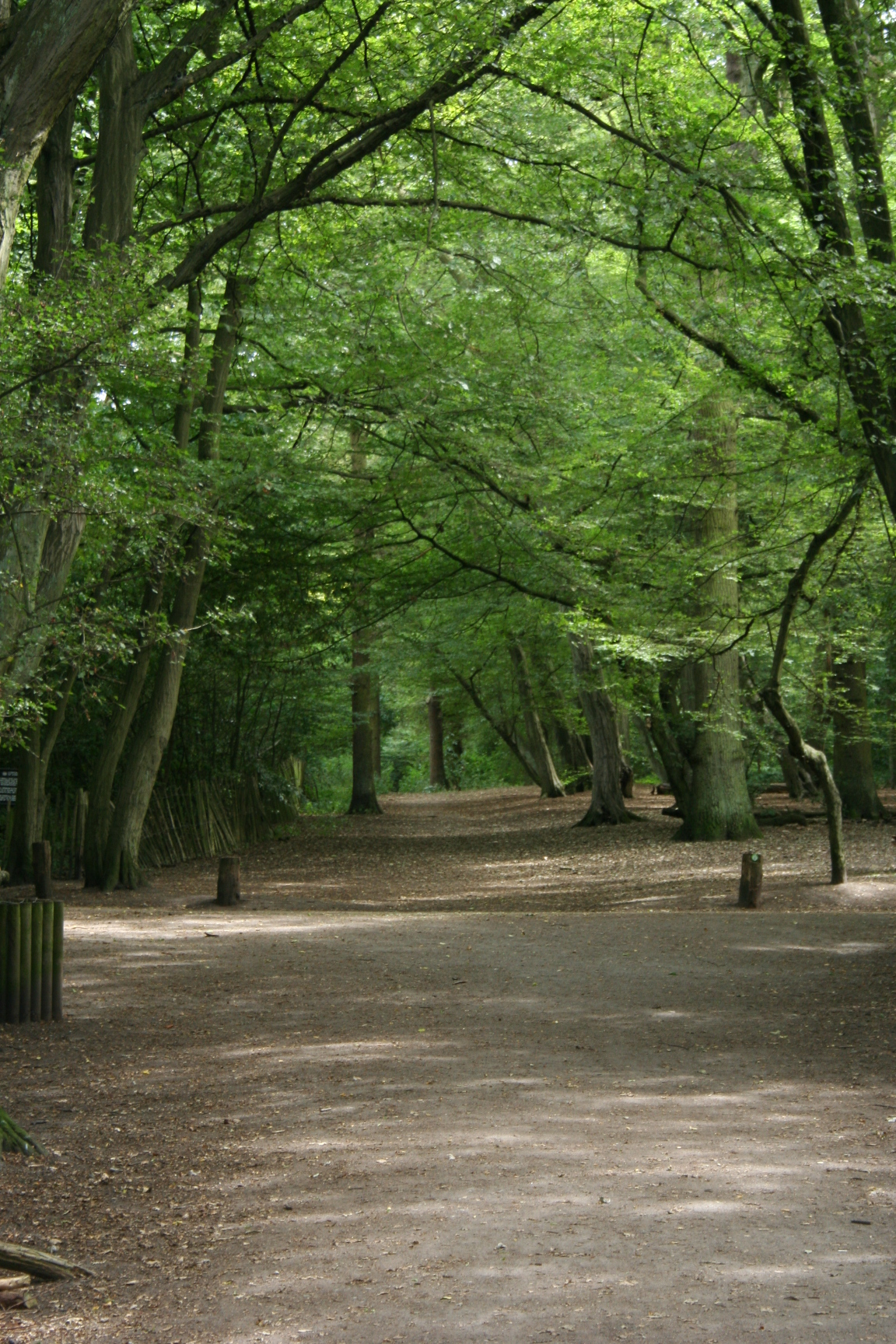
- Highgate Wood in late July 2006
- Interactive map of Highgate Wood
- Area: 28 hectares (69 acres)
- Operator: Corporation of London
- Open: daylight hours

Highgate Wood is a 28 hectare (70 acre) area of ancient woodland in North London, lying between East Finchley, Highgate and Muswell Hill. It was originally part of the ancient Forest of Middlesex which covered much of London, Hertfordshire and Essex and was mentioned in the Domesday Book. It lies in the London Borough of Haringey, but is owned and managed by the City of London Corporation.

The London Borough of Haringey contains four ancient woods: Highgate Wood, Queen's Wood, Coldfall Wood and Bluebell Wood. Highgate Wood is shown on the Ordnance Survey map of Middlesex in 1886 more or less in its present formation, but known by the name "Gravelpit Wood".

== Flora and fauna ==
The flora and fauna in the wood have been managed to varying degrees by humans through the ages.

Predominantly an oak, hornbeam and holly wood, Highgate Wood is also home to more than 50 other tree and shrub species which have self-seeded there. The wild service tree, a rare deciduous tree with brown berries, can be found in Highgate Wood. Presence of the wild service tree is commonly taken as an indicator of ancient woodland.

71 different species of bird have been recorded, alongside foxes, grey squirrels, bat species including pipistrelle, Natterer's bat, common noctule and the rare Leisler's bat, 180 species of moth, 12 species of butterfly and 80 species of spider.

== History ==
=== Human artefacts ===
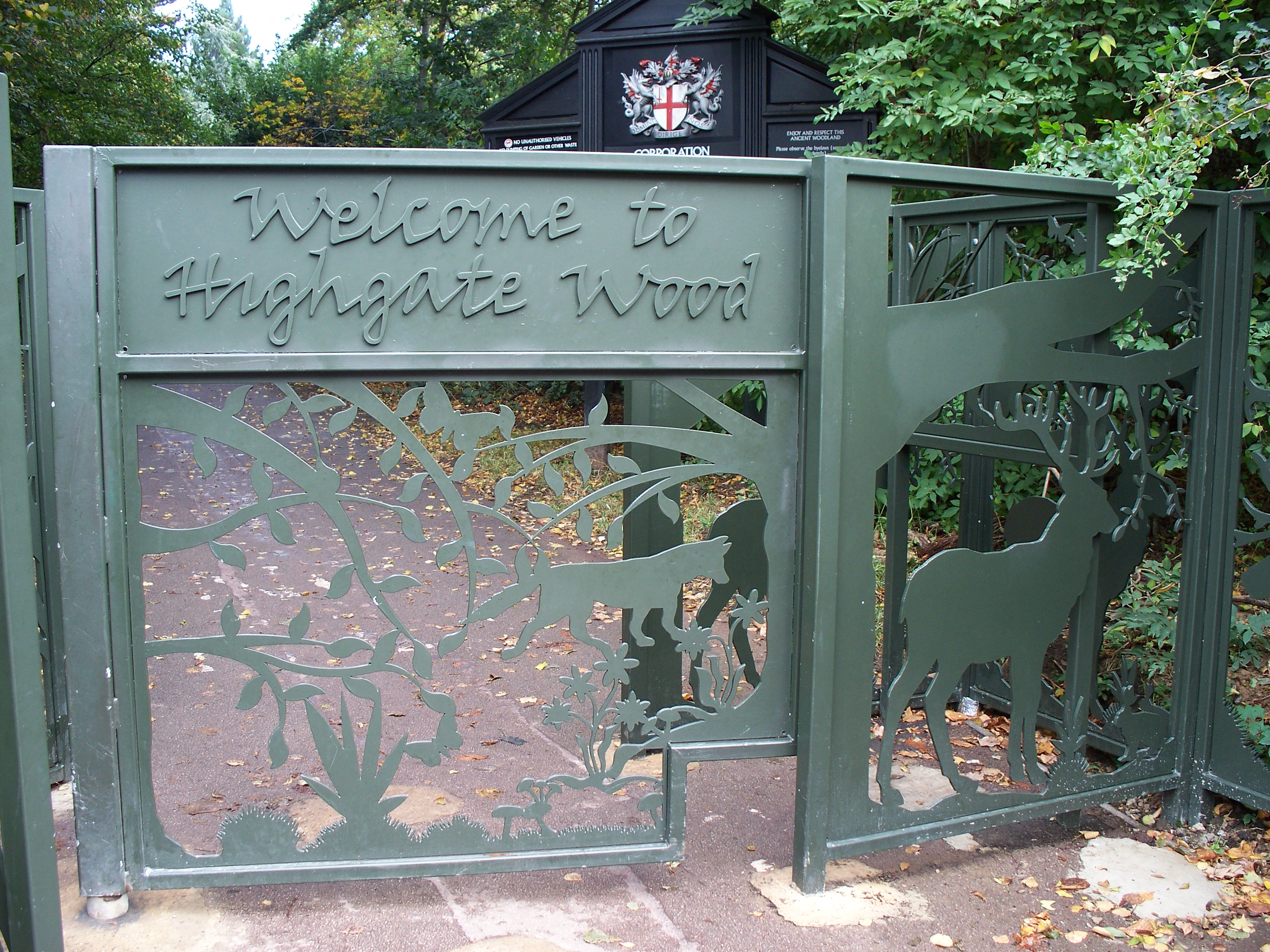
Entrance gates to Highgate Wood

Prehistoric flints have been found in the wood. Excavations on the ridge at the northern end of the wood established that Romano-Britons were producing pottery from local materials between AD 50–100.

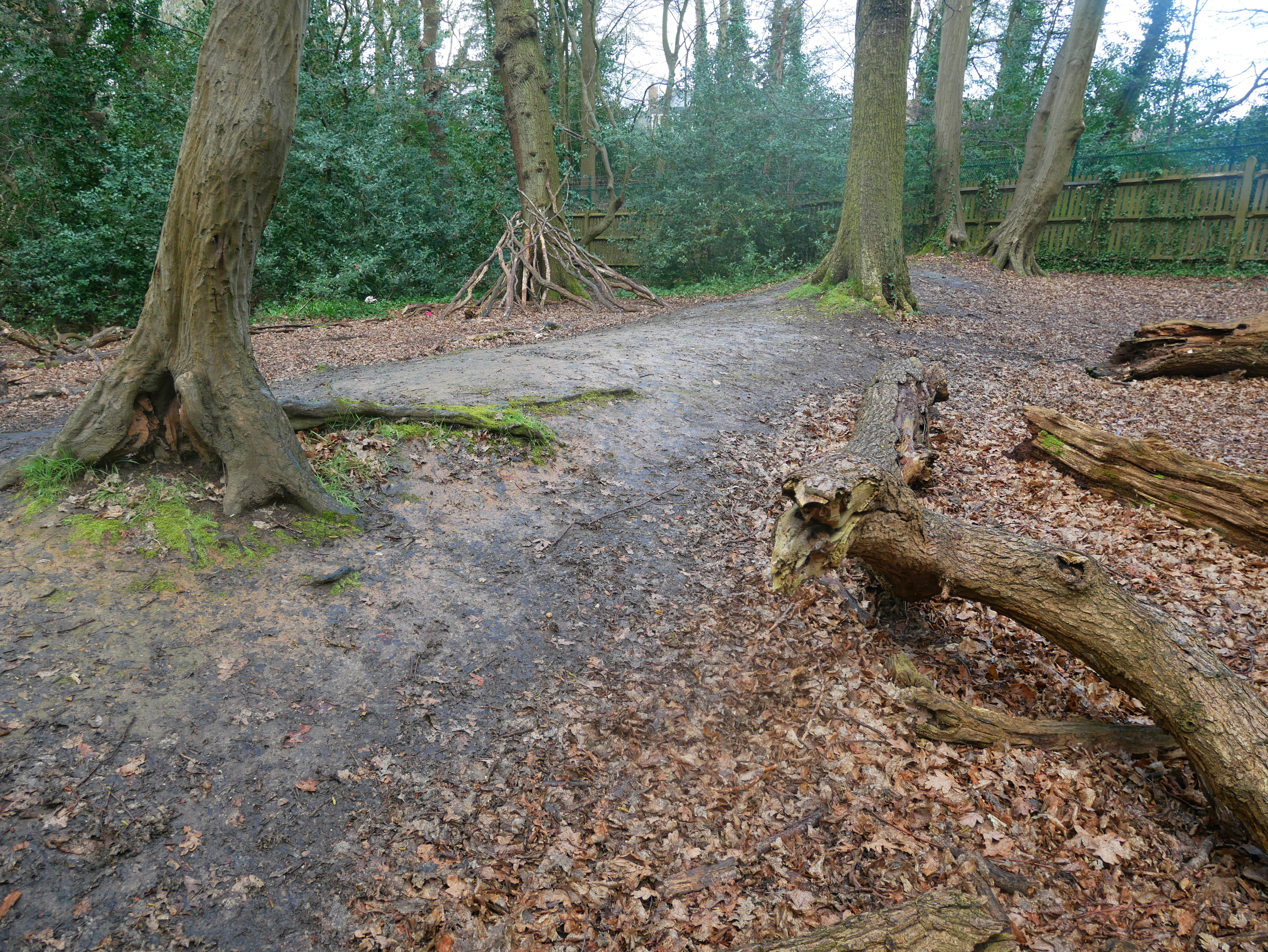
The west end of the linear earthwork running across the northern part of Highgate Wood

An ancient earthwork runs across the wood. This may have formed part of an enclosure for deer during the Medieval period, when the Bishop of London owned the wood; however, it could also be a prehistoric boundary or defensive work. During the Medieval period, the wood formed part of the Bishop of London’s hunting estate. Between the 16th and 18th centuries, the wood, known then as "Brewer's Fell", was leased to various tenants who managed it by 'coppicing with standards'. This involved regularly cutting down areas of Hornbeams to a stump ('coppicing') to encourage new growth which could be used for fuel or fencing, whilst allowing oak and other tree species to grow to maturity ('standards'). Remnants of wood banks dividing these areas can still be seen. Many of these oaks were then used by the Crown to construct ships and by the Church to construct buildings.

In the 1880s, the last tenant gave up his lease. In 1886, the City of London Corporation acquired what was by then known as Gravelpit Wood (so named in 1863 on account of a gravel pit used to source gravel for roads in the district) from the Ecclesiastical Commissioners at no charge on condition that it was "maintained in perpetuity for the benefit of Londoners". It was renamed Highgate Wood; it has been owned and managed by the Corporation ever since.

== Care and management ==
The City of London Corporation's maintenance of the wood was not always sympathetic to its historical origins. On acquisition, asphalt paths were laid, ornamental trees were planted and dead wood was assiduously removed and burned. Highgate Wood was managed more as an urban park than ancient woodland. In 1968 the Conservation Committee of the London Natural History Society expressed its concern at the planting of exotic conifers as being inappropriate for ancient woodland. As a consequence of this protest the planting programme was halted and has not been continued.

More recently management practices have been much more sympathetic to the Wood's indigenous flora and fauna. Certain areas have been fenced to allow the regeneration of the vegetation free of trampling, and dead wood is allowed to decay ‘’in situ’’ — to the great benefit of saprotrophic fungi and a wide range of invertebrates.

== Nature reserve ==
Highgate Wood is a Site of Metropolitan Importance for Nature Conservation. It is also listed as one of only eight Green Heritage Sites in London.

== Facilities and access ==
Highgate Wood can be reached easily from Highgate station on the Northern line of the London Underground. It is adjacent to the A1 road and is situated approximately 6 miles (10 km) north of Charing Cross, well inside London's metropolitan area.

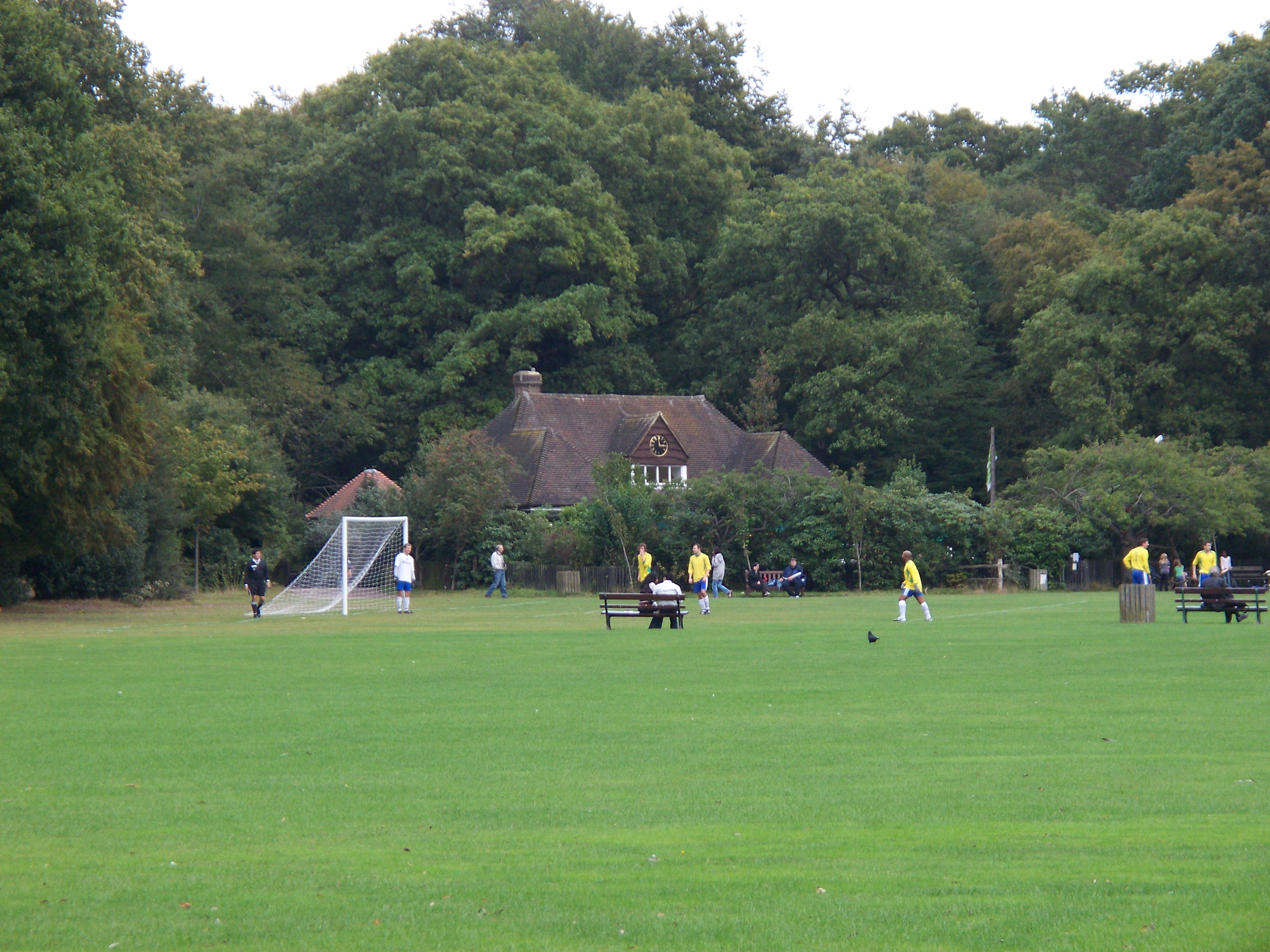
Pavilion and football pitch, Highgate Wood

As well as a football pitch and a cricket field, Highgate Wood has a children’s playground, a café and an information centre.

== Sources ==
- City of London website on Highgate Wood
- The Natural History of Haringey's Ancient Woodlands, by David Bevan
- Wild Service Tree
- "Distribution and Status of Bats in the London Area", Mickleburgh (1987)
- Middlesex: 012 Ordnance Survey 1:10,560: Epoch 1
