= Hornsey Central Hospital =

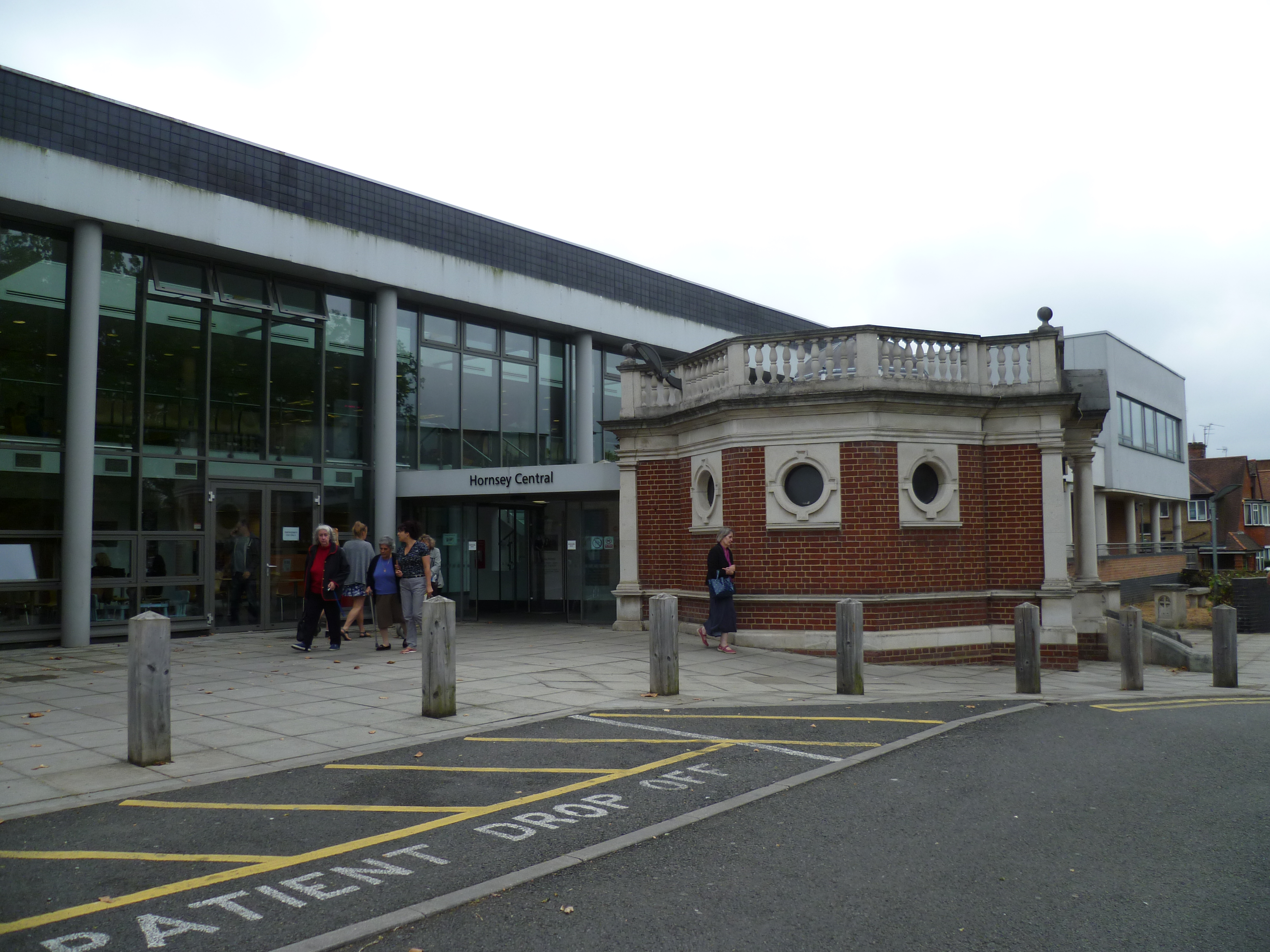
- Hornsey Central Hospital with the war memorial on the right.

- Location within Haringey

Geography
- Location: London, N8; United Kingdom
- Coordinates: 51.5841°N 0.1313°W

Organisation
- Care system: NHS

History
- Founded: 1910
- Closed: 2001

Hornsey Cottage Hospital, later Hornsey Central Hospital, was a local hospital in Crouch End, North London, opened in 1910. It closed in 2001, and was replaced by a polyclinic in 2009.

== History ==
A proposal for a 'hospital for the poor' was first made in 1897. Local fund raising eventually led to construction of the Hornsey Cottage Hospital on land provided by the Ecclesiastical Commissioners. The foundation stone was laid in 1907. Opening in 1910, the original hospital had sixteen beds.

Following the First World War a war memorial was built at the site, to commemorate 1,200 people from the borough who had died in the war. In 1924 the building was expanded, with a further 22 beds and a new operating theatre. In 1927 a further small extension was made and it was renamed as Hornsey Central Hospital. A nurses' home was added in 1930 and a children's ward (the Southwood Wing) in 1938.

After the introduction of the National Health Service in 1948, the hospital was administered by the North West Metropolitan Regional Hospital Board. A further extension was made in 1956.

The site continued as a general hospital until 1974, when it specialised in acute cases. In 1981 it became a geriatric hospital, providing long-term care for the elderly. In 1998 the local health authority decided that the hospital could no longer provide modern health care and it closed in 2001. The hospital was subsequently demolished and redeveloped as the Hornsey Central Neighbourhood Health Centre. The war memorial was retained.

== See also ==
- Healthcare in London
- List of hospitals in England
