= Miller & Carter, Muswell Hill =

Coordinates: 51.5902°N 0.1443°W

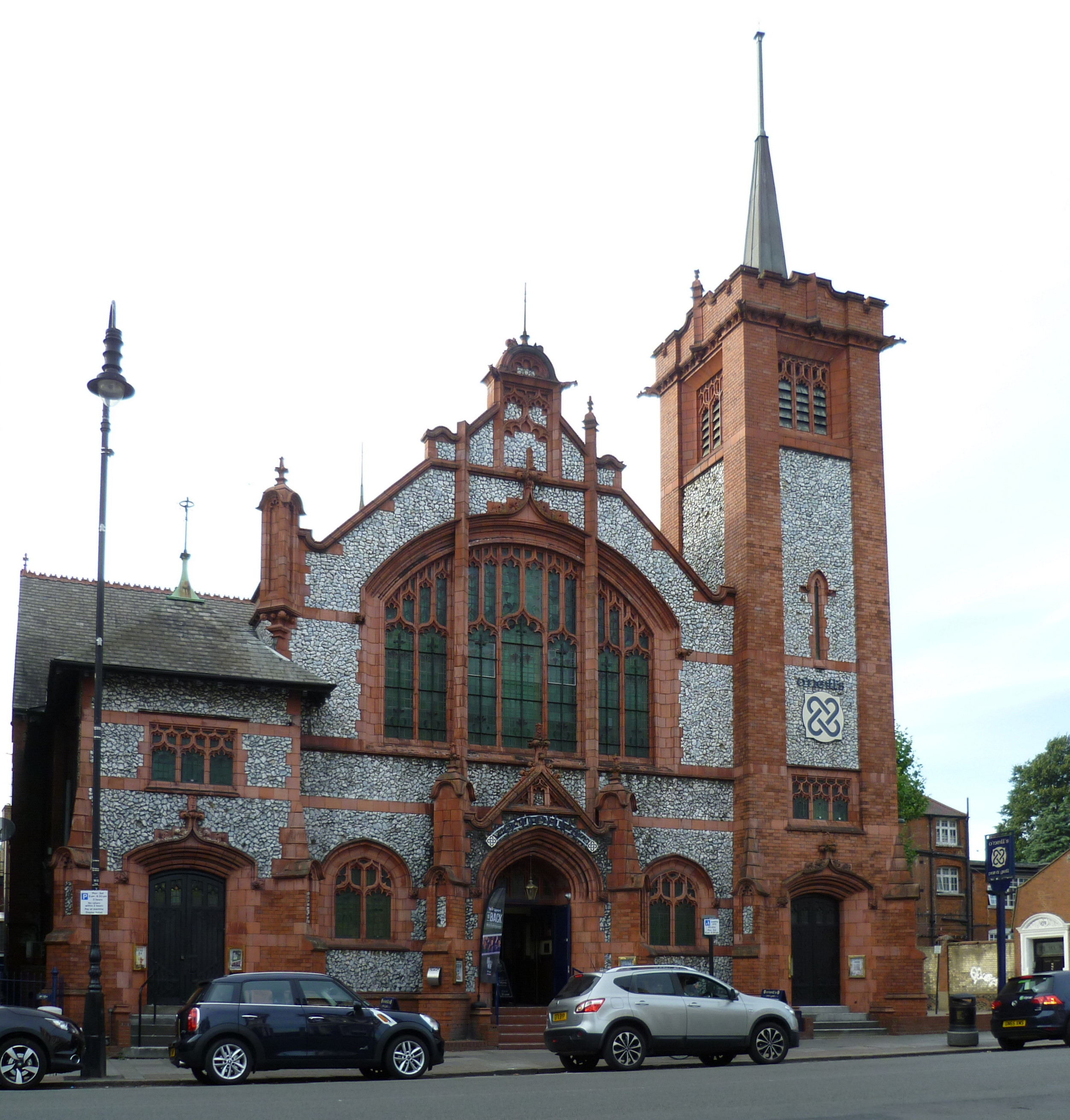
- Miller & Carter, Muswell Hill.
- Miller & Carter, Muswell Hill
- Location: Muswell Hill Broadway
- Country: England

The Miller & Carter in Muswell Hill Broadway is a Grade II listed building with Historic England. It is a former church. It was formerly an O'Neill's pub which closed in July 2017 for conversion to a Miller & Carter restaurant.
