= Alexandra Park, London =

Park in the London Borough of Haringey

Coordinates: 51.59568°N 0.12603°W

Alexandra Park
- Interactive map of Alexandra Park

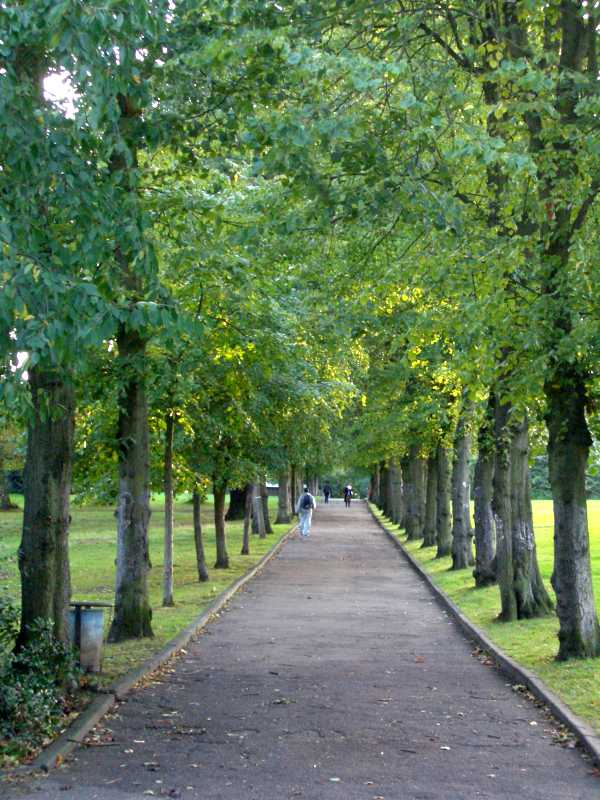
An avenue in the park lined with lime trees

Alexandra Park is a 200-acre (80–hectare), Green Flag Award, and Green Heritage winning, diverse-landscape park, in the Borough of Haringey in north London adjacent to Hornsey, Muswell Hill and Wood Green. Laid out on the site of Tottenham Wood and the later Tottenham Wood Farm, the park and palace were named in 1863, the year of the marriage of Alexandra of Denmark to the Prince of Wales who became King Edward VII.

Alexandra Park is split between hilly and flat ground. The tree-lined hill has wide views from slopes and many areas of the relatively large hilltop. Of note is the view from Alexandra Palace which dominates the park, particularly its Panorama Room. On most days the Crystal Palace Transmitter and/or the North Downs in Surrey are visible. From 1936 to 1981, the BBC transmitted TV programmes from a tall mast built onto one of the towers of the palace. In 1980, most of the palace was gutted by a huge fire. The building has since been restored and is now a conference and exhibition centre.

== History ==
The Alexandra Park and Palace (Public Purposes) Act 1900 (63 & 64 Vict. c. cclix) changed the status of the park from private ownership to a public trust. The first company was set up in the 1850s to build an educational, recreation and events venue to rival south London's Crystal Palace which took the main structure of the Great Exhibition, 1851 from Hyde Park, London. The act created the Alexandra Palace and Park Trust, by which the trustees were bound to maintain the palace and park and make them available for the free use and recreation of the public forever.

Until September 1970, the park hosted horse racing, including many evening meetings that were televised by the BBC. The Alexandra Park Racecourse on the plain below the palace was nicknamed "the Frying Pan" owing to its shape, featuring an ornate Victorian grandstand and cast-iron railings. For eight decades the whole venue had up to three stations, one of which was a tram station, to enable more visitors – for more details see Alexandra Palace railway station (1873–1954). Its most prestigious race was the London Cup. Alexandra Park Cricket Club and Football Club occupy most of the former site, sporting facilities for the local community.

A medium-sized lake attracts a variety of waterfowl in all seasons, and used to have a large enclosure housing a small herd of fallow deer. The deer were moved to Devon in early 2016. The park was declared a local nature reserve in 2013, and is also a Site of Borough Importance for Nature Conservation, Grade 1.

== Events ==
The park hosts a variety of events throughout the year; food, craft and beer festivals, a summer festival, a fireworks festival in November and a weekly Parkrun each Saturday morning.

The Friends of Alexandra Park organise walks, such as fungi, tree, wild flower, history and bat.

At the foot of Muswell Hill, the park is host to a farmers market most weeks.

== Access ==
Three means of access exist:

- the frequent W3 bus (connections at Wood Green and Finsbury Park tube stations)
- a relatively brisk 8–10 minutes walk uphill from Alexandra Palace railway station
- Car/motorbike/cycle parking, with motor parking limited by reservation for events

== Alexandra Park neighbourhood ==
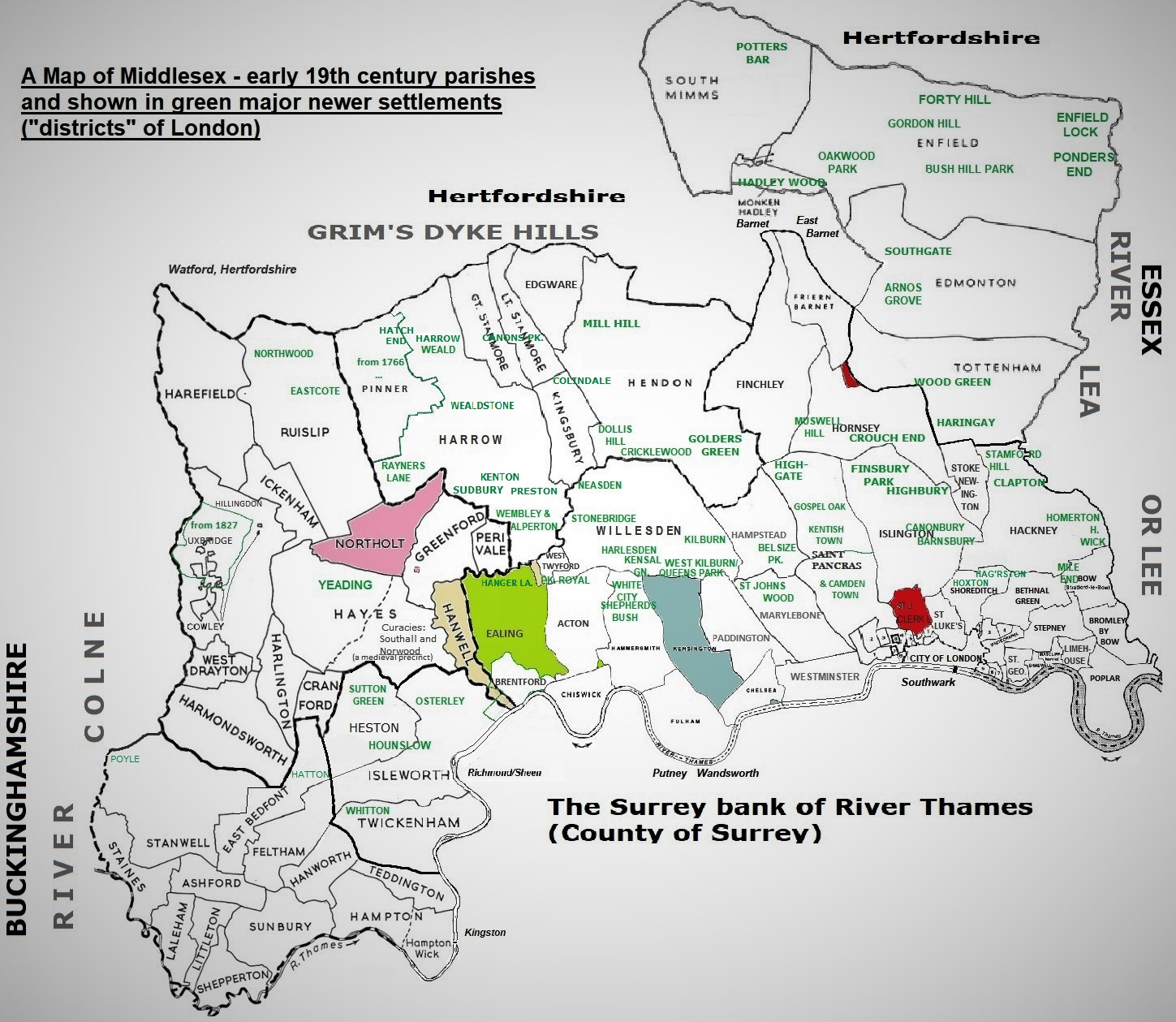
The traditional, original ancient parishes of the area which commences a short distance east of the red 0.1 square-mile parcel of northern Muswell Hill, which was a (St James) Clerkenwell exclave. Tottenham parish forms the core of the London Borough of Haringey.

The area directly north of the park is usually known locally as Alexandra Park, although technically it is just a locality of Wood Green, and part of the N22 postcode which derives from Wood Green. Like many London neighbourhoods, its precise boundaries are vague. It can be approximately bounded by the North Circular Road to the north, the Great Northern Railway line to the east, the park to the south and the medieval to 19th century hedge and ditch between the south of Rosebery Road and St Regis Close/Muswell Avenue followed by a clearer road with footpath, Alexandra Road.

The large neighbourhood's identity has been reinforced by its local website and Alexandra Park Library. It has a secondary school, Alexandra Park School and a primary school, Rhodes Avenue Primary School, which stands on the site of Tottenham Wood House which had a large farming estate and gardens. Since the demolition of the house and the naming of the neighbourhood's roads omitting Wood, Green or Tottenham, the remaining connections are a shared station in the east and shared postcode.

== See also ==
- Alexandra Park Racecourse
