= Muswell Hill Library =

Library in Muswell Hill, London, England

Coordinates: 51°35′28″N 0°08′36″W

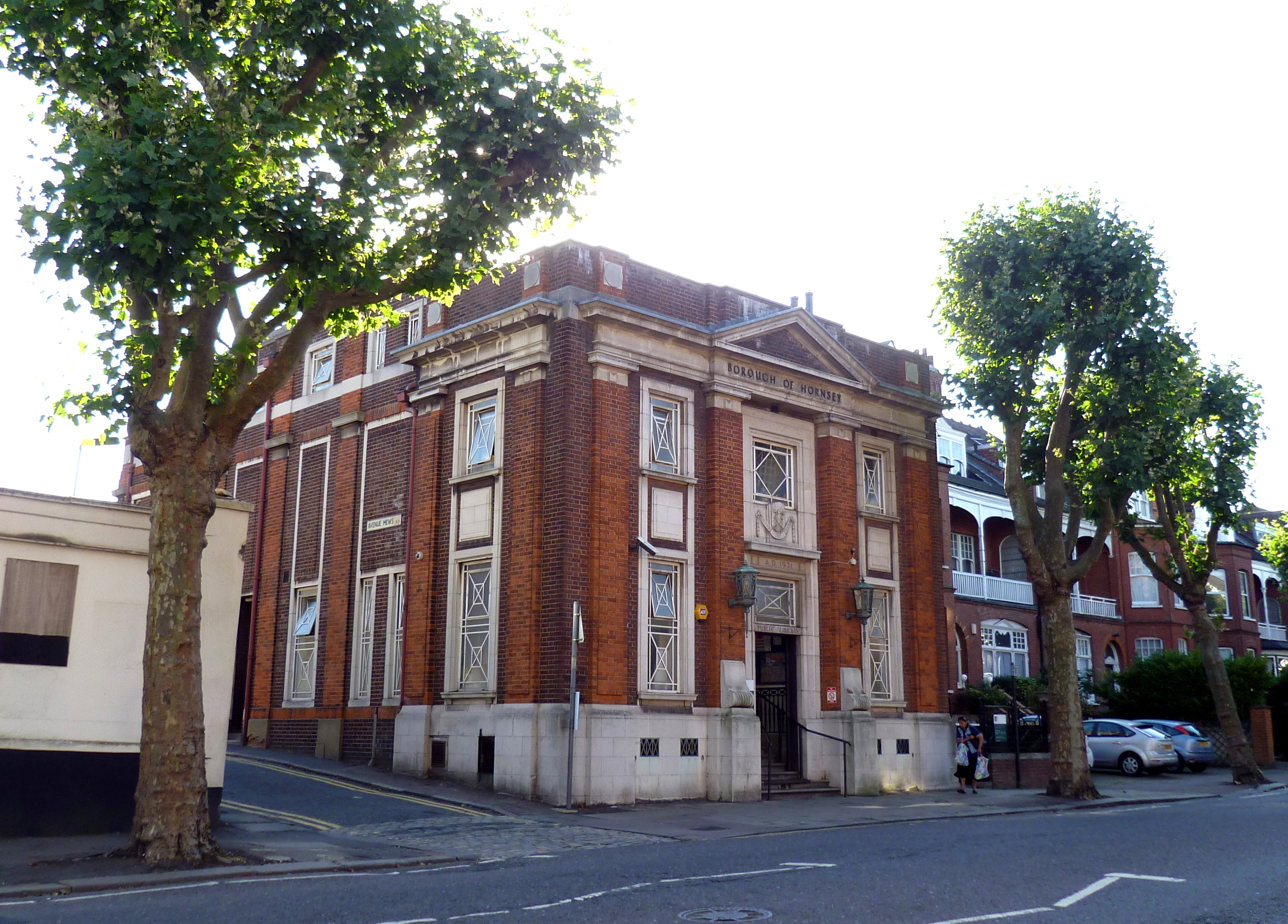
Muswell Hill Library

The Muswell Hill Library is a grade II listed building in Queens Avenue, Muswell Hill, London.
