= St James's Church Hall =

Listed building in Muswell Hill, London

Coordinates: 51°35′27″N 0°08′54″W

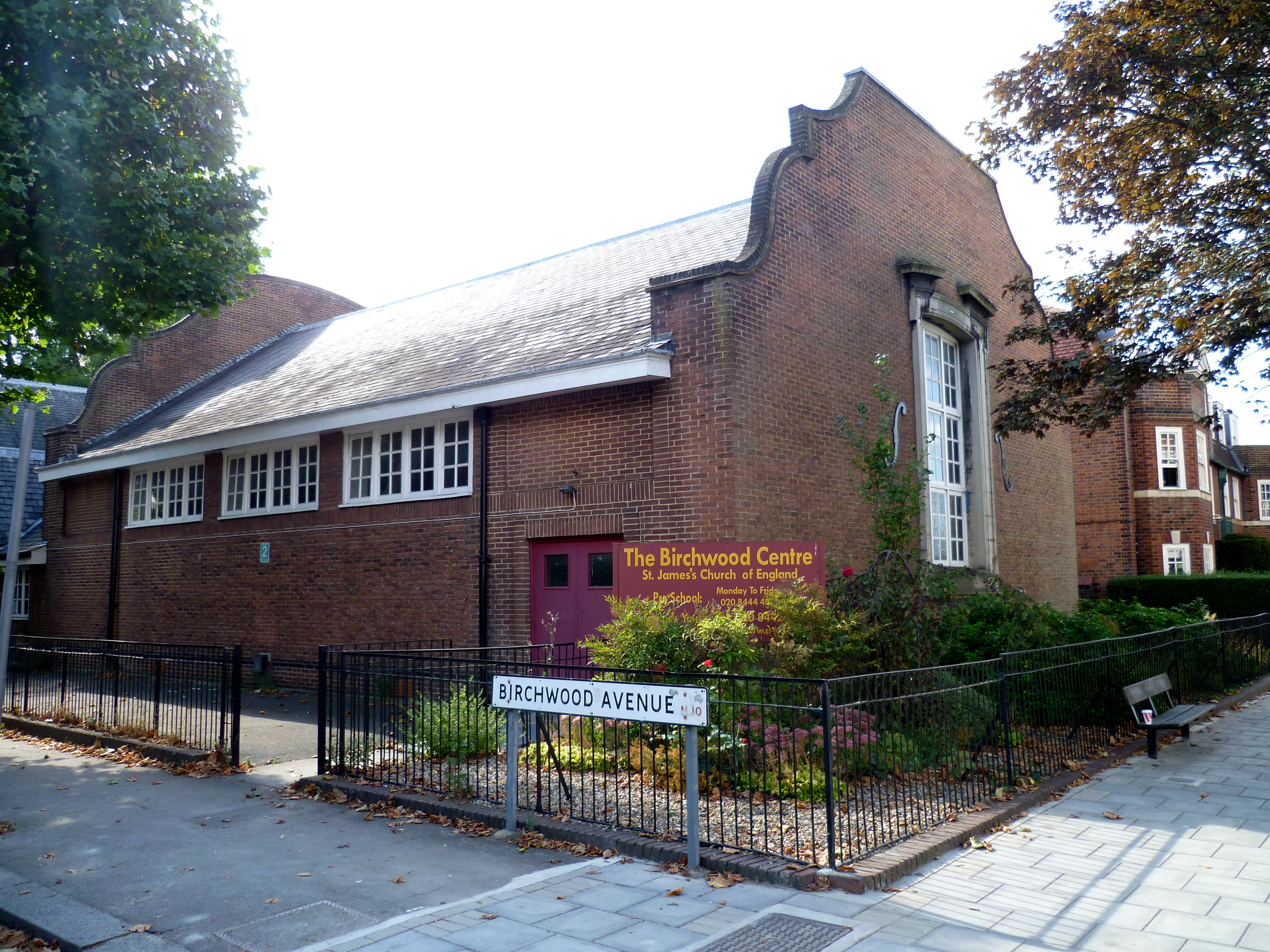
St James's Church Hall

St James's Church Hall is in Fortis Green Road, Muswell Hill, London. The church hall, a Grade II listed building, was built in 1925 to a design by George Grey Wornum for the use of the nearby St James Church.
