= Bluebell Wood, London =

Small remnant of one of the ancient woodlands of London

Coordinates: 51.6058°N 0.1357°W

Bluebell Wood in the London Borough of Haringey is a small remnant of one of the ancient woodlands of London. It is situated at the end of Winton Avenue and is bordered by Muswell Hill golf course, Winton Avenue and the Golf Course Allotments. Just over an acre in size, it is open at all times and is a popular place for local people to walk their dogs.

Dominated by sessile oak, the wood has a variety of wildlife including midland hawthorn and wild service tree. Birds including song thrush, chaffinch and magpie are commonly seen as well as butterflies and mammals such as squirrel, hedgehog and wood mouse. Despite its name, there are no native common bluebells (Hyacinthoides non-scripta) to be found here; only the occasional Spanish hybrid that has spread from neighbouring gardens.

The wood is the last surviving fragment of what was once a much larger woodland, Tottenham Wood, which in 1619 covered approximately 157 hectares (388 acres).
