= W. Martyn grocers shop =

Building in Haringey, London, England

Coordinates: 51°35′26″N 0°08′36″W

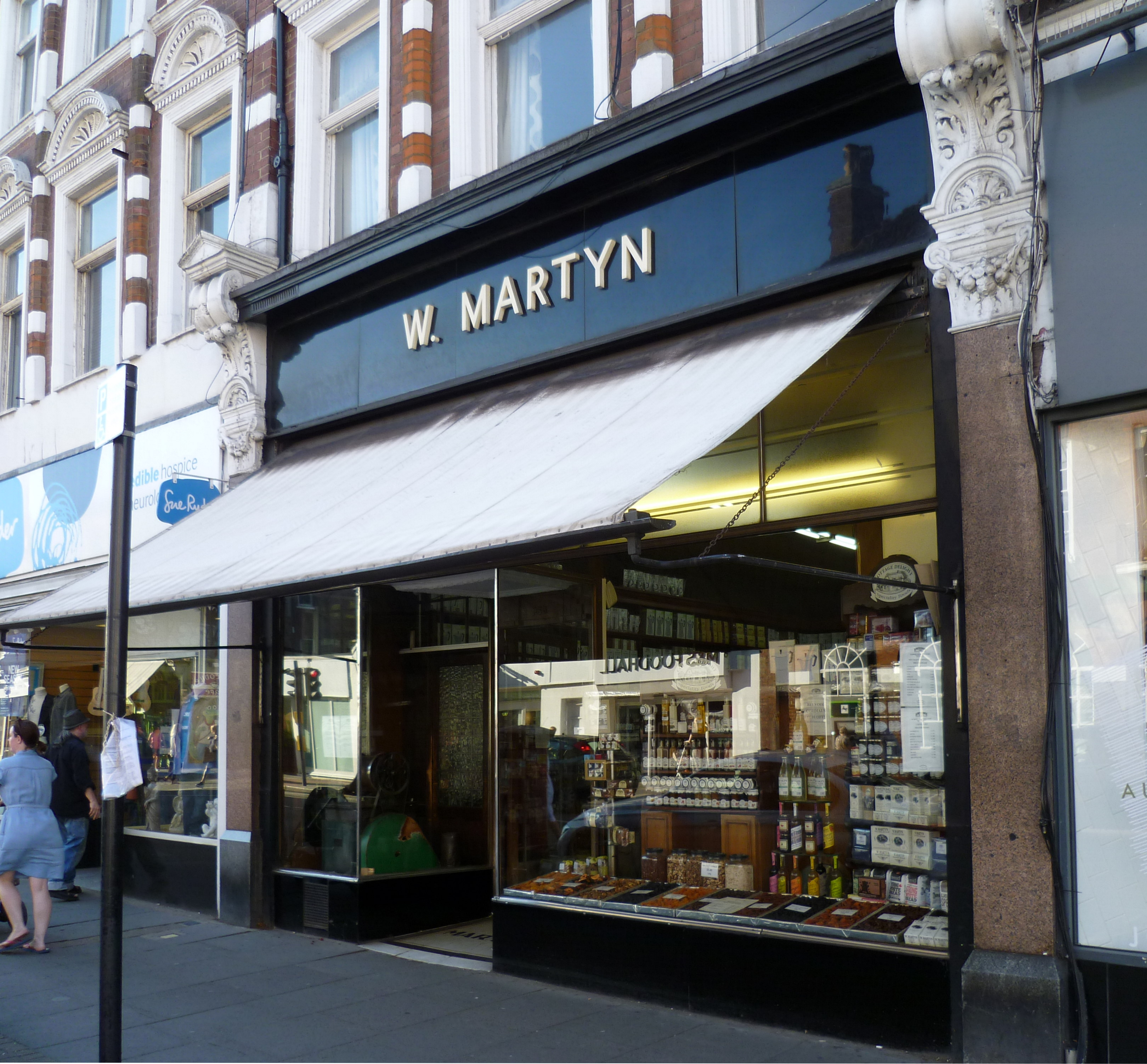
W. Martyn grocers shop

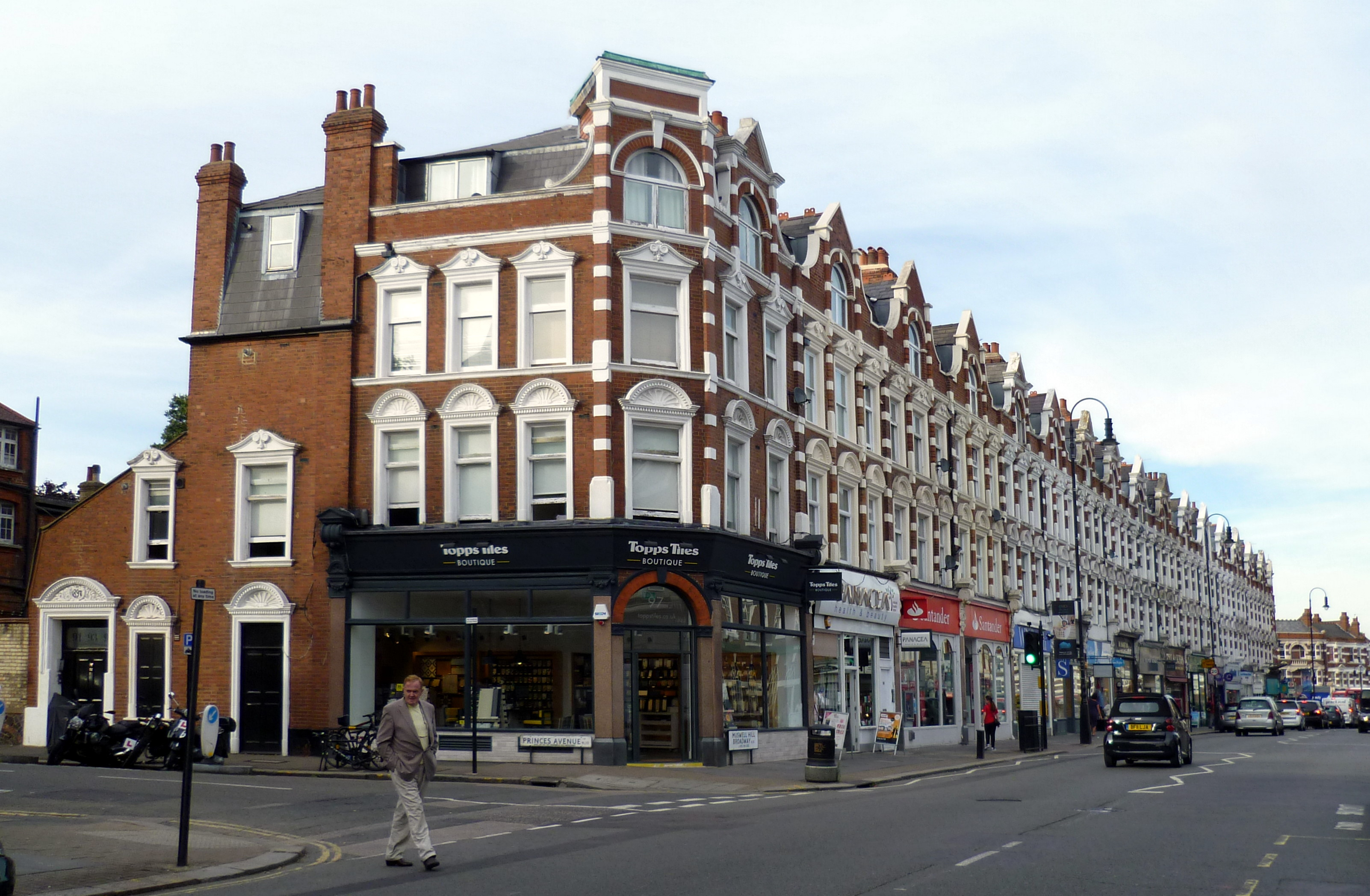
Queens Parade, Muswell Hill Broadway.

The W. Martyn grocers shop is a grade II listed building at 135 Queens Parade, Muswell Hill Broadway, London.

Queens Parade was built in 1897 by James Edmundson. The shop front dates from the 1930s. It was designated as a listed building with Historic England in 2009 as a "rare example of a late-Victorian or Edwardian grocery shop interior with matchboard panelling, mahogany shelving and counter and metal storage bins with mahogany lids".

== Gallery ==
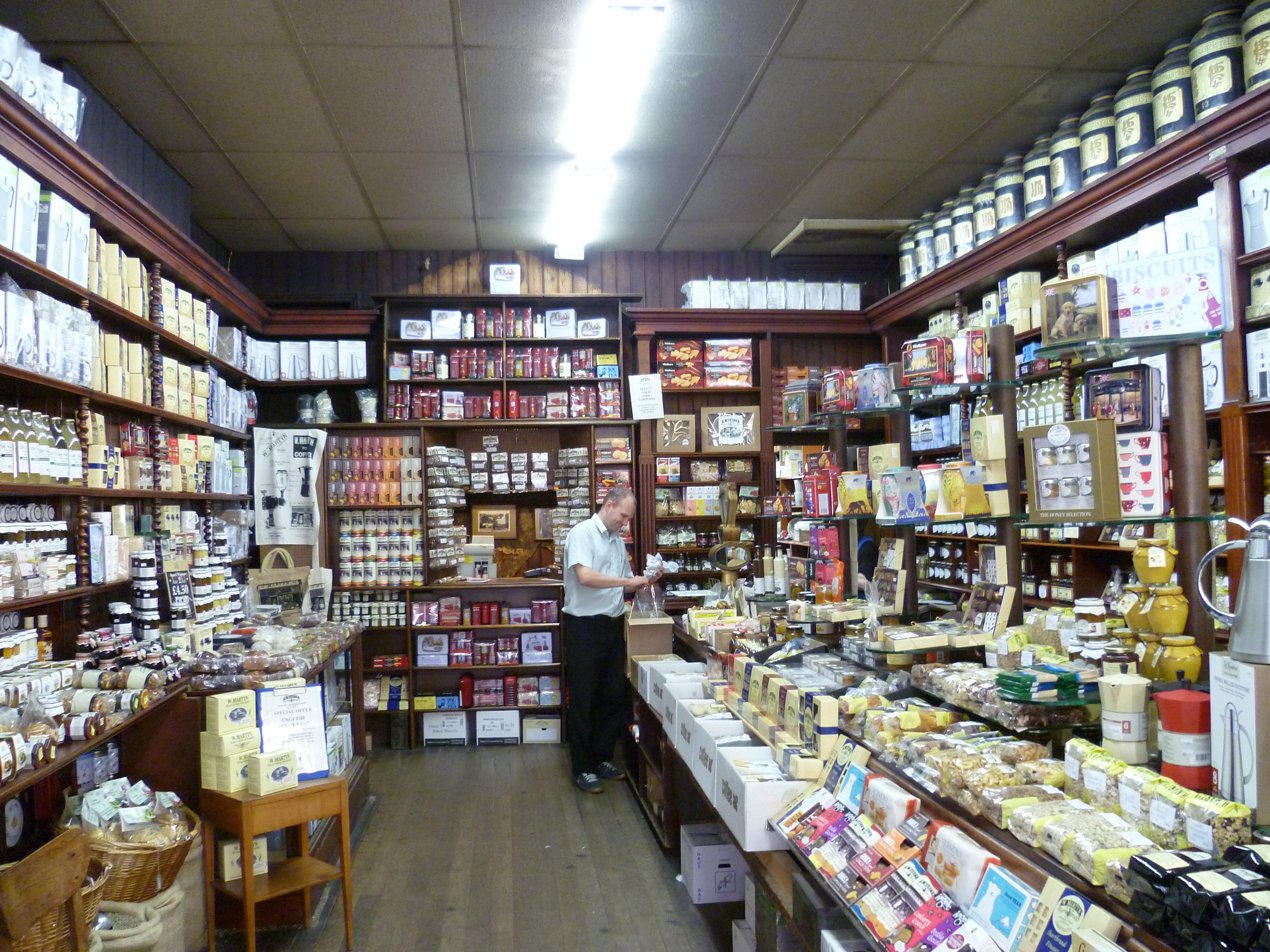
Interior

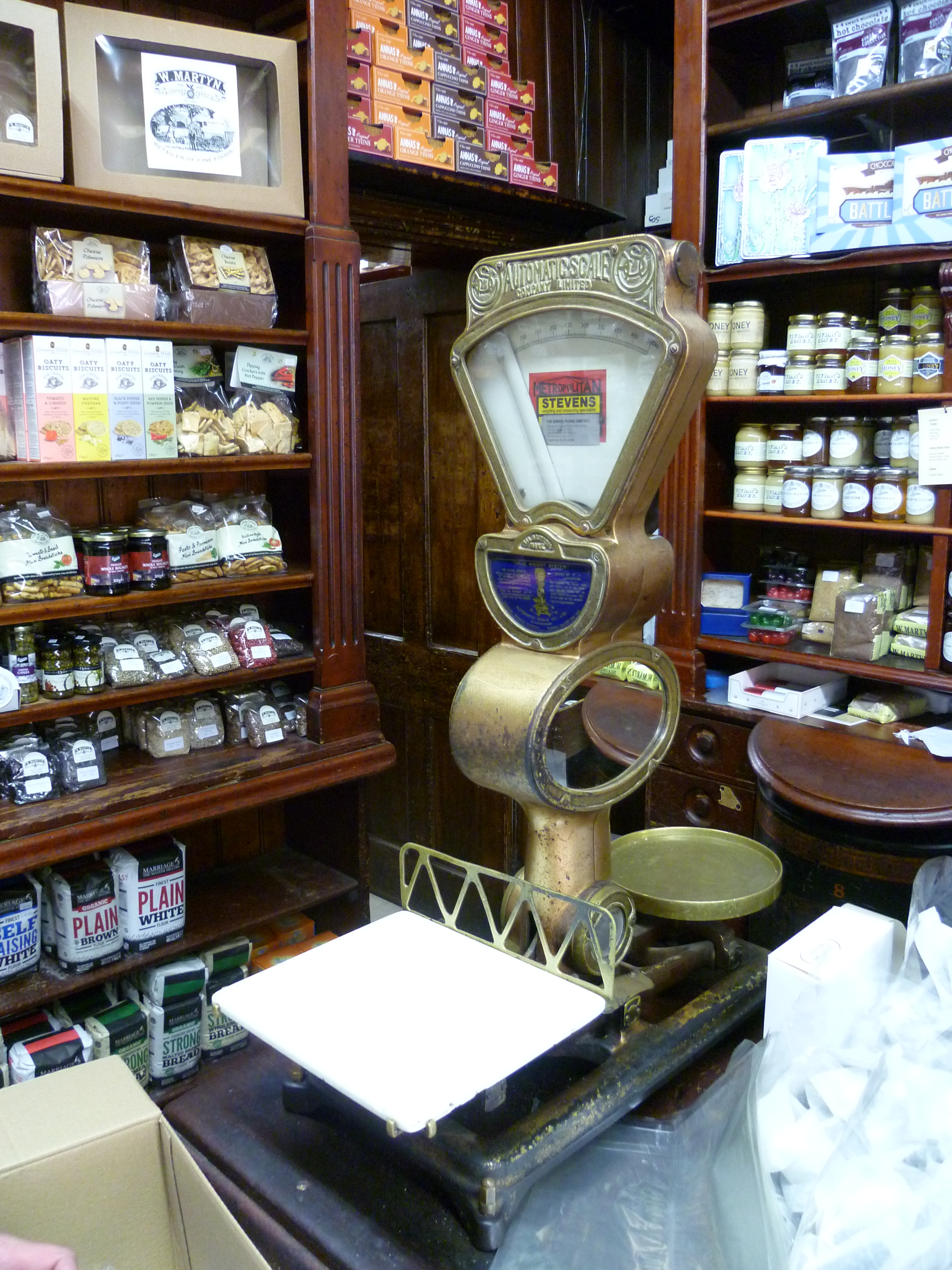
Weighing scales

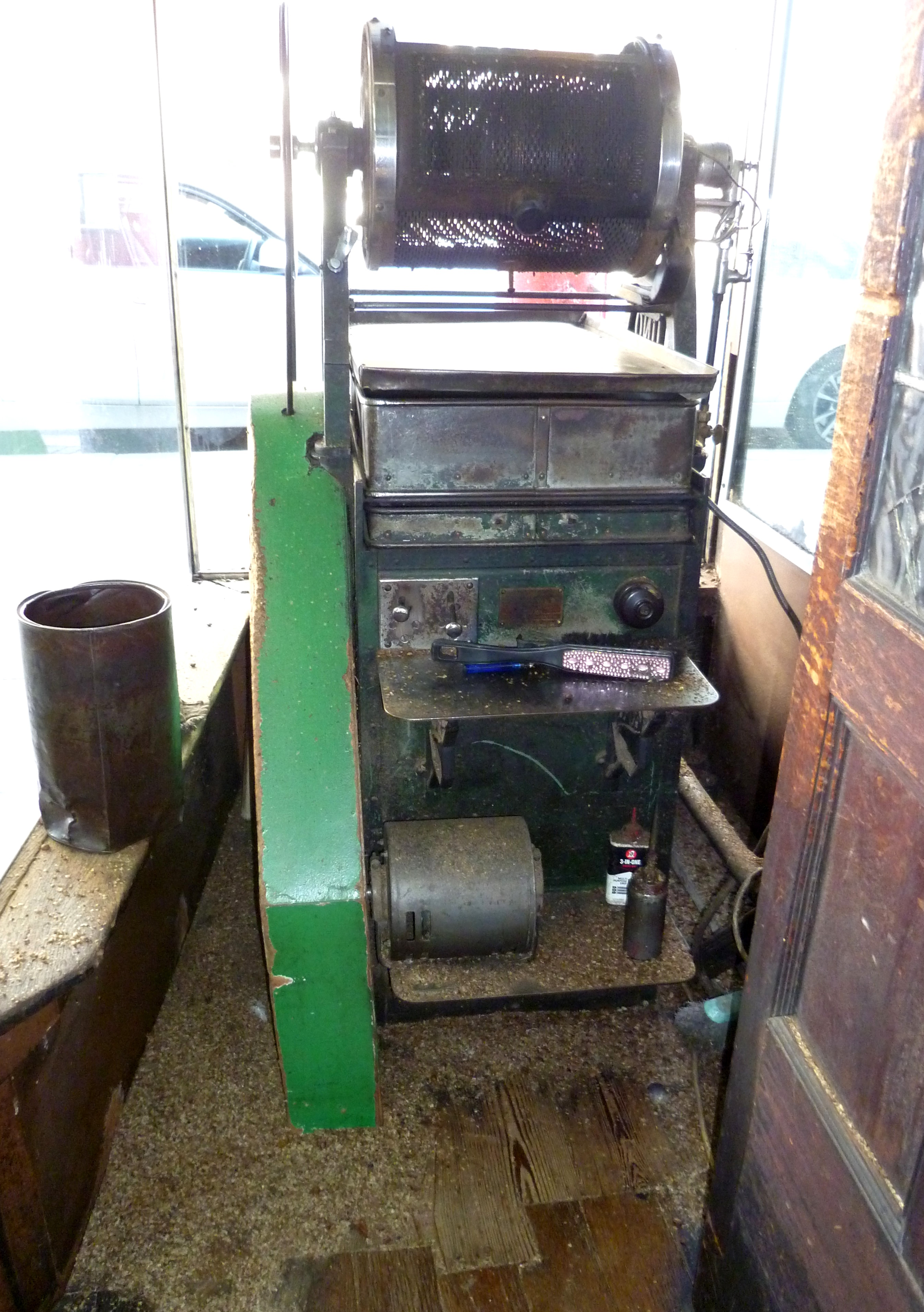
Coffee grinding machine

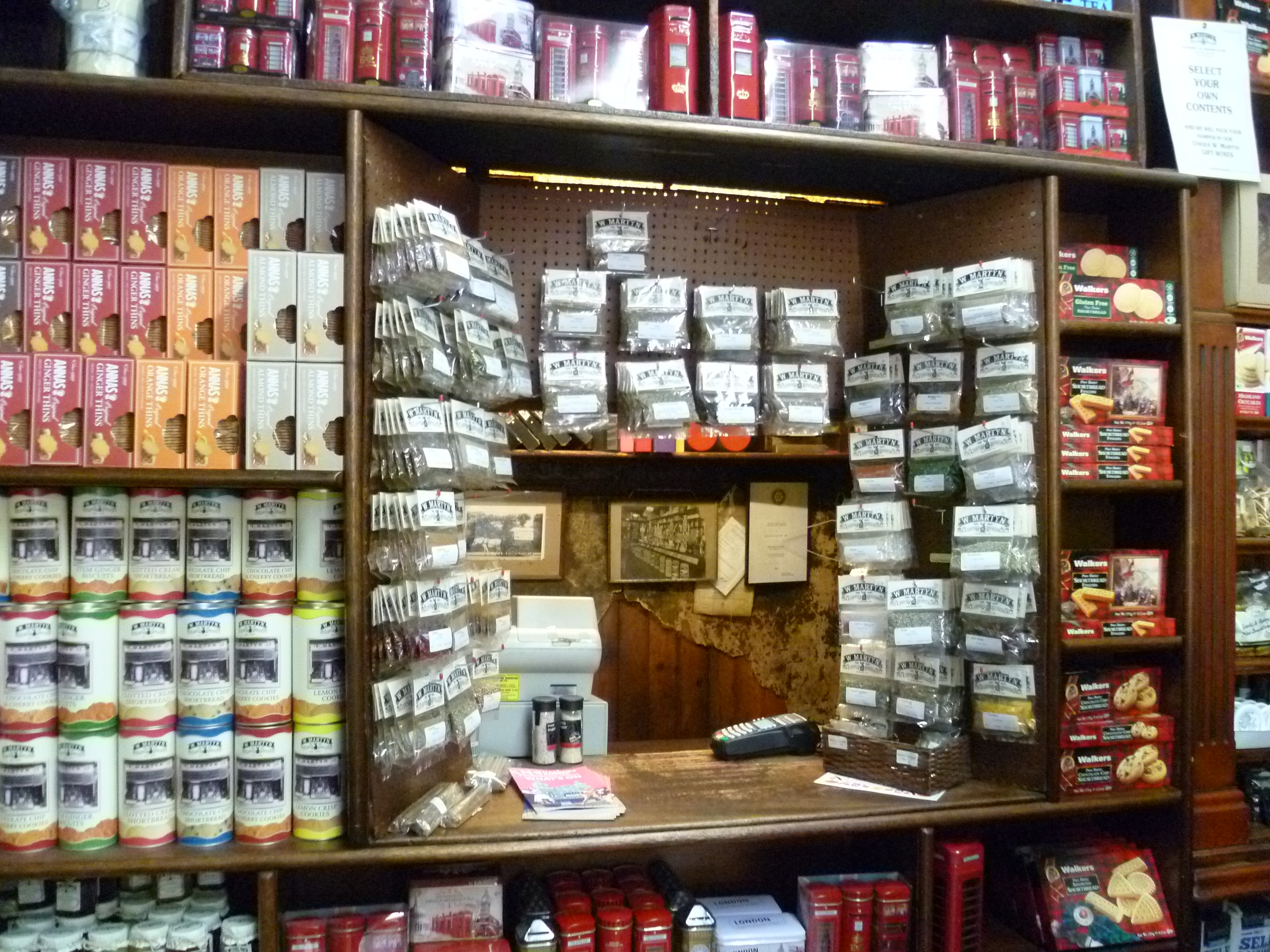
Serving hatch

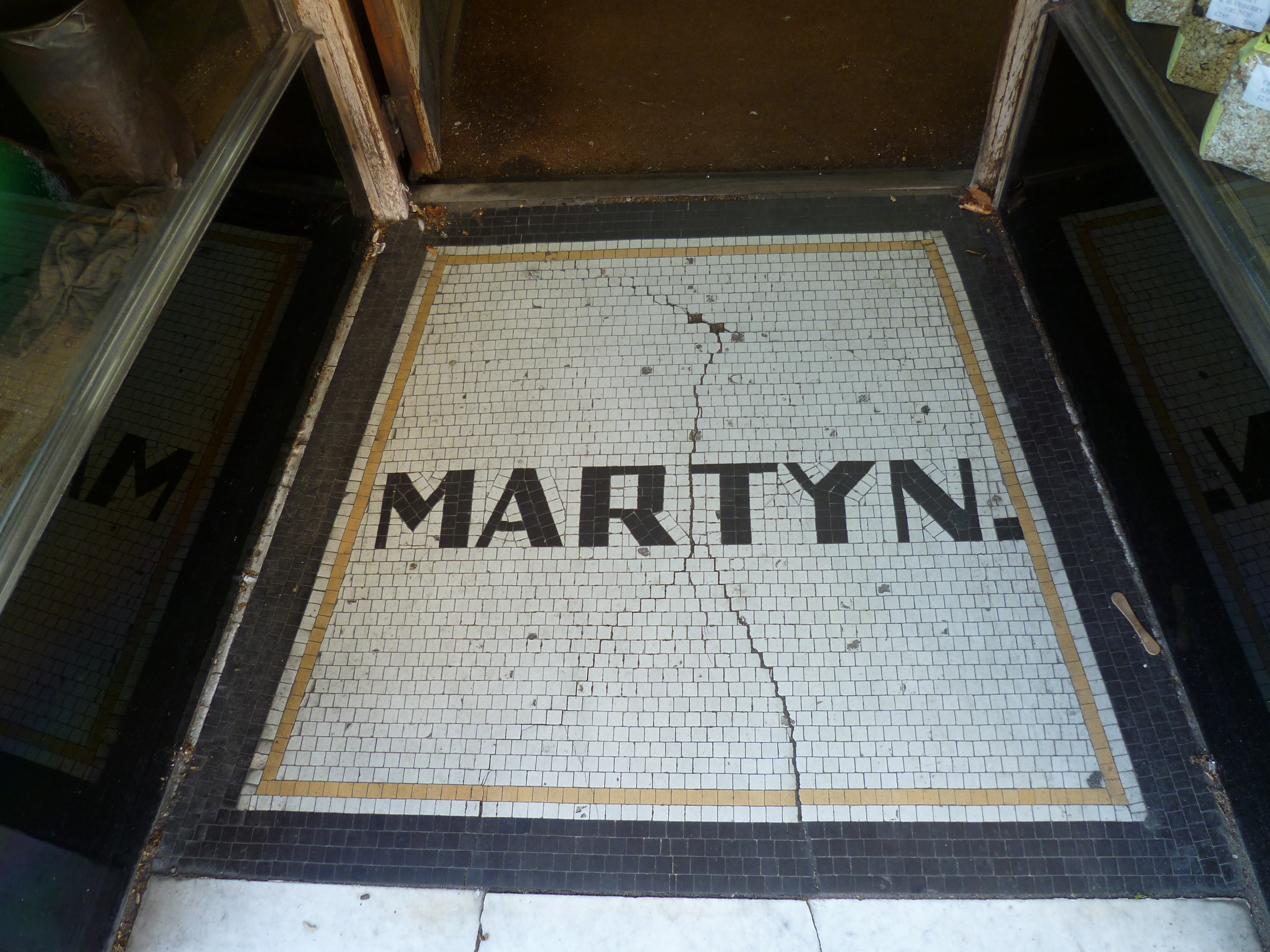
Entrance mosaic

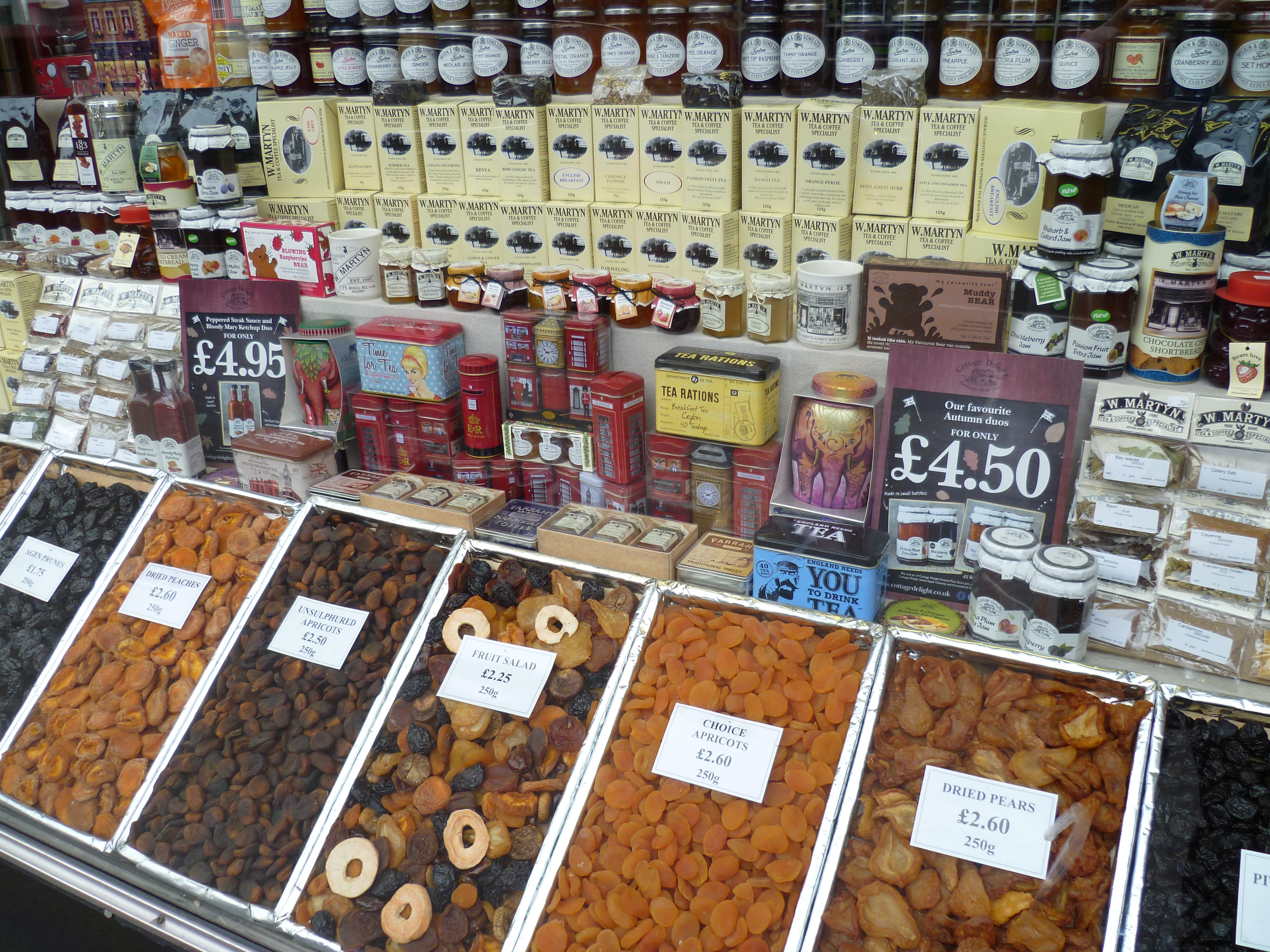
Window display
