= Christopher Bonham-Carter =

Royal Navy Rear Admiral (1907–1975)

Rear-Admiral Sir Christopher Bonham-Carter GCVO CB
- Born: 3 November 1907
- Died: 3 June 1975 (aged 67)
- Relatives: Bonham Carter family
- Military career
- Allegiance: United Kingdom
- Branch: Royal Navy
- Service years: 1921–1959
- Rank: Rear-Admiral
- Commands: HMS Glasgow (1955–56); 2nd Frigate Squadron (1949–51)
- Conflicts: Second World War
- Awards: Knight Grand Cross of the Royal Victorian Order; Companion of the Order of the Bath; Mentioned in Despatches
- Other work: Treasurer to the Duke of Edinburgh (1959–70)

Rear-Admiral Sir Christopher Douglas Bonham-Carter, GCVO, CB (3 November 1907 – 3 June 1975) was a Royal Navy officer and Treasurer to the Duke of Edinburgh from 1959 to 1970.

== Early life and naval career ==
Born a member of the Bonham-Carter family, he was educated at Elstree School and the Britannia Royal Naval College, Dartmouth. He entered the Royal Navy, becoming a captain in 1948, and rear-admiral in 1957.

He was mentioned in despatches in 1943. From 1949 to 1951 he was in command 2nd Frigate Squadron, and then was Naval Attache in Rome 1951 to 1953. After spending 1953 to 1955 at the Admiralty he became Commanding Officer of HMS Glasgow in 1955 and 1956. His last posting was as Chief of Staff Mediterranean (1957–1959).

== Treasurer to the Duke of Edinburgh ==
In 1959 Bonham-Carter joined the Household of the Duke of Edinburgh as Treasurer to the Duke of Edinburgh. In 1970 he was appointed Private Secretary, and retired from both positions at the end of that year. In 1961, during a Royal visit to Nepal, he was credited with sharing a tiger kill with Sir Michael Adeane in a royal tiger hunt. The task of shooting the tiger had fallen to him after the Queen had declined, the Duke of Edinburgh had been unable to do so due to having his trigger finger in a splint, and the then Foreign Secretary Alec Douglas-Home had missed twice.

He was appointed Extra Equerry in 1970. From 1971 until his death he was also Secretary and Registrar of the Order of Merit.

Bonham-Carter was made a Companion of the Order of the Bath in 1959, and a Commander of the Royal Victorian Order in 1962. He was advanced to Knight Commander of the Royal Victorian Order in 1968, and Knight Grand Cross of the Royal Victorian Order in 1970.

He is the grandfather of actor Crispin Bonham-Carter.

== See also ==
- Bonham Carter family
