= Golf Course Allotments =

Allotments in Muswell Hill, London, England

Coordinates: 51°36′16″N 0°08′05″W

The Golf Course Allotments are allotments in the Muswell Hill area of the London Borough of Haringey. At over 11.5 acres they are the second-largest allotment site in the borough, which also owns them. Like nearly all allotment sites in the borough it is (mostly) run by the site's association, the Golf Course Allotments Association (GCAA).

== History ==
The land was once farmland, as was most of this part of North London. Bluebell Wood, which is next door to the allotments, once formed part of an ancient wood called Tottenham Wood. It is possible that this same wood once covered the allotments.

In 1893 the Muswell Hill Golf Club was founded. The club had a course that covered the allotment site. During the First World War they were forced to give up the lease on part of the course for allotment gardening. The golf club never got the land back after the war, and the allotments have been there since.

The GCAA was originally founded in the 1940s as a local allotment and horticultural society with the betterment of allotment sites as an aim. Over time it focused on the Golf Course Allotments over others, subsequently changing its name to reflect this.

== The site today ==
Today the allotment has over 230 plots gardened by over 250 tenants. There is a shop for plot holders, a composting toilet, and a community hall. Throughout the year are events such as cafés and parties which raise funds to improve the site. The site is open to the public one day a year during the Summer Show. Normally held in early September, the Show is opened with the National Gardens Scheme.

As of 2026, the wait time for an allotment plot was four to five years.
