= Eden Primary School, Muswell Hill =

Coordinates: 51°35′42″N 0°9′14″W

Eden Primary School

Location
- 79 Creighton Avenue; Muswell Hill; London, N10 1NR; England

Information
- Type: Free school
- Religious affiliation: Jewish
- Established: 2011
- Local authority: Haringey
- Department for Education URN: 136808 Tables
- Ofsted: Reports
- Head Teacher: Helen Graff
- Gender: Coeducational
- Age: 4 to 11
- Enrolment: 205
- Website: http://www.edenprimary.org.uk/

Eden Primary School is a cross-communal Jewish Primary school or Jewish day school in Muswell Hill, in the borough of Haringey, North London, UK, catering for children aged 4 to 11.

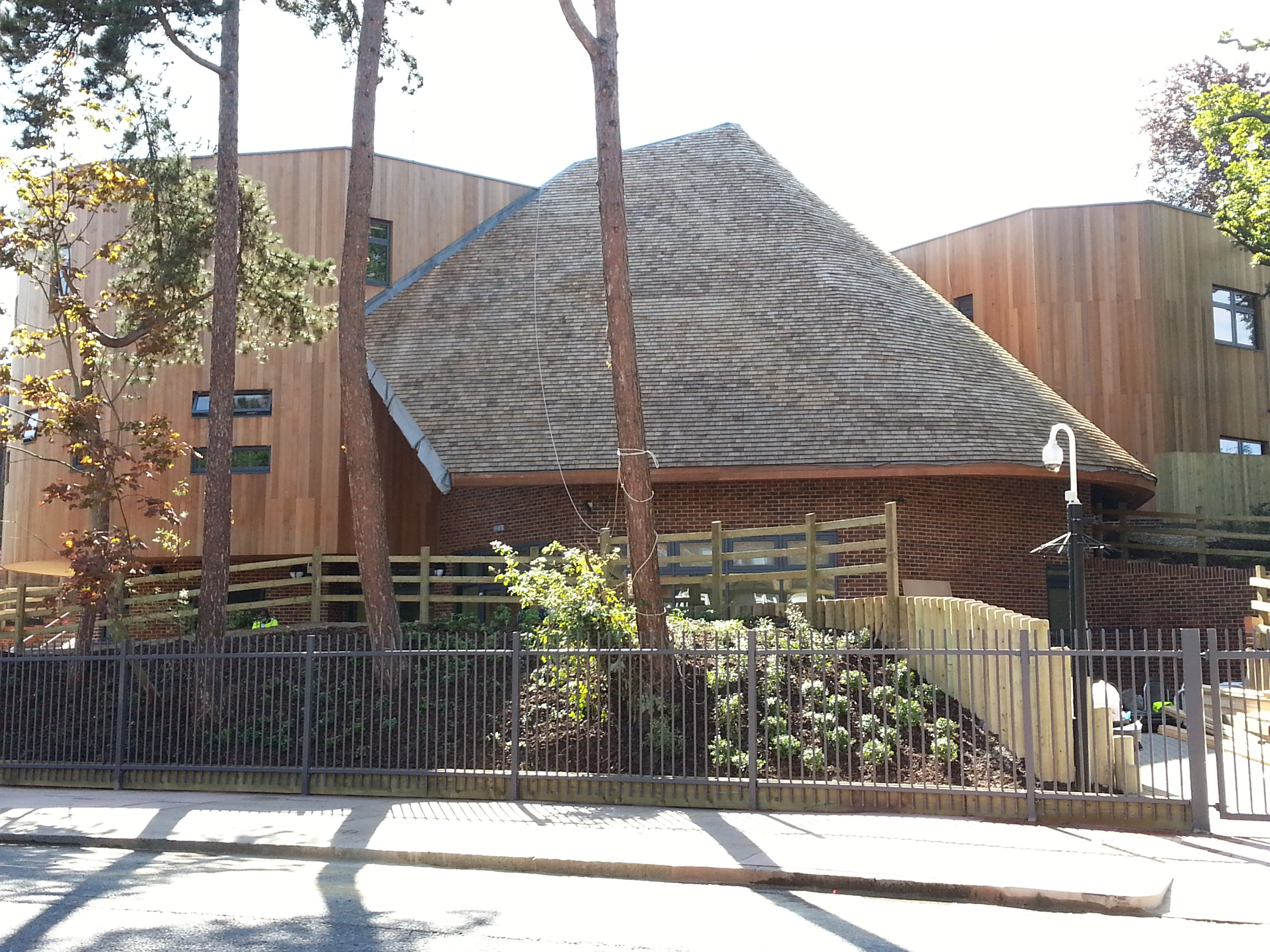
Eden Primary

It is distinctive for actively welcoming children irrespective of their religious background. It opened in September 2011. Eden Primary is the first Primary Free School to be commissioned by the UK Government under the free school programme. Of those initial Free Schools whose costs were released by the UK Government, it received the largest amount of investment, at £6.2 million

The school's original working name was 'Haringey Jewish Primary School', but the permanent name of Eden was adopted in order to convey the school's ethos more clearly. Eden is a small, single-form-entry school, admitting 30 children into Reception each year. The school's founding headteacher was Jo Sassienie. Its first year was spent in temporary accommodation, and it moved to permanent premises in September 2012. The cost of construction was budgeted and delivered at £2.6 million. 323 applications to open Free Schools were received by the Department for Education in the first year of operation, out of which 24 schools opened in 2011.

Admissions Policy: like all faith-based Free Schools Eden admits 50% of places on the basis of proximity, not faith. The other 50% of places are offered on the basis of Jewish practice. As with other state-maintained schools, the admissions process is run by the Local Education Authority.

Eden Primary's building received planning permission on 13 September 2011. It was erected between September 2011 and September 2012 by Rydon Construction. It is a cedar-clad construction, designed to emphasize the school's interest in nature.

The school provides both a general and a Jewish education, and also teaches Modern Hebrew as a spoken language. Jewish Studies and Hebrew make up approximately 17% of the total curriculum time.

The school's headteacher is Helen Graff. The Chair of Trustees is Steve Miller.
