= Alexandra Park Racecourse =

Former horse racing venue in London

Coordinates: 51°35′35.37″N 0°7′20.16″W

Alexandra Park
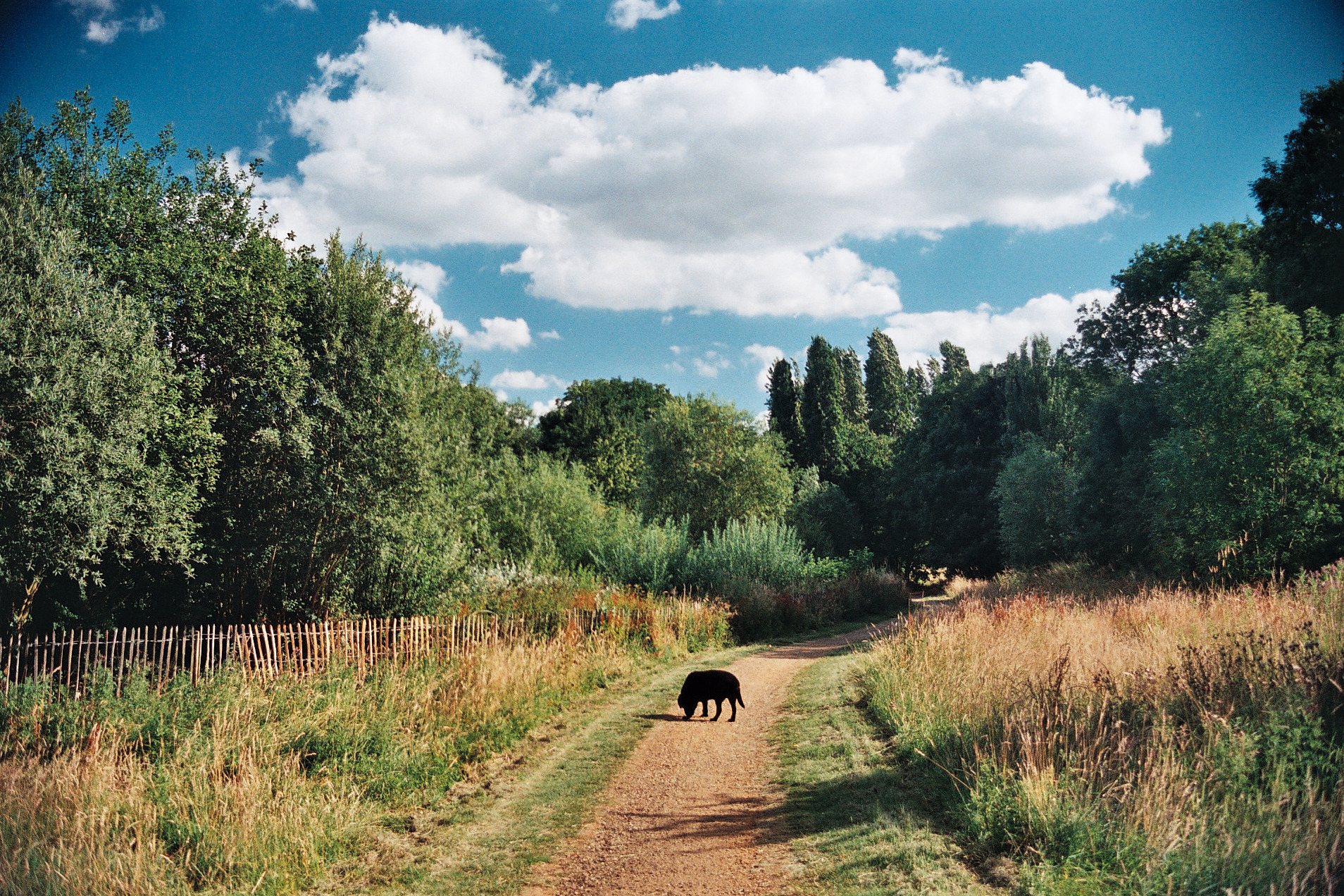
- The site of the course in 2010, looking from the site of the old starting gate towards the pan handle
- Location: London
- Owned by: Defunct
- Date opened: 30 June 1868
- Date closed: 8 September 1970
- Course type: Flat
- Notable races: London Cup

Alexandra Park Racecourse, known to Londoners as Ally Pally, was a horse racing venue in Alexandra Park, London, England; it was colloquially known as the Frying Pan on account of its shape. It opened on 30 June 1868 and closed 102 years later on 8 September 1970. It is now incorporated into the park, with a sports pitch in the centre of the racetrack oval.

== Layout ==
The course is described as "pear-shaped with a stick attached", hence the nickname the "Frying Pan". Races were run over three distances only: 5 furlongs (1,000 m), 1 mile 160 yards (1755 m), and 1 mile 5 furlongs (2,600 m). The going was often firm or hard, though heavy rain could render the turf treacherously slippery.

Races of 1 mile 160 yards, and 1 mile 5 furlongs started in front of the stands; the horses ran down the straight and completed either one or two circuits of the round course before returning up the straight to the finish - round the frying pan and up the handle as it was described. The only other starting gate, out of sight from the stands, was for races over 5 furlongs. There was a right handed bend soon after the 5 furlongs start, followed by a home straight of 3 furlongs, which gave horses drawn with high numbers a big advantage. There was a steady climb to the winning post. There was an ornate Victorian grandstand and cast-iron railings.

== Races ==
Monday evening meetings were a regular feature of Alexandra Park's programme. Evening racing started in 1955, and the course's popularity grew temporarily. The meetings were often televised by the BBC. The course's most important races were the London Cup (later transferred to Newbury), the Middlesex Plate, the Flying 2-year-old Plate and the 5-furlong Southgate Stakes.

== Critical opinion ==
Alexandra Park has been described as "the quirkiest course in Britain ... celebrated for its atmosphere but reviled for the treacherous twists and turns." Among its biggest supporters was the racing pundit, John McCririck. "Part of me died when Alexandra Park closed in 1970," he said, "I’ve never recovered from it." McCririck spoke of his wish to be able to afford to rebuild the course and asked that his ashes be scattered at the furlong post. McCririck died in July 2019 and his wife stated her intention to carry out this request.

The course was not, however, universally popular: spectator viewing, for instance, was markedly restricted. The five-furlong start was obscured by trees, and neither were there uninterrupted views of the round course. Jockeys were not always complimentary about the track either: Willie Carson is quoted as saying that Alexandra Park "wanted bombing".

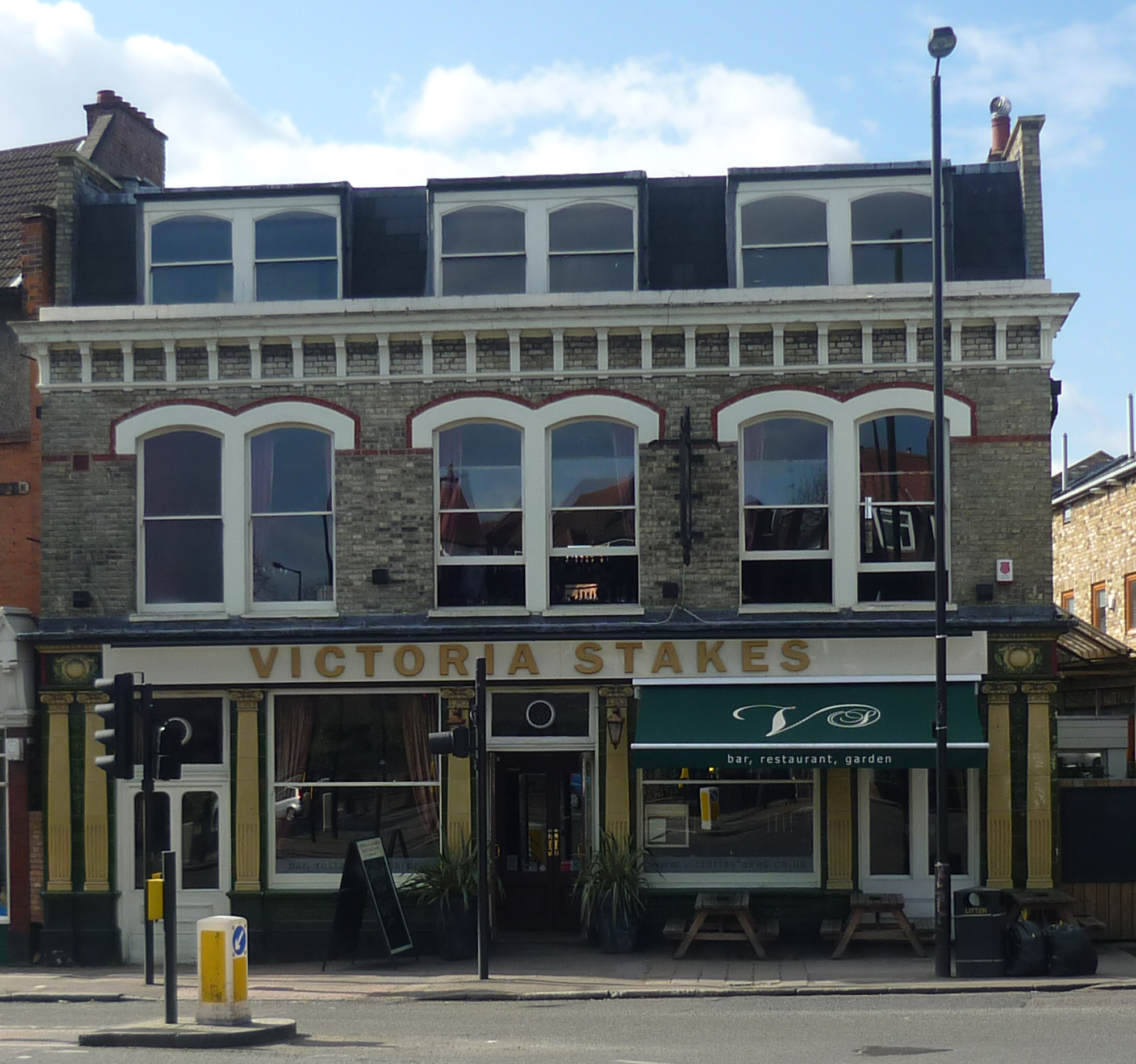
Victoria Stakes, a pub in the vicinity named after a race at the course

== Recent history ==
The rails and the outline of the course were still in existence in 1999 when a plan was hatched by a company called FFK Racing to resurrect it. Proposals were made to the British Horseracing Board but nothing ever came to fruition. In 2011, a group called Riding in Haringey planned an equestrian centre.

The centre of the racecourse has been a cricket ground since the 19th century and used by Alexandra Park CC from the early 1900s. Local football team Alexandra Park FC also plays at the Racecourse Ground. The former track may be walked around. The course is also commemorated in the local pub names the Starting Gate and the Victoria Stakes.
