= Crispin Bonham-Carter =

British actor (born 1969)

- Born: 23 September 1969 (age 57); Colchester, Essex, England
- Occupations: Actor and theatre director, then teacher and school administrator
- Years active: 1992–2007
- Spouse: Katherine Julian Dawnay
- Children: 4
- Relatives: Bonham Carter family

Crispin Daniel Bonham-Carter (born 23 September 1969) is an English retired actor, theatre director, and educator. He was appointed Assistant Head at the Queen Elizabeth's School, Barnet, in 2019. His best known acting role is that of Mr. Bingley in the 1995 television miniseries Pride and Prejudice. His work directing young actors at LAMDA, the Guildhall and the Royal Central School of Speech and Drama and working at the National Youth Theatre inspired him to train as a teacher. He is a member of the Bonham Carter family.

== Early life and education ==
Bonham-Carter is the son of Peter Bonham-Carter and Clodagh Greenwood, and the grandson of Rear Admiral Sir Christopher Bonham-Carter, member of the Bonham-Carter family. He is a third cousin once removed of actress Helena Bonham Carter and her brother, Edward.

He was educated at Stancliffe Hall prep school in Derbyshire then Glenalmond College, and graduated in 1992 from the University of St Andrews with a degree in classics. In 2011, he represented his former university in a special series of University Challenge.

== Careers ==
Bonham-Carter starred alongside Ewan McGregor in the 1993 BBC period drama Scarlet and Black, playing Rachel Weisz's suitor. He starred in the TV sitcom Honey for Tea in 1994. He appeared as Mr Bingley in the 1995 BBC adaptation of Pride and Prejudice, alongside Colin Firth. He played Greg in Bridget Jones's Diary in 2001. That same year, he appeared on season 4 of Absolutely Fabulous as a gardener named Jago Balfour, who was commissioned to redesign the back garden.

Bonham trained as a teacher from 2007 to 2008, and then worked for 10 years teaching English and Classics at Alexandra Park School, a comprehensive school in north London. In 2019, he was appointed an Assistant Head at Queen Elizabeth's School, Barnet—his dream job.

== Filmography ==
Year	Title	Role	Notes
1992	Howards End	Albert Fussell	Film debut
1993	Scarlet and Black	Comte de Croisenois	Miniseries
1994	Honey for Tea	Charlie Chadwick	
1995	Pride & Prejudice	Mr. Bingley	Miniseries
1995	Annie: A Royal Adventure!	Rupert Hogbottom	TV movie
1996	Highlander	Danny Cimoli	Episode: The Immortal Cimoli
1997	Cadfael	Miles Coliar	Episode: The Rose Rent
1997	Catherine Cookson’s The Rag Nymph	Bernard Thompson	
1998	Game On	Archie	
1998	Basil	Ralph	
1998	Wuthering Heights	Edgar	TV movie
2001	Bridget Jones's Diary	Greg	
2001	Victoria & Albert	Lord Frederick Standish	TV Serial
2001	Absolutely Fabulous	Jago Balfour	
2001	Relic Hunter	Preston Bailey	Episode: The Royal Ring
2001	Murder Rooms: Mysteries of the Real Sherlock Holmes	Reuben Proctor	Miniseries
2002	ER	Passenger	Episode: Chaos Theory
2002	The Project	Charles	TV movie
2002	Relic Hunter	Preston Bailey	Episode: Fountain of Youth
2004	Rosemary & Thyme	Gavin Patterson	Episode: The Gongoozlers
2006	Suez: A Very British Crisis	Anthony Nutting	TV movie
2006	Casino Royale	Hot Room Doctor #2	Last film before becoming a teacher

=== Music video ===
Title	Year	Performer	Album	Ref.
"Uptown Girl"	2001	Westlife	World of Our Own	
