= National Garden Scheme =

Charity fundraising event

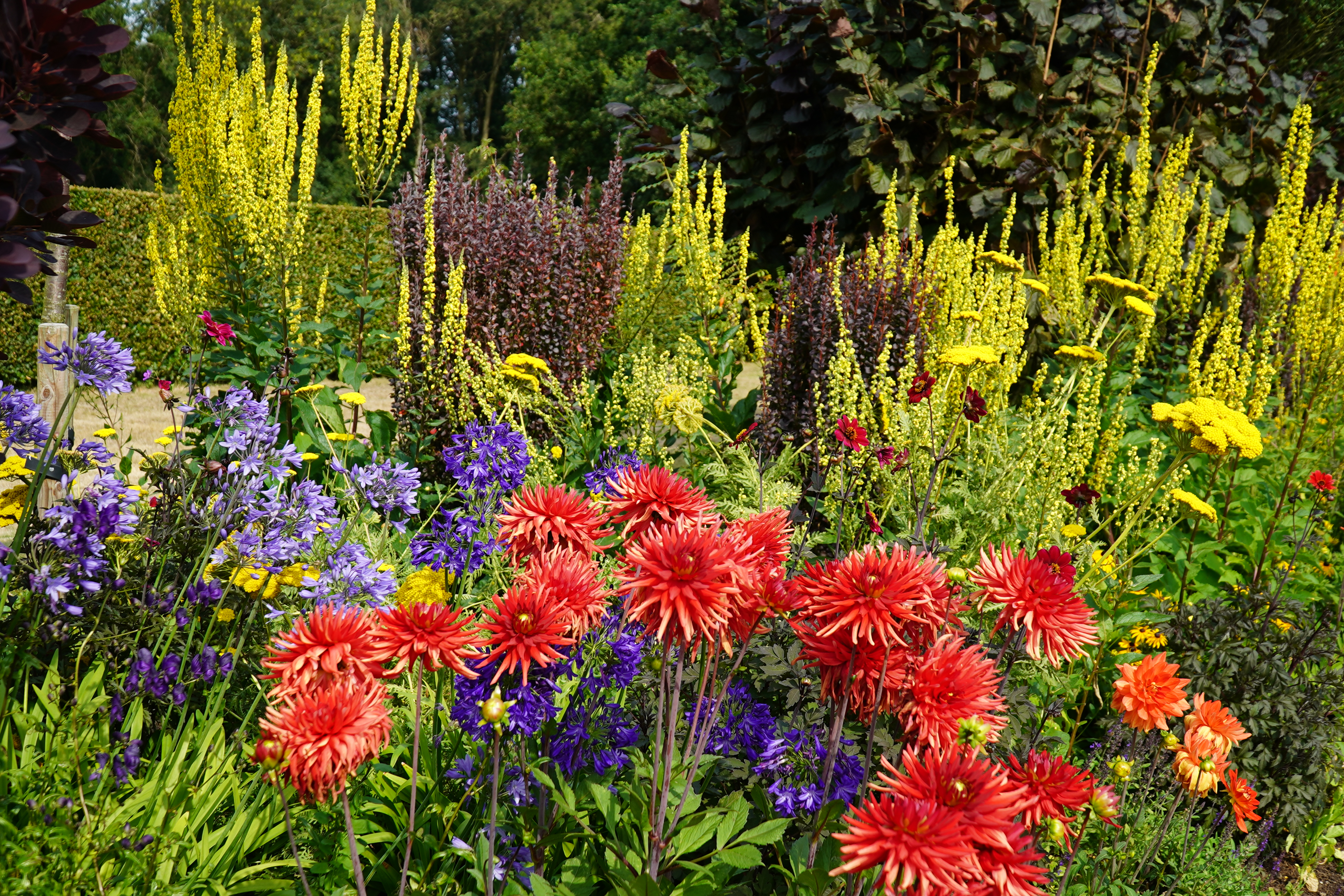
Summer border at Thakeham Place, West Sussex

The National Garden Scheme is a charity fund-raising scheme involving access to privately owned gardens in England, Northern Ireland, Wales, and the Channel Islands on selected dates for charity. It was founded in 1927 with the aim of "opening gardens of quality, character and interest to the public for charity". The scheme has raised over £78 million since it began, and normally opens over 3,500 gardens a year.

Volunteer County Organisers are responsible for vetting gardens to make sure they are of sufficient interest. When the scheme began 609 private gardens were opened and £8,191 was raised. A small number of the original "1927" gardens still participate in the Scheme, while many more have joined. Over 3,700 gardens were due to open in 2020 but the impact of COVID-19 meant that most openings were cancelled. However, new online virtual garden tours were introduced.

To help boost funds after COVID-19, the National Garden Scheme set up an annual fundraising event called The Great British Garden Party, encouraging everyone to enjoy outdoor spaces while raising money for the charity and championed by the charity's then President, Dame Mary Berry.

The National Garden Scheme funds projects which promote gardens and gardening as therapy, and in 2017, launched an annual Gardens and Health Week to raise awareness of the topic.

== The Garden Visitor's Handbook ==
Visitor information is published in a publication called The Garden Visitor's Handbook (formerly the Yellow Book). There is another Yellow Book for the separate Scotland's Gardens scheme.

== History ==
Despite its title, the National Garden Scheme originated from a concern with the welfare of people rather than the cultivation of gardens.

The widespread opening of private gardens to raise funds for nursing charities began as part of the National Memorial appeal for Queen Alexandra, following her death in 1925. The appeal was made on behalf of the Queen's Institute of District Nursing (QNI). The idea of opening private gardens to the public was proposed by Miss Elsie Wagg, a member of the QNI Council, in a letter to the head of the Memorial Appeal in October 1926. Her proposal was referred to the Women's National Committee of the Memorial appeal, which organised its implementation in time for Whitsuntide 1927.

The gardens that opened during the first year were predominantly large country gardens associated with stately homes, manor houses, castles and great halls. Nearly all were privately owned, and most had not previously been open to the general public. King George V agreed to open the gardens at Sandringham, encouraging other owners to participate, including those at Blenheim Palace, Chatsworth and Hatfield House. The scheme also included gardens associated with prominent gardeners, including William Robinson's garden at Gravetye Manor and Miss Ellen Willmott's garden at Warley Place.

The Women's National Committee, led by Lady Georgiana Mure and Mrs Millicent Stobart, not only recruited gardens but also arranged special excursions with railway and char-à-banc companies. This was important at a time when private motor cars were owned by relatively few people. The Times published weekly lists of gardens due to open, while Country Life and local newspapers provided further coverage.

The scheme proved very popular and was extended beyond Whitsuntide until the end of September. In 1927, 609 gardens opened, some on more than one occasion. Almost 200,000 people visited, typically paying an admission fee of one shilling and £8,191 was raised for district nursing. Following this success, the scheme was made permanent and responsibility for it was transferred from the National Memorial to the Queen's Institute, where it continued as a means of raising funds for district nursing.

To administer what was initially known as the Gardens of England and Wales Scheme, the Queen's Institute established a Garden Sub-Committee, headed by Hilda, Duchess of Richmond and Gordon. Its members included Miss Elsie Wagg, Lady Georgiana Mure, Mrs Frank Stobart, Mrs Pepyat Evans, Sir William Lawrence of the Royal Horticultural Society and Avray Tipping of Country Life. Honorary County Organisers were appointed throughout England and Wales to encourage and support garden owners and assist with local publicity.

By 1939, the number of gardens opening each year had more than doubled, to over 1,200. The scheme continued during the Second World War, although on a reduced scale, with approximately half of the counties maintaining garden openings. After the war, the scheme adapted to the conditions of the early post-war period, including petrol shortages and rationing.

The Automobile Association (AA) and Royal Automobile Club (RAC) also supported the scheme in its early years. Their patrol officers, who at the time often travelled by motorcycle, carried copies of the Gardens Scheme guide in their sidecars. Country Life continued to support the scheme and, between 1932 and 1939, published an illustrated guidebook with a foreword by the Country Life architectural editor Christopher Hussey. The guidebooks published by the scheme between 1940 and 1948 were produced in an economical format, reflecting wartime conditions; from 1949, the publication adopted the now-familiar yellow cover.

In 1948, responsibility for district nursing was transferred from the Queen's Institute to the newly established National Health Service, though the Institute retained responsibility for district nurses' pensions. At around the same time, the National Trust and the Royal Horticultural Society established a joint committee to acquire and restore important historic gardens for the nation. Following an approach by the National Trust to the Queen's Institute, it was agreed in 1949 that the Trust would receive a share of the Garden Scheme's proceeds, in return for providing support to the Scheme. The first garden acquired by the National Trust with assistance from the Scheme was Hidcote in Gloucestershire. Hidcote had opened for the Garden Scheme since 1928.

Development as an independent charity

By the scheme's fiftieth anniversary in 1977, approximately 1,400 gardens were opening each year and annual income had risen to nearly £100,000. Although the National Garden Scheme remained constitutionally part of the Queen's Institute, it had developed a distinct identity and become a national fundraising organisation.

In 1979, the Queen's Institute recognised that the scheme had acquired sufficient national stature to operate independently. In 1980, the National Gardens Scheme Charitable Trust was established, with Queen Elizabeth, the Queen Mother, as its patron. From the same year, garden owners were able to nominate an additional charity to receive a share of the proceeds from their garden opening. By the early 1980s, the amount allocated to the Queen's Institute exceeded its requirements for the work supported by the scheme and from 1984, funds were therefore also distributed to Macmillan Cancer Support. In 1986, the Gardener's Sunday organisation merged with the National Garden Scheme, bringing elderly gardeners and their dependants among the beneficiaries. In 1998, three further charities were added: Marie Curie, Help the Hospices (now Hospice UK) and Crossroads (now Carers Trust).

Changing nature of the gardens

The character of the gardens opening under the scheme has changed considerably over its history. Before the Second World War, the scheme was dominated by large country gardens, generally of three acres or more, often associated with substantial houses and estates. Although grand gardens, including some that opened in 1927, continue to participate, the majority of gardens opening today are small or medium-sized. The scheme has also expanded to include a wide variety of urban and suburban gardens as well as allotments and hospice gardens. This diversification has enabled the scheme to appeal to a broader range of visitors and has increased the number and geographical spread of gardens participating. The National Garden Scheme now opens approximately 3,500 gardens each year in England, Wales, Northern Ireland and The Channel Islands, continuing to raise funds for nursing and health charities. In 2027, it will mark its centenary.

== See also ==
- Scotland's Gardens
- Golf Course Allotments is an example of a site opened each year to the public.
