= St James Church, Muswell Hill =

Church in London, England

Coordinates: 51°35′21″N 0°8′43″W

St James, Muswell Hill
- Parish Church of St James
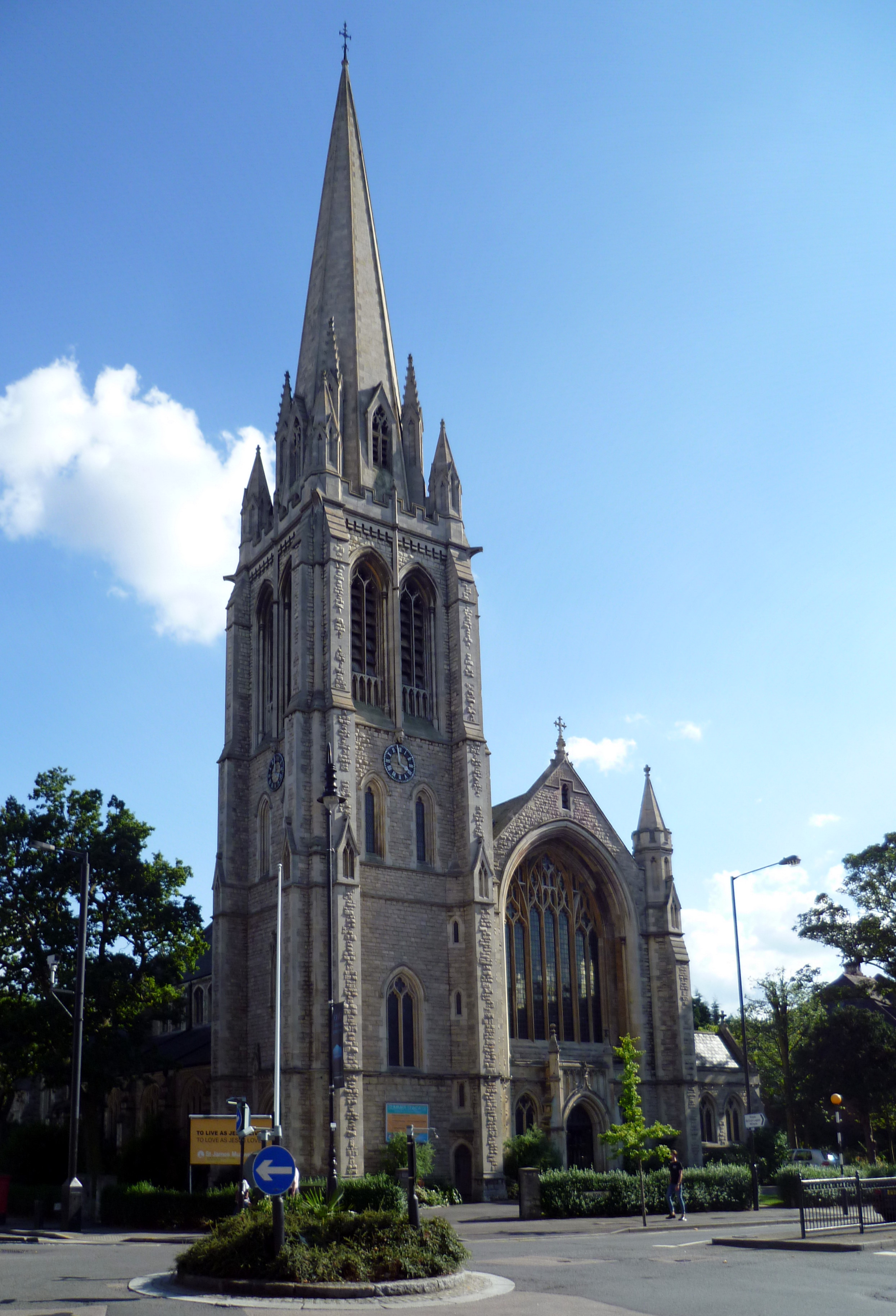
- St James, Muswell Hill
- Location: St James Lane, Muswell Hill, London N10 3DB
- Country: England
- Denomination: Church of England
- Churchmanship: Evangelical
- Website: www.st-james.org.uk

History
- Consecrated: 1842/1902

Architecture
- Architect: Samuel Angell J. S. Alder
- Architectural type: Perpendicular Gothic
- Groundbreaking: 1900
- Completed: 1911

Specifications
- Height: 179 ft (55 m)

Administration
- Province: Canterbury
- Diocese: London
- Archdeaconry: Hampstead
- Deanery: West Haringey
- Parish: Muswell Hill

Clergy
- Vicar: Rev Chris Green

St James Church, Muswell Hill, is a large Anglican church in London, known as "the Church on the Hill".

== History ==
The original building, designed by Samuel Angell, was consecrated in 1842 and extended in 1874. A new church was designed by J. S. Alder in 1898, with the foundation stone for the current building being laid in 1900. The completed church was consecrated by the Bishop of London (Rev. Arthur Winnington-Ingram) on 30 June 1902.

The building was gutted by World War II bombing, and the restored church was rededicated in 1952. The church centre's foundation stone was laid on 20 May 1994 and can be viewed in the bookshop.

The church spire was completed in 1910; the site of the church itself is at over 300 feet above sea level. With its tall tower and spire, the church stands at 179 feet tall.

A church primary school was completed nearby in 1850; its later replacement is sited on Woodside Avenue.

== Vicars ==
- 1842 – 1846 John Jackson (later bishop of London)
- 1846 – 1876 James Browell
- 1876 – 1894 Ernest Peter Cachemaille
- 1894 – 1912 James Shearer Whichelow
- 1912 – 1931 Arthur Mercer
- 1931 – 1958 Ernest Ernold Dunn (Prebendary of St Pauls)
- 1958 – 1966 Norman Harold Bainbridge
- 1967 – 1977 William Sidney Allam (Prebendary of St Pauls)
- 1978 – 1992 Michael Bunker (Prebendary of St Pauls)
- 1993 – 2007 Alex Ross
- 2008 – 2013 Kim Swithinbank
- 2014 – present Christopher Green

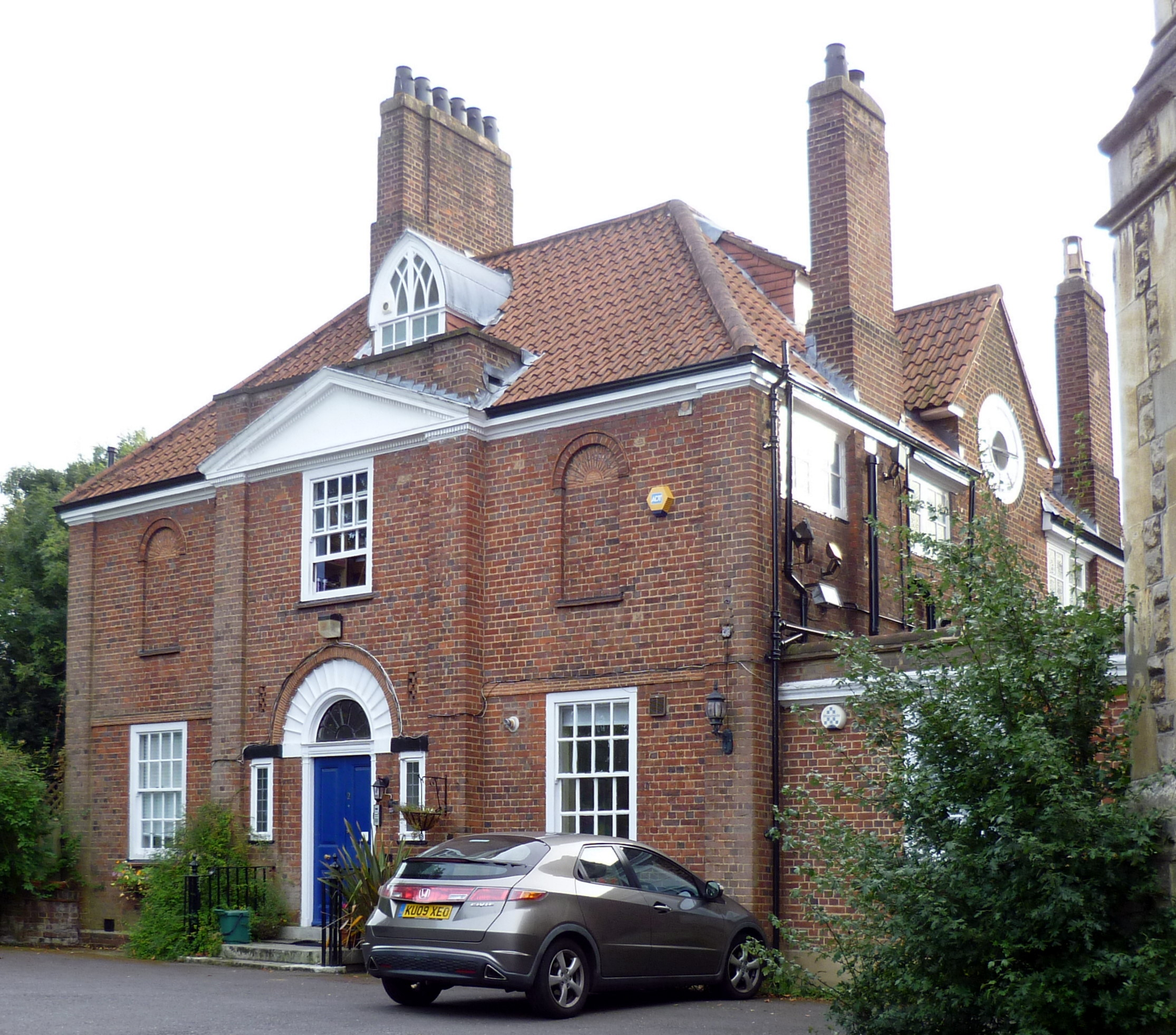
The grade II listed vicarage to the rear of the church
