= Muswell Hill Baptist Church =

Church in Muswell Hill, London, England

Coordinates: 51°35′30″N 0°08′28″W

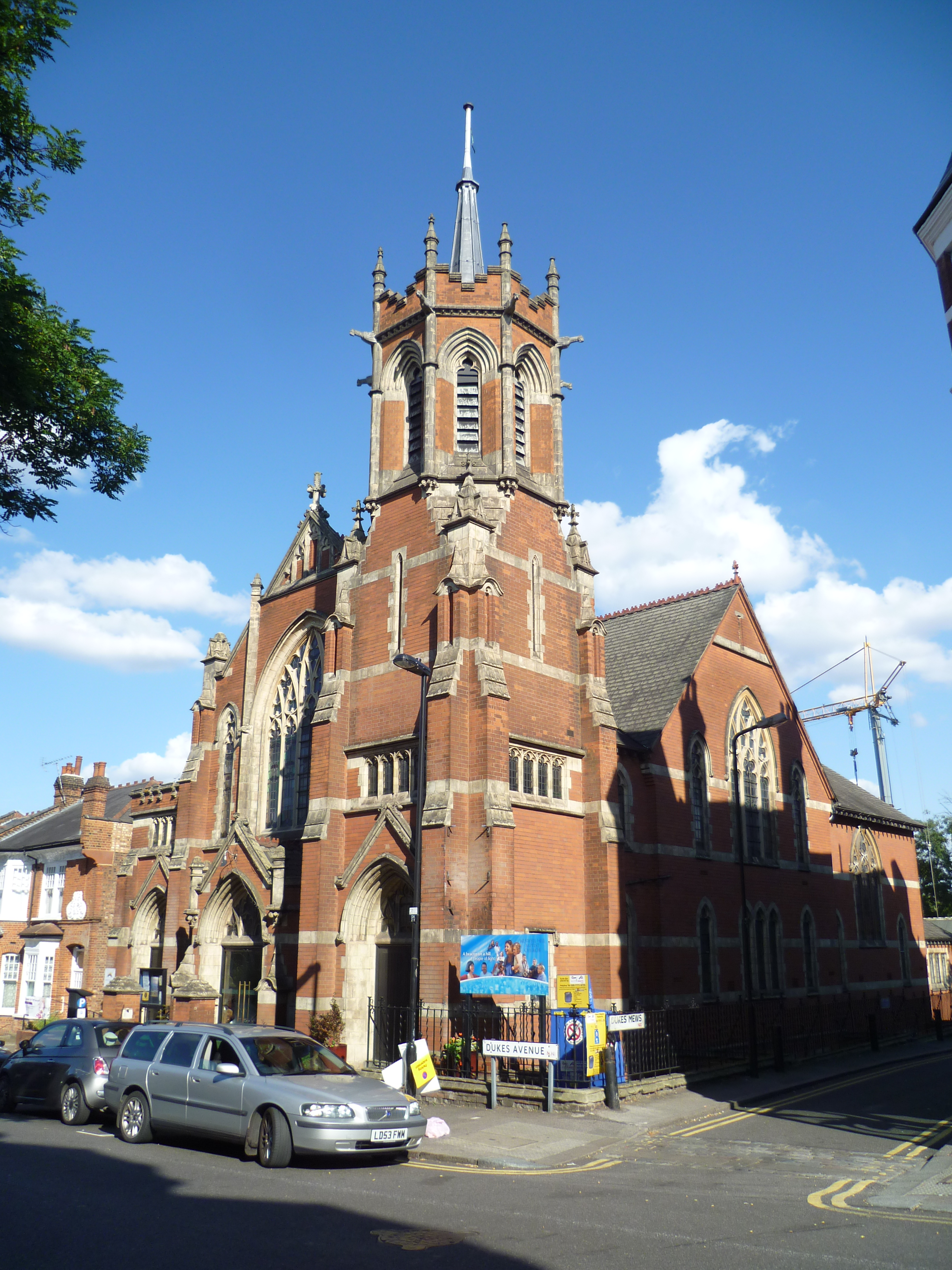
Muswell Hill Baptist Church

Muswell Hill Baptist Church is a Baptist church in Muswell Hill, London, and a Grade II listed building with Historic England. It was built between 1900 and 1901 by G. & R. P. Baines.
