= The Athenaeum, Muswell Hill =

Former venue in Muswell Hill, London

Coordinates: 51.589882°N 0.145546°W

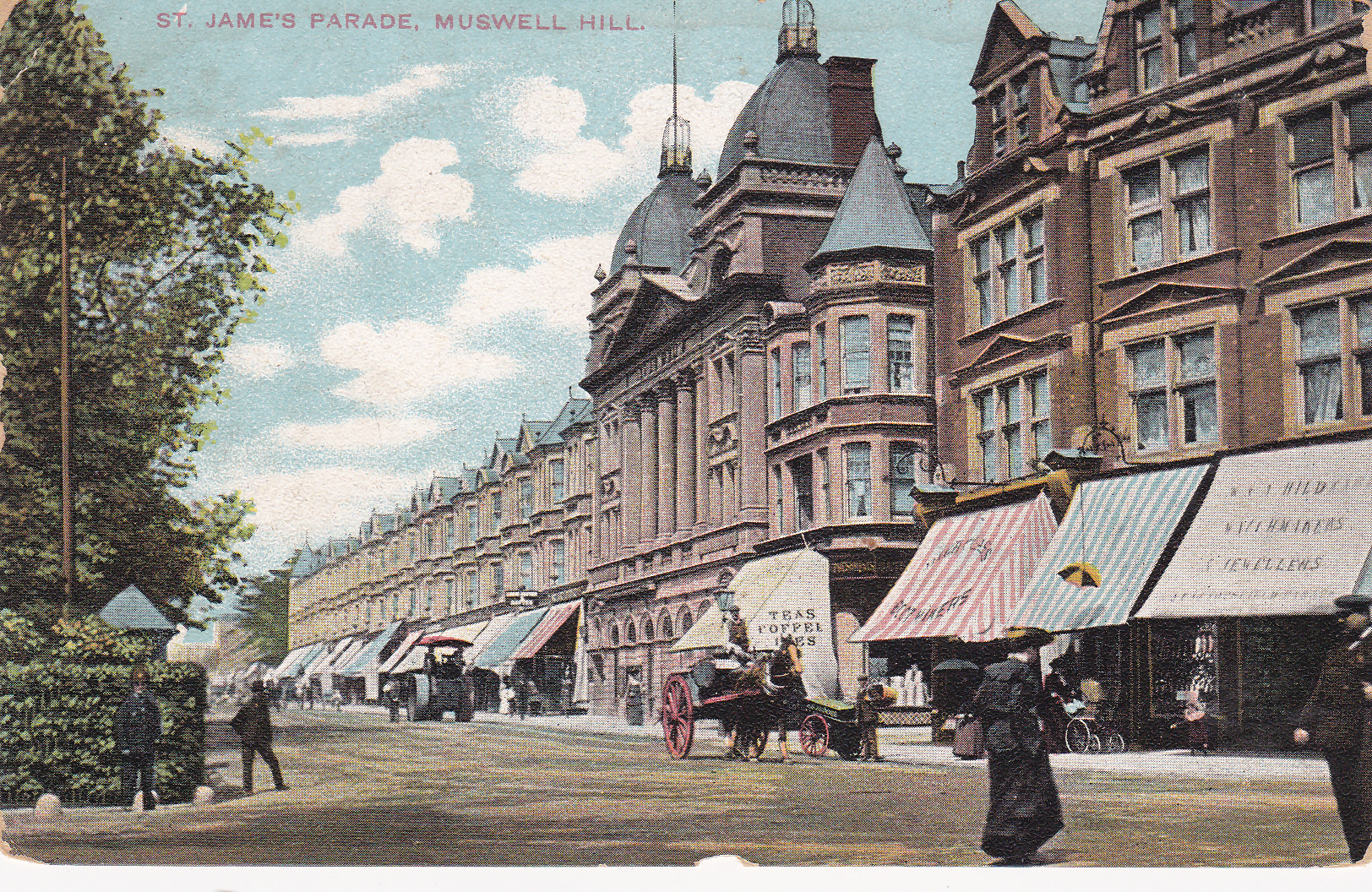
Postcard of The Athenaeum, 1905

The Athenaeum was a multipurpose venue standing on Fortis Green Road in London's Muswell Hill. Among other functions, its spaces were variously used as a music hall, conference rooms and a cinema.

== History ==
Construction of the Athenaeum was completed in 1900 during the development of Muswell Hill by James Edmondson which had begun in 1897.

In 1918 the main hall opened as a cinema with a screening of the silent film The Conqueror. The leasing faced resistance due to the loss of the hall as community space. In 1930 the cinema was modernised to allow for sound films.

In 1936 an Odeon cinema opened across the road from the Athenaeum; unable to deal with such competition, the Athenaeum's cinema was closed and turned into a Palais de Danse the following year. It continued being used in such a capacity, as well as for other social functions and community events, until 1966 when the building was demolished to make way for a Sainsbury's with a block of flats above. The name remains only in the nearby street Athenaeum Place.

== See also ==
- Muswell Hill
- Everyman Cinema, Muswell Hill
