= Alexandra Park School =

Location
- Bidwell Gardens; Bounds Green, London, N11 2AZ; England; 51°36′08″N 0°08′13″W

Information
- Type: Academy
- Motto: Success for all
- Established: 1999
- Trust: New River Trust
- Department for Education URN: 137531 Tables
- Ofsted: Reports
- Head teacher: Michael McKenzie
- Gender: Co-educational
- Age: 11 to 18
- Enrolment: c. 1800
- Colours: Red, Black, White
- Website: https://alexandrapark.school/

Alexandra Park School is a mixed secondary school and sixth-form with academy status in Bounds Green, in the London Borough of Haringey. The school was awarded specialist school status in 2005 and converted to academy status in 2011

== History ==
The current school replaced earlier ones and were opened to Year 7 pupils on 9 September 1999. An extension to the school in 2006 received a commendation at the Civic Trust Awards.

Subsequent development of the school included the addition of a teaching block for art and design technology, a science centre, a performing arts department and a new six form extension that has been constructed .

== Location ==
The school is named after Alexandra Park, located approximately 500 yards (460 m) away from its current site. The present school is at the edge of the Muswell Hill Golf Course. The main entrance is on Durnsford Park, with an additional entrance on Rhodes Avenue.

== Recognition ==
Alexandra Park School was rated ‘outstanding’ in all categories evaluated by Ofsted in its 2011 and 2023 inspections.

The school participates in the New River Teaching Alliance, which supports teacher training initiatives.

According to BBC News, in 2016, students achieved the highest average score among participating UK schools in the international PISA education rankings, with an average of 564 points.

== Notable staff ==
Crispin Bonham-Carter, a former television and film actor, taught English and Classics at the school for ten years, including five years as a Head of Year.
