= Scarlet and Black (TV series) =

1993 British TV series

- Genre: Drama
- Based on: The Red and The Black by Stendhal
- Written by: Stephen Lowe
- Directed by: Ben Bolt
- Starring: Ewan McGregor; Rachel Weisz; Alice Krige; Christopher Fulford; T. P. McKenna; Crispin Bonham-Carter; Stratford Johns; Martin Jarvis
- Country of origin: United Kingdom
- Original language: English
- No. of series: 1
- No. of episodes: originally aired as 3 episodes, but 4 on DVD and VHS release

Production
- Executive producer: David Snodin
- Producer: Rosalind Wolfes
- Running time: 240 minutes
- Production company: BBC Television

Original release
- Network: BBC 1
- Release: 31 October – 14 November 1993

Related
- Scarlet and Black (1965 TV serial)

Scarlet and Black is a British four-part television drama series first aired in 1993 on BBC 1 by the BBC with a cast including Ewan McGregor and Rachel Weisz. The series was adapted by Stephen Lowe from the novel The Red and the Black (1830) by French writer Stendhal. The story follows an ambitious, but impoverished young man, who seduces women of high social standing in order to improve his prospects.

== Adaptation ==
The series is a faithful adaptation of the novel Le Rouge et le Noir (save for the erroneous use of modern French tricolore flag, which was banned at the time of the French Restauration) and is condensed into four episodes, each 50 minutes in length. A notable addition to the plot is the figure of Napoleon, which the protagonist, Julien Sorel, envisages during the main turning points of the story. Napoleon represents Julien's ambition in the serial, he compares himself with the French hero, seeing himself as an extraordinary individual. Another historical error is a mention, by Sorel, of the "Italian Ambassador". Italy, as a country and kingdom, came into existence in 1861 only.

== Cast ==
- Ewan McGregor - Julien Sorel
- Martin Jarvis - Monsieur de Rênal
- Alice Krige - Madame de Rênal
- Rachel Weisz - Mathilde de la Mole
- T. P. McKenna - Marquis de la Mole
- Jo Ross - Marquise de la Mole
- Stratford Johns - Abbé Pirard
- Clive Arrindel - Abbé de Frilair
- Christopher Fulford - Napoleon
- Michael Attwell - Monsieur Valenod
- Crispin Bonham-Carter - Comte de Croisenois
- Georges Corraface - Comte Altamira
- Edward Atterton - Comte de Beauvoisis
- Helen FitzGerald - Madame de Fervaques
- Jeremy Young - Duke of Wellington

== Episodes ==
=== Episode one ===
In the provincial town of Verrières, Julien Sorel (Ewan McGregor) a carpenter's son who is destined for the church is sought by middle-class families of the town to act as tutor to their offspring.

Julien leaves behind his poor and uncouth father and brothers to take a position negotiated by the Abbé Chénal as tutor to local Mayor M. de Rênal's three sons. Julien impresses Madame de Rênal with his gentle nature and sense of fun when dealing with his young charges.

Julien is asked to illustrate his astounding power of memory by quoting passages from the Bible in Latin at a dinner hosted by the conceited M. de Rénal, who revels in showing off to various local dignitaries the latest addition to his household.

A love affair begins between Madame de Rênal and Julien. Madame de Rênal, a pious woman, is torn between her passion for Julien and religious guilt. The apparition of Napoleon to Julien signifies Julien's relentless ambition as a romantic hero and encourages the conquest.

During a visit by the King of France, Madame de Rênal arranges for Julien to appear in the parade as one of the military guards on horseback. Julien relishes the role, galloping back to change into his cassock in order to be part of the religious procession for the King's visit to the local church. The switching from the scarlet of the military uniform and the black cassock of the church indicates Julien's personal battle between truth and hypocrisy, his humble beginnings and the upper classes.

Eliza, the Rênal's housemaid and secret admirer of Julien, learns of the affair and tells M. de Rênal's rival Monsieur Valenod. Eliza hopes to marry Julien, even though he has made no indication of returning her love, and seeks to end the adulterous affair.

Returning from the festivities, Madame de Rênal finds one of her sons has been taken seriously ill and believes that this is a punishment from God for her affair with Julien. This, however, does not prevent them from embracing and then collapsing onto the floor at the ill child's bedside.

=== Episode two ===
A letter is received by M. de Rênal, exposing the love affair between his wife and servant. Madame de Rênal double bluffs her husband, stating that the affair is an invention and plot constructed by M. Valenod in order to employ Julien himself and get one over his rival, Rênal.

At confession, Eliza whispers to the Father Chélan of the scandalous affair.

Julien is sent to the seminary at Besançon by Father Chélan in disgrace. He is unpopular with his fellow students and finds an unlikely friendship in Father Pirard, director of the seminary. Grotesquely ugly, Father Pirard stands alone, for he is a man of truth and honesty, in the corrupt world of the church, which Julien witnesses for the first time. Father Pirard is removed from his post at the seminary as he fails to support the Abbé de Frilair and sides with the Marquis de la Mole. Concerned for Julien's future, Father Pirard secures Julien a position as secretary to the Marquis in Paris.

Julien moves within the social circles of the Marquis' children and learns the manners and customs of the aristocracy. Mathilde takes a particular interest in Julien, however, he chides her advances, believing her to be a proud and spoiled young woman.

Julien is scoffed at in the street and challenges the offender to a duel. Julien demands to know his name, which is given as the Comte de Beauvoisis. The next day on arrival at the Comte's residence, and seeing that the Comte is not the man who slighted him, Julien recognises the Comte's chauffeur as the true culprit, the Comte being a man of honour carries out the duel with Julien, whom he presumes is a nobleman. Both men survive (albeit Julien with a superficial wound to the arm) and find the confusion of identity rather amusing and become friends.

=== Episode three ===
Julien is given a blue coat by the Marquis, as the Comte de Beauvoisis has begun a rumour that Julien is in fact the son of a close friend and ally of the Marquis. This suits the Marquis in his plans for Julien and gives the story credence with the presentation of the blue coat.

Mathilde becomes appealing to Julien, as he realises that she has intellect and spirit. Encouraged again by the figure of Napoleon, Julien accepts an invitation by Mathilde to visit her that night, believing that she and her friends are toying with him. Mathilde and Julien spend the night together but the next day, Mathilde rejects him, disgusted that she would give herself to a lowly servant.

Hurt by her rejection, Julien seeks to escape and asks the Marquis if he may leave Paris and visit one of his country estates. The Marquis, however, has greater plans for his young protégé and challenges Julien to memorise a newspaper article, testing his abilities of memory.

Shortly after their affair, Julien is sent on an undercover mission by the Marquis to London, where he is to deliver a secret message to the Duke of Wellington which he has committed to memory. In London he encounters the Comte de Beauvoisis. Julien confides in the Comte that he is unhappy in love as his love for a young woman in Paris is unrequited. The Comte tries to aid Julien by giving him a packet of English love letters for Julien to copy and send to Madame de Fervaques, in order to make Mathilde jealous.

On his return to Paris, Julien relays to the Marquis that the Duke of Wellington is not willing to help his cause, however, for secret services rendered to the crown, Julien is given the Legion of Honour by the Marquis de la Mole.

=== Episode four ===
Julien starts his campaign to win Madame de Fervaques, a pure and devout woman. This has the desired effect on Mathilde and she surrenders herself to Julien, visiting his room at great cost to her reputation.

During Mathilde's eighteenth birthday party, Mathilde reveals to Julien that she is pregnant with his child. Mathilde discloses her condition to her father, who is outraged at his secretary's betrayal. Julien leaves Paris and stays with Father Pirard.

Mathilde convinces her father to arrange an army commission for Julien to enrol as a Lieutenant of the Hussars. Julien is popular and successful in his new position. The Marquis has agreed that after three months separation, his daughter and Julien may marry if they still wish to do so.

The Marquis receives a letter from Madame de Rênal, who feels obliged to inform him of Julien's past, that he preys on weak and lonely women in order to build a position for himself. Without explanation to Mathilde, Julien returns to his home town in his scarlet uniform. On entering the local church he finds Madame de Rênal at prayer, and aiming his pistols shoots her twice.

Julien is imprisoned and later put on trial. Julien thinks he has killed Madame de Rênal. Mathilde seeks help from the church by speaking to the Abbé de Frilair. He states that he controls the jury and that the foreman of the jury has lately been made a local mayor, this is Monsieur Valenod. Julien is found guilty of attempted murder and is sentenced to death.

Madame de Rênal recovers from her injuries and her love for Julien is reawakened. She visits Julien in prison and he realises that he truly loves her. Mathilde loves Julien, even though she is aware that he loves Madame de Rênal. Julien asks Mathilde to take courage and forget him.

Julien is guillotined. Mathilde takes his severed head and buries it in a cave, which she has created as her shrine to him. Madame de Rênal dies of a broken heart, shortly after Julien's death.

== DVD release ==
The DVD of the series was released on 9 June 2014 by Spirit Entertainment Limited in the UK, this complete series was also released on 24 January 2000 on VHS by Acorn Media in the UK.
