= Guy Chester Centre =

Coordinates: 51°35′40.5″N 0°8′43.8″W

The Guy Chester Centre is responsible for areas of the North Bank Estate in Muswell Hill, North London, which is owned by the Methodist Church of Great Britain. The Centre manages Chester House, which is a student hall of residence.

== North Bank Estate ==
The North Bank Estate takes its name from a large old house with extensive grounds, which was purchased by H Guy Chester OBE in 1924. Chester and his family lived in Hazlehyrst, an Edwardian villa on Colney Hatch Lane, which is still part of the grounds.

In 1932, an extensive programme of alterations and redecoration was carried out at the North Bank house and it was then placed at the disposal of the local Methodist church. On his sixtieth birthday, in February 1947, Chester handed over the whole estate to the national Methodist Church. The estate was again extended in 1960 and presently covers around 12 acres (49,000 m^{2}) including housing for MHA (formerly Methodist Homes for the Aged).

== Chester House ==
For many years Guy Chester had "looked forward to a time when it might be possible to build a residential centre for young men and women who were either studying or working in London." The need to find new premises for the Methodist Youth Department (MYD) led to a committee being set up in 1955 which agreed that a joint project "was not only feasible but also desirable." Chester donated the site and the first £50,000. It opened in 1960 and was named Chester House (without his prior knowledge).

== Guy Chester Centre ==
In 2000, when the whole of the Chester House building was made available, the title of the Guy Chester Centre was used for the property and grounds management of the North Bank Estate.

== Grounds ==
The estate has large grounds, which include formal gardens, lawns, ponds and a wood. Wild fauna includes foxes, rabbits and ducks. The grounds are open till 4 pm and are classed as a "Quiet Garden".
