= Tottenham Wood =

Part of the Great Forest of Middlesex

Coordinates: 51.6058°N 0.1357°W

Tottenham Wood was part of the Great Forest of Middlesex. It no longer survives, except for a small fragment in the form of Bluebell Wood.
