= Samuel Angell =

British architect and archaeologist

Samuel Angell (1800–1866) was a British architect and archaeologist.

== Life ==
Angell was born in 1800, son of William Sandell Angell of Cornhill, in the City of London, and Hornsey.

Angell studied at the Royal Academy in London and with Thomas Hardwick. In 1823 he and William Harris, a fellow architectural student, went to Sicily to look for evidence for the use of polychromy on ancient Greek monuments. While digging without permission in the ancient city of Selinus (Seliunte) they uncovered the broken pieces of some metopes from the frieze of the temple which showed traces of colour. Harris died while in Sicily, and Angell's attempts to remove the sculptures were foiled by the authorities. Their findings were published in 1826 as Sculptured Metopes Discovered Amongst the Ruins of the Temples of the Ancient City of Selinus in Sicily in the Year 1823.

Between 1824 and 1859 he held the post of architect to the Company of Clothworkers, one of the City of London's Livery companies. He laid out their estate at Islington for building. and rebuilt the company's hall in Mincing Lane (completed in 1860). He also designed buildings for the company's estates in Ulster, including the first buildings of the new seaside resort at Castlerock.

In 1832 the returns of a census of district surveyors were published by order of the House of Commons. At this time Angell was district surveyor for a 45-acre area of London encompassing the Liberty of Saffron Hill, Hatton Garden and Ely Rents, those parts of the parishes of St Clement Danes and St Mary-le-Strand within the liberty of the Duchy of Lancaster, and the precinct of the Savoy. He had held the post since April 1831. He stated that he was also surveyor to both the Sadlers and Clothworkers' companies. His address was given as 26, Ely Place.

He was one of two architects co-opted onto the committee charged with selecting the design for the new buildings for the Foreign Office (although only as an advisor without voting rights), and in 1858 he was one of the witnesses questioned by the Select Committee of the House of Commons appointed to consider and report on the project, "in relation to the future Rebuilding of other offices on a uniform Plan".

In 1861 he supervised the excavation of the remains of the mediaeval Chertsey Abbey in Surrey.

Angell was a member of the Graphic Society and a Fellow of the Royal Institute of British Architects. He died on 28 November 1866 at Abbey Lodge, Chertsey.

== Works ==
- Library for Benjamin Godfrey Windus at his house in Tottenham (1832). Windus used the room to hang much of his collection of watercolours by J. M. W. Turner.
- Blue School, High Road, Tottenham (1833). Now the 'Pride of Tottenham' public house.
- General Hospital, King's Lynn, Norfolk (1834). In collaboration with John Sugars.
- Christ Church, Caroline Place, Camberwell (consecrated 1838). Demolished c.1868.
- St James, Muswell Hill (1842). Demolished and replaced by the present church of 1898-1910 by JS Alder.

=== For the Clothworkers Company ===
- Cliff House, Miramar, The Villa and the Bathing Lodge at Castlerock, County Londonderry.
- Clothworkers Hall, Dunster Court, Mincing Lane (1860; destroyed 1941).

== Publications ==
- Sculptured metopes discovered amongst the ruins of the temples of the ancient city of Selinus in Sicily in the year 1823. With William Harris; descriptions by Angell and Thomas Evans (1826) (digitized, UB Heidelberg).
- A letter to Richard Lambert Jones ... on the subject of widening the Poultry (1837).
- An Historical Sketch of the Royal Exchange (1838).
- The Excavations upon the site of Chertsey Abbey (1862).
