= Muswell Hill =

Area of north London, England

Coordinates: 51.592°N 0.143°W

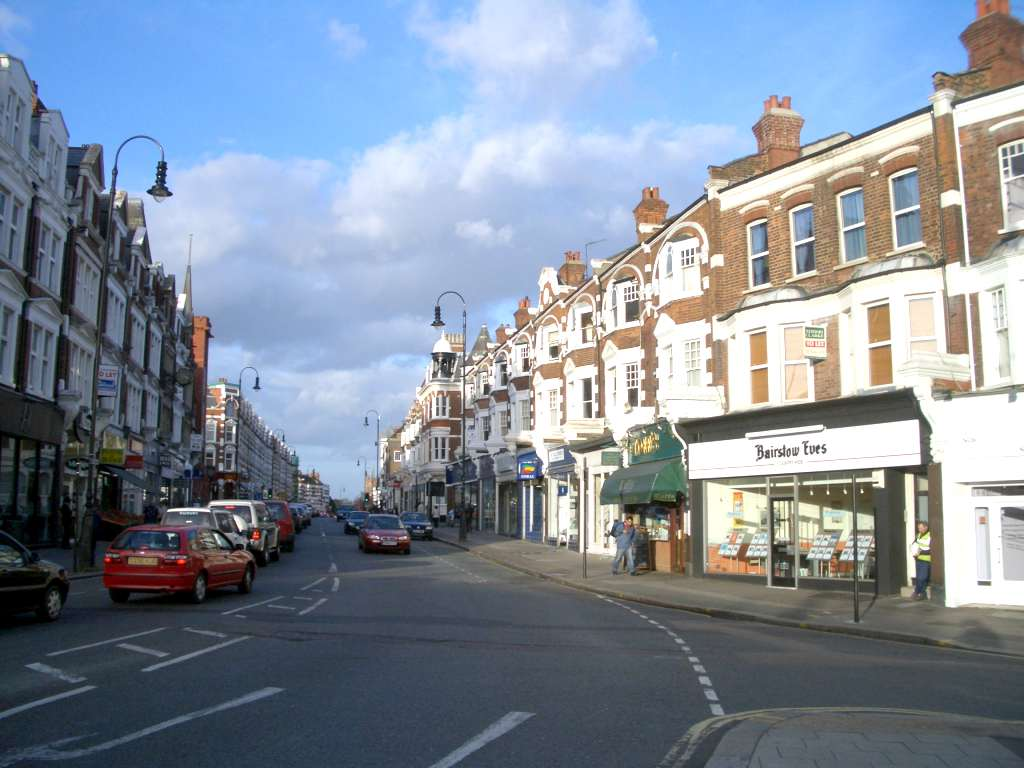
- Muswell Hill Broadway

- Location within Greater London
- OS grid reference: TQ287897
- London borough: Haringey; Barnet
- Ceremonial county: Greater London
- Region: London
- Country: England
- Sovereign state: United Kingdom
- Post town: LONDON
- Postcode district: N10
- Dialling code: 020
- Police: Metropolitan
- Fire: London
- Ambulance: London
- UK Parliament: Hornsey and Friern Barnet
- London Assembly: Enfield and Haringey; Barnet and Camden

Muswell Hill is a district of the London Borough of Haringey, in north London, England. The hill, which reaches over 100 m (330 ft) above sea level, is situated 5 1/2 mi (9 km) north of Charing Cross. It has many streets with Edwardian architecture. Neighbouring areas include Highgate, Hampstead Garden Suburb, East Finchley and Crouch End.

== History ==
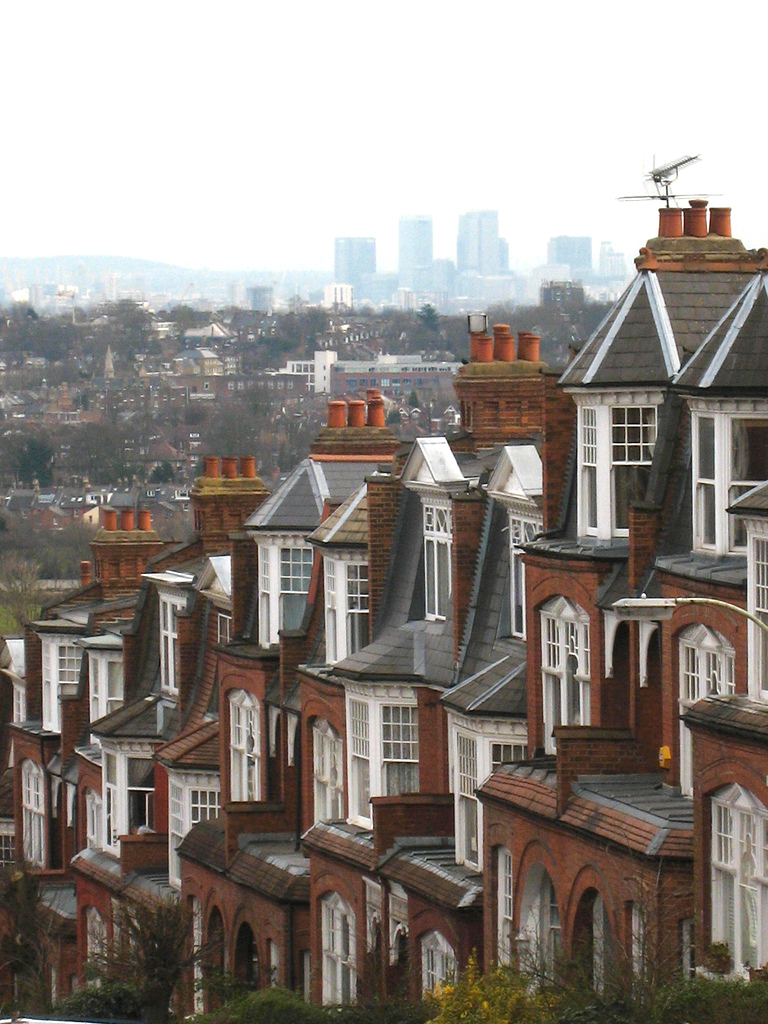
View looking south east towards Canary Wharf

Ancient Roman presence in the area has been attested to through the discovery of Roman coins near Southwood Lane and Muswell Hill Road.

The earliest records of Muswell Hill date from the 12th century. The Bishop of London, who was the Lord of the Manor of Haringey, (Note: Harringay, Haringey and Hornsey were used interchangeably in this period. For further information see History of Harringay.) owned the area and granted 26 ha (64 acres), located to the east of Colney Hatch Lane, to a newly formed order of nuns. The nuns built a chapel on the site and called it Our Lady of Muswell.

The name Muswell is believed to come from a natural spring or well (the "Mossy Well"), said to have miraculous properties. A traditional story tells that Scottish king Malcolm IV was cured of disease after drinking the water. The area became a place of pilgrimage for healing during medieval times. (Note: Muswell Hill Manor in Oxfordshire was said to be owned by the King of Scotland in the 12th century.) The River Moselle, which has its source in Muswell Hill and Highgate, derives its name from this district; it was originally known as the Mosa or Mosella. (Note: The earliest known description of the river is given by the Tottenham historian Rev William Bedwell (1561-1632), who used these two variants in William Bedwell's A Briefe Description of the Town of Tottenham Highcrosse in Middlesex, 1631.) Until the 1950s, the town's name was often pronounced "Muzzle Hill".

In the 18th century, Muswell Hill was a scattered village consisting mainly of detached villas with large gardens. In 1787, one commentator wrote that nowhere within 100 miles (160 km) of London was there a village so pleasant or with such varied views. Little had changed by the middle of the 19th century. One of the houses of the time was The Limes, which occupied the angle of Muswell Hill Road with Colney Hatch Lane; it was a three-storeyed house, with portico and two-storeyed wing, approached by a double carriage drive through impressive gateways. The large grounds of the house extended to Tetherdown and included a lake. Opposite The Limes was Muswell Hill pond and, beyond that, the Green Man inn, which was built of stone and likely dating to at least 1552. Colney Hatch Lane itself was part of an ancient route from London to the north; it was once known as Muswell Hill Lane.

Further down the hill past the Green Man was The Elms, a squat three-storeyed house, later improved by Thomas Cubitt standing in 11 acres (4.5 ha); part of the grounds of which were laid out by Joseph Paxton. A short distance down the north side of Muswell Hill was The Grove, which was three storeys high and had nine bays, with pedimented projections at each end. It stood in 7.9 acres (3.2 ha) of grounds, which contained a 184 m (201 yd) avenue of oaks. In 1774, the house was occupied by Topham Beauclerk. The Elms was demolished in 1900 to make way for Dukes Avenue.

=== 19th century ===
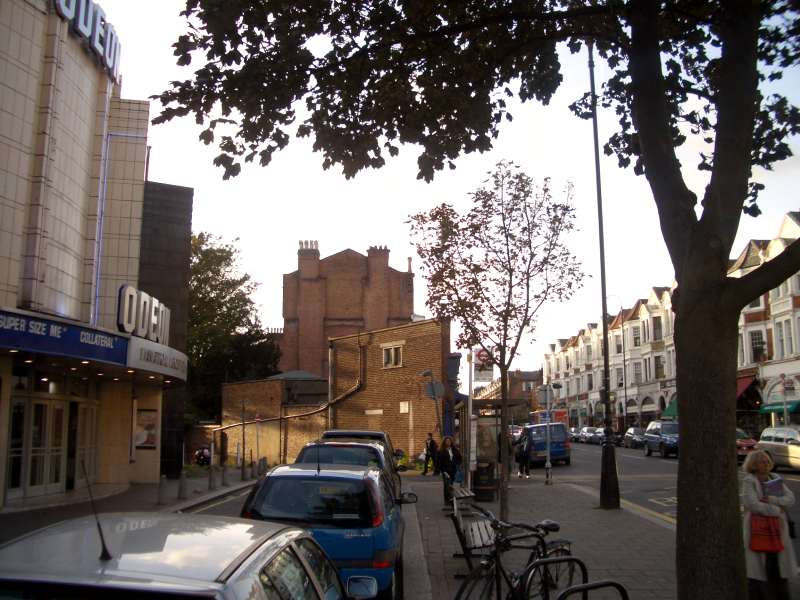
The former Odeon cinema, now operated by Everyman, is a Grade II* listed building

A little farther down the hill stood Grove Lodge, also in wooded grounds. Altogether there were eight properties in Muswell Hill worthy of note in 1817.

Parallel with Muswell Hill was a track known as St James's Lane, which ran across a triangle of wasteland. By the middle of the 19th century, houses were already dispersed along the lane at the foot of which was Lalla Rookh, a two-storeyed villa with a wide verandah. Other buildings included cottages or huts, both single and in terraces.

It was not until the end of the 19th century that Muswell Hill began to be developed more densely from a collection of country houses to the London suburb that it is today. The development was spurred by the opening in 1873 of Alexandra Palace, a large pleasure pavilion built on the most easterly of north London's gravel hills and intended as the counterpart to the Crystal Palace on Sydenham Hill in south London. Alexandra Palace was served by the Edgware, Highgate and London Railway from Highgate and Finsbury Park, with intermediary stations at Muswell Hill and Cranley Gardens. The foot of Alexandra Palace was served by another railway line, with connecting services to Finsbury Park and Kings Cross stations.

=== 20th century ===
Most development was initiated in the early 20th century, when the current street pattern was set out and elegant Edwardian retail parades were constructed. The shopping centre is based on roads that form three sides of a square: Fortis Green Road, Muswell Hill Broadway and the extension of the Broadway into Colney Hatch Lane. At each node point is a church: United Reformed, Church of England, Methodist and Roman Catholic; one of the nodes, opposite St James CoE, was also the site of the Athenaeum music hall (later demolished with the site redeveloped as a supermarket), opposite which a surviving art deco Odeon cinema was built in the 1930s. The site of the Ritz, a cinema formerly at the top of Muswell Hill on the next node to the east, has been redeveloped as offices.

The Edgware, Highgate and London Railway was closed in 1954. It had been intended to integrate this route into the London Underground's Northern line, under the Northern Heights plan; some contemporary tube maps (e.g. the 1948 map) showed the line as being under construction. However, this plan was cancelled after the Second World War and the railway line was abandoned. The line was later converted to become the Parkland Walk rail trail.

In 1979, Wetherspoons opened their first pub, on Colney Hatch Lane.

In 2013 and 2020, Muswell Hill was named one of the five most desirable places to live in London in the Sunday Times' "Best Places To Live" guide.

== Governance ==
The hill was part of the Bishop of London's Manor of Hornsey, an area served from the medieval period by the ancient parish of Hornsey. Parishes were originally ecclesiastic in purpose but, from the Tudor era onwards, had a civic as well as ecclesiastical purpose.

In 1903, the area of the civil parish of Hornsey became the Municipal Borough of Hornsey, within the administrative county of Middlesex. Then, in 1965, Hornsey merged with Tottenham and Wood Green to form the modern London Borough of Haringey.

Northern parts of the N10 postal area, sometimes also regarded as part of Muswell Hill, were part of the parish of Friern Barnet, which subsequently became Friern Barnet Urban District before becoming part of the London Borough of Barnet.

The area is in the Hornsey and Friern Barnet parliamentary constituency. The area is part of the Muswell Hill ward for elections to Haringey London Borough Council.

== Geography ==
Close to Alexandra Park and Highgate Wood, Muswell Hill's architecture is predominantly Edwardian. Muswell Hill Broadway and Fortis Green Road, the main shopping streets, still maintain their historic character with most of the original facades preserved above street level. The area has a synagogue and six churches, one of which has been converted into a steak house.

Nearest places:

- Colney Hatch
- Crouch End
- East Finchley
- Friern Barnet
- Highgate
- Hornsey
- Wood Green.

== Education ==
=== Primary schools ===
- Coppetts Wood Primary School and Children's Centre
- Coldfall Primary School
- Eden Primary
- Hollickwood JMI School
- Muswell Hill Primary School
- Norfolk House Preparatory
- Our Lady of Muswell RC Primary School
- Rhodes Avenue Primary School
- St James C of E Primary School
- Tetherdown Primary School.

=== Secondary schools ===
- Alexandra Park School
- Fortismere School.

=== Special schools ===
- Blanche Nevile School: for deaf and hearing impaired children, based on the sites of Highgate Primary and Fortismere Schools.
- TreeHouse School: based at the Pears National Centre for Autism Education.

== Transport ==
=== Railway ===
Muswell Hill is no longer directly served by a National Rail station or the London Underground.

Nearby tube stations include:

- Northern Line: Highgate and East Finchley
- Piccadilly Line: Bounds Green, Finsbury Park, Turnpike Lane and Wood Green.

National Rail services pass to the east of Muswell Hill:

- Great Northern services call at Alexandra Palace, Hornsey and Finsbury Park; destinations include Moorgate, King's Cross, Welwyn Garden City, Stevenage and Cambridge
- London Overground trains on the Suffragette line serve Crouch Hill station, between Gospel Oak and Barking; this line runs to the south of Muswell Hill.

The Muswell Hill Metro Group campaigns to reinstate the historic railway line, which ran between Alexandra Palace and Finsbury Park, via Muswell Hill and Highgate. The group says that the line would relieve congestion on local roads and that an electric railway would improve local air quality. Whilst most of the trackbed remains clear, forming the Parkland Walk, it is now blocked in two places by Muswell Hill and St James primary schools.

=== Buses ===
Muswell Hill Broadway and Muswell Hill Road are served by London Buses, providing the area with direct connections to nearby stations and central London.

List of bus routes from Muswell Hill
Route number	Start	End	Key destinations
43	Friern Barnet	London Bridge	Highgate, Archway, Islington, Angel, City of London, Bank
102	Brent Cross	Edmonton Green	Bounds Green, East Finchley, Golders Green
134	North Finchley	Warren Street	Highgate, Archway, Kentish Town, Camden Town
144	Muswell Hill	Edmonton Green	Wood Green
234	Barnet	Archway	East Finchley
299	Muswell Hill	Cockfosters	Bounds Green, Southgate
634	Muswell Hill	Barnet	Whetstone
W3	Finsbury Park	Northumberland Park	Alexandra Palace, Alexandra Palace, Wood Green, Tottenham
W7	Muswell Hill	Finsbury Park	Crouch End, Crouch Hill

=== Roads ===
The A504 passes east–west through Muswell Hill. Eastbound traffic is carried towards Hornsey, Wood Green and the A10. Westbound destinations include East Finchley, Hendon and the M1.

The A1201 terminates at Muswell Hill. Southbound destinations along this route include Crouch Hill, Finsbury Park and Highbury.

Highgate is to the south of the district and can be reached via Muswell Hill Road. To the north, Colney Hatch, Friern Barnet and Whetstone can be reached via Colney Hatch Lane. Both routes are numbered B550.

The A1 passes to the south of Muswell Hill, carrying traffic southbound towards Archway, Islington and the City of London. To the north, the route crosses the North Circular Road (A406); traffic can reach destinations such as Mill Hill, Watford, Stevenage and Peterborough.

Cycling infrastructure in Muswell Hill is limited. The former London Cycle Network developed two signposted routes through Muswell Hill:

- Route 6 – an incomplete but signposted route from Barnet to central London, passing through the Broadway on main roads.
- Route 54 – an unbroken but signposted route to Walthamstow, via Tottenham, following main roads. Between Highgate Wood and Alexandra Palace, the route skirts around the south-eastern edge of Muswell Hill on the Parkland Walk, a rail trail.

The Haringey Cycling Campaign is a local cycling lobby group.

== Demography ==
The N10 postal area, which includes parts of Friern Barnet, had a population of 27,992 in the 2011 census.

The same census showed that, in the much smaller Muswell Hill electoral ward of the London Borough of Haringey, 84% of the population was White (65% British, 16% Other, 3% Irish). Both Christian and irreligious were both 40%, while the Jewish population stood at 5.3%.

== Places of interest ==
- Alexandra Palace
- Alexandra Park
- Golf Course Allotments: the largest allotment site in the area
- The Guy Chester Centre of the Methodist church
- Muswell Hill Baptist Church, on Dukes Avenue, listed on the National Heritage List for England
- Oliver Tambo Memorial Statue, at the Albert Road Recreation Ground
- The Furlong, on Colney Hatch Lane, was the first ever Wetherspoons pub, under the name Martin’s Free House
- Muswell Hill United Synagogue
- St James's Church Hall: historic church hall.

== In popular culture ==
- In the war romance film The Americanization of Emily (1964), Emily's mother lives in a house in Dukes Avenue. Exterior shots show Alexandra Palace in the background.
- In the 1970s BBC TV comedy series Porridge, the principal character, Norman Stanley Fletcher, played by Ronnie Barker, hailed from Muswell Hill. External shots of Fletcher's house in the sequel, Going Straight, were filmed in Lauradale Road
- The Kinks recorded the 1971 LP Muswell Hillbillies, which included the song "Muswell Hillbilly"
- The Yorkshire Television sitcom That's My Boy (1981–1986), starring Mollie Sugden and Christopher Blake, made frequent references to Muswell Hill, as the family lived in the area throughout the first four series
- Series one of the 1993 sitcom Sean's Show is set in Muswell Hill.
- The Doctor Who episode "The Idiot's Lantern" (2006) is set in Muswell Hill, during Queen Elizabeth II's coronation in 1953
- The Madness song "Driving in My Car" includes the line "I drive up to Muswell Hill, I've even been to Selsey Bill"
- Muswell Hill is a 2012 Torben Betts play which "hold[s] a mirror up to middle-class delusion".

== Notable people ==
See People from Muswell Hill and People from Fortis Green categories.

- John Logie Baird was the first person to transmit moving pictures, now called television. The first public broadcasts were from nearby Alexandra Palace before WW2. His scanning, rotating disc system was later replaced by a more modern electronic system. The former John Baird pub, now the Village Green, in Fortis Green Road was named after him.
- Actor, director, comedian and writer Mackenzie Crook lives in Muswell Hill.
- Musicians Ray and Dave Davies, founding members of The Kinks, grew up in Muswell Hill; the album title Muswell Hillbillies being an obvious reference to their youth. In 1964, they formed the band and allegedly played their first ever gig in the Clissold Arms in Fortis Green. Categorised in the United States as a British Invasion band, it is recognised as one of the most important and influential rock groups of the era.
- Singer-songwriter Rose Gray was born in Muswell Hill on 31 December 1996
- Musician Michael Kiwanuka was born and raised in Muswell Hill; he was the winner of the Mercury Prize 2020 for his album Kiwanuka and a nominee for the 2021 63rd Grammy Award for Best Rock Album. His album Love & Hate went to number 1 on the UK album chart in 2016
- Former KGB agent Alexander Litvinenko lived in Muswell Hill from his exile in 2000 until his assassination in 2006
- The group Fairport Convention started in the Muswell Hill family home of Simon Nicol. The house, Fairport, is on the south side of Fortis Green near to the junction with Tetherdown and Fortis Green Road.
- The serial killer and necrophile Dennis Nilsen committed his later murders in his Cranley Gardens flat in Muswell Hill and became known as the "Muswell Hill Murderer"
- A resident for a short time was the Russian-born England Rugby union star Prince Alexander Obolensky, who died in Suffolk in an aircraft accident in 1940 while training as an RAF pilot
- Philip Martell, musical director for Hammer House of Horrors, lived in Woodland Gardens.
- Poet Michael Wayne Rosen, known for his children's stories and poems, resides here
- Paul Andrew Smith was born in Muswell Hill, at 12 Crown Road, and later became a founding member of the band Wednesday, formed in 1967.
- Musician, author, poet, wit and English eccentric Vivian Stanshall lived his final years in Muswell Hill, dying in a fire in his Hillfield Park flat in 1995.
- Composer Daniel Blumberg, known for his Oscar winning score for The Brutalist, grew up in Muswell Hill.

== See also ==
- Hornsey (parish) for the local government unit of which Muswell Hill was part from medieval times to 1867
- Municipal Borough of Hornsey for the local government unit, of which Muswell Hill was part from 1903 to 1965.
