= St Mary's Church, South Tidworth =

St Mary's Church
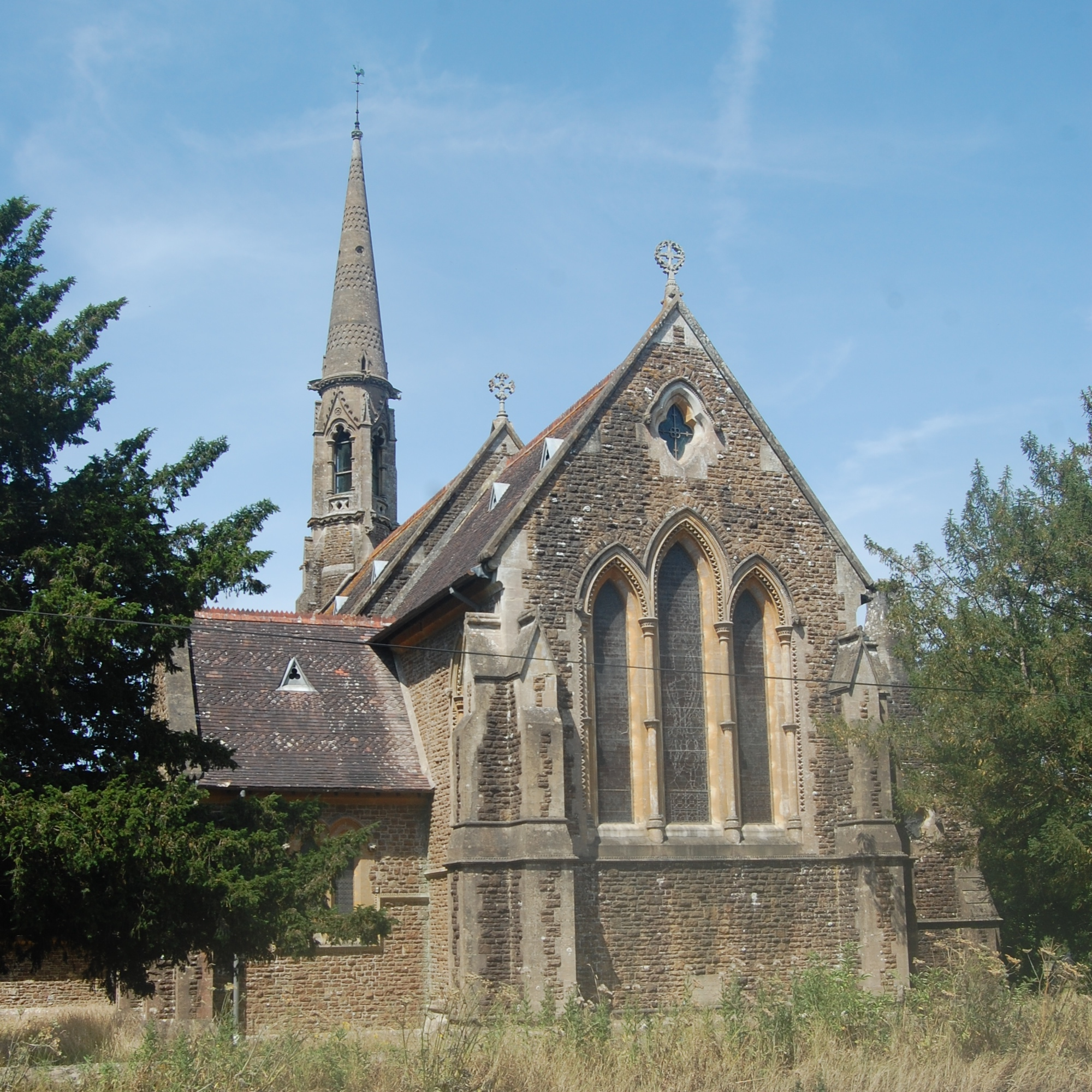
- The former church in July 2022

- Location within Wiltshire
- 51°13′42″N 1°39′52″W
- Location: South Tidworth, Wiltshire, England

History
- Built: 1878

Site notes
- Architect: John Johnson
- Architectural style: Gothic Revival

Listed Building – Grade I
- Designated: 7 March 1973
- Reference no.: 1093240

St Mary's Church in South Tidworth, Wiltshire, England, was built in 1878. It is recorded in the National Heritage List for England as a designated Grade I listed building, and is now a redundant church in the care of the Churches Conservation Trust.

The church is built of rock-faced brown stone, in a style described by Historic England as "spectacular Geometrical Gothic". It was designed by John Johnson, with work supervised by G.H. Gordon, for Sir John Kelk. Kelk, an engineer and major building contractor who owned the Tedworth House estate nearby, had previously worked with Johnson on the construction of the Alexandra Palace. St Mary's cost Kelk £12,000. The site is near that of the medieval parish church.

The chancel is 28 feet (8.5 m) by 17 feet (5.2 m) and the three by nave 43 feet (13 m) by 17 feet (5.2 m). There are also north and south aisles, a north vestry and a south porch. At the west end is a tall and slender bell turret with a tapering spire, also known as a flèche, above a massive stepped buttress. Nikolaus Pevsner calls the bell tower "perverse and wilful...à la Burges".

Pevsner considers the interior "sensational, in scale as in everything else". It includes carvings and polished marble shafts in the columns of the arcade piers. The chancel floor is laid with Italian mosaic. There is also a silver chalice and patens of 1837 and 1877 and a silver-gilt flagon of 1869. The altar and other carved stonework are by Farmer & Brindley. The stained glass is by Clayton and Bell, apart from the east window which was designed by Heaton, Butler and Bayne.

Outside the church is an avenue of yew trees, the largest of which has a girth of 7 feet 9 inches (2.36 m).

The church was declared redundant on 1 September 1972, and was vested in the Trust on 19 December 1973. Access to the church is restricted after vandalism in 2016.

== See also ==
- List of churches preserved by the Churches Conservation Trust in Southwest England

== Sources ==
- Bullen, Michael; Crook, John; Hubbuck, Rodney; Pevsner, Nikolaus (2010). Hampshire: Winchester and the North. The Buildings Of England. New Haven, CT and London: Yale University Press. ISBN 978-0-300-12084-4.
