= Church of St Edward the Confessor, Romford =

Coordinates: 51°34′45″N 0°10′50″E

St Edward's Church
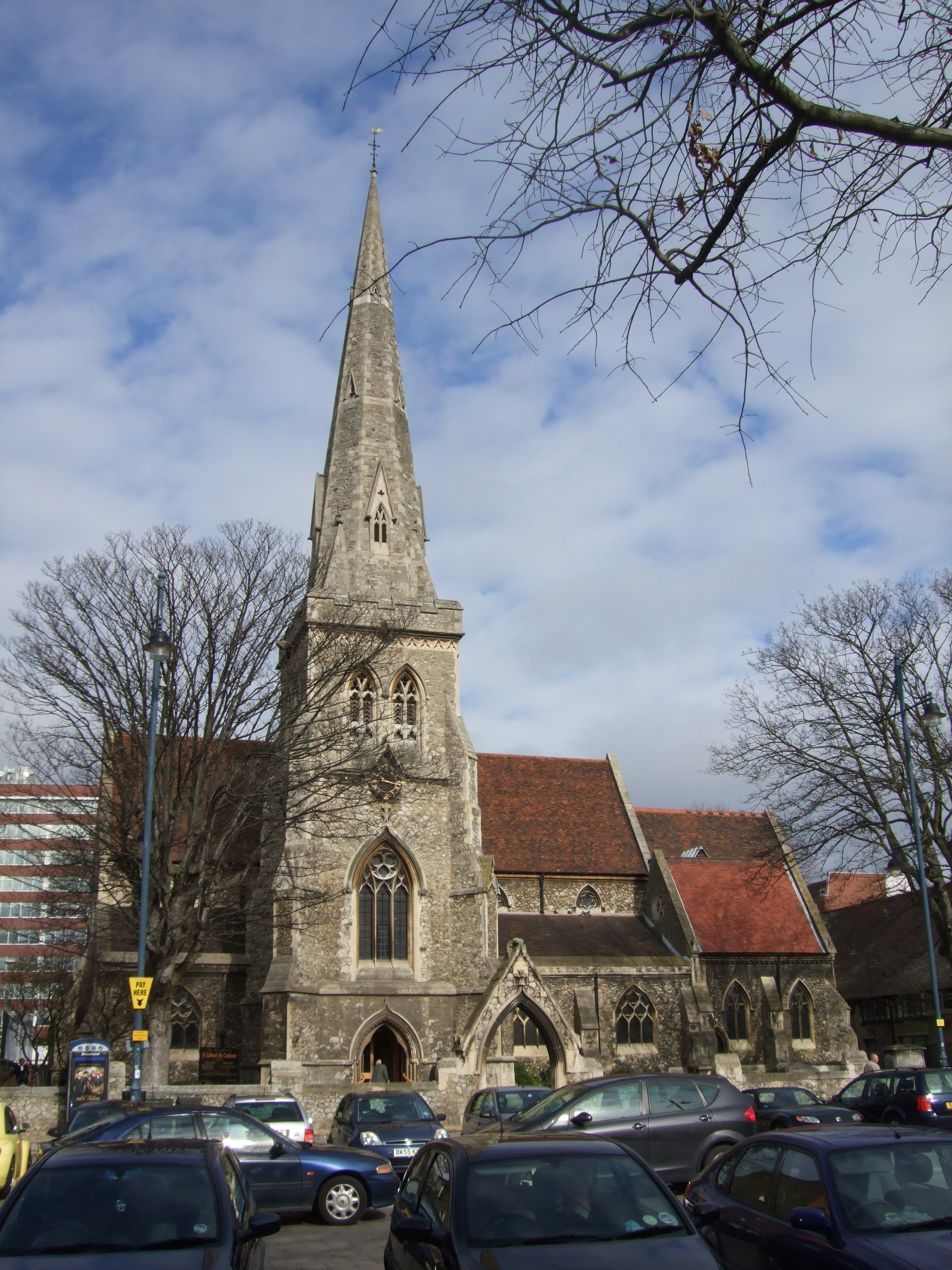
- St Edward the Confessor, Market Place, Romford
- St Edward's Church
- Location: Romford, London Borough of Havering
- Country: England
- Denomination: Church of England
- Churchmanship: Anglo-Catholic
- Website: stedwardsromford.com

History
- Dedication: Blessed Virgin Mary and St Edward the Confessor

Architecture
- Architect: John Johnson
- Style: Victorian Gothic

Administration
- Province: Canterbury
- Diocese: Chelmsford
- Archdeaconry: Barking
- Deanery: Havering
- Parish: Romford

Clergy
- Vicar: Revd Jordan Palmer

Listed Building – Grade II*
- Designated: 4 July 1952
- Reference no.: 1358535

The Church of St Edward the Confessor (full name the Parish Church of the Blessed Virgin Mary and St Edward the Confessor) is an Anglican church in Romford, in the London Borough of Havering, England. It is part of the Diocese of Chelmsford. The building dates from 1849–50 and replaced an earlier church which was demolished in the mid-19th century. There has been a religious building on the site since the end of the 14th century. The current church was completed in a Gothic Revival design by the English architect John Johnson. It was designated as a Grade II* listed building by English Heritage in 1952.

== History ==
=== Oldchurch ===
Romford's earliest known place of worship was a small chapel, dedicated to Saint Andrew, after its then-parish church of St Andrew, Hornchurch. The chapel was established in 1177 and was built near to the River Rom. The chapel existed into the late-14th century but it fell into ruin and was eventually demolished. The Oldchurch area, including Oldchurch Park and the former Oldchurch Hospital, takes its name from the old church of 1177.

=== Church of 1410 ===
A new church was built on the site of the present building towards the end of the 14th century; it was completed in 1410. The grounds were consecrated by Henry Chichele, Bishop of St David's, on 23 March of that year and was dedicated to the Virgin Mary and St Edward the Confessor. It had a chancel, a nave, an extended north aisle, which was longer than its predecessor by 28 ft and wider by 14 ft, and featured a brick tower which housed a ring of five bells. A gallery was later built within the west end part of the building in which a charity for orphaned children was later founded.

By 1710 the orphanage had become the St Edward's School and moved to a separate building in Romford's Market Place in 1728. Almost 30 years later a replacement weight driven clock was installed and three bells were added to the peal. The building remained in use until 1844 when work on a new church to the east of the Market Place (now the war memorial in Main Road) was started.

The new building in Main Road was designed by Edward Blore and existed as a chapel, only. Halfway through construction it was decided by the planners to relocate the town's church back to Market Place. The last services were held at the old church in Market Place in 1849 before it was demolished. Blore's chapel in Main Road remained and continued as a burial ground, hence the current collection of c. 19 headstones at the back of the park. Blore's chapel was eventually demolished in 1953.

=== Current building ===
The current building in Market Place was designed by the English architect John Johnson, who, in 1874, designed the Alexandra Palace and its associated buildings. The contractor for the new Church was John Kelk, with whom Johnson would often work. The foundation stone was laid on the 14 July 1849 by the conservative politician Thomas William Bramston, who was then the member of parliament for Romford. The church was consecrated on 19 September 1850 by George Murray, Bishop of Rochester. To pay for the construction, £2,500 was borrowed from financiers, £1,000 was given by New College, Oxford, and the remainder was donated through grants and private subscription. The total costs of the building was £8,000; (equates to £878,816 in 2025 (adjusted for inflation).

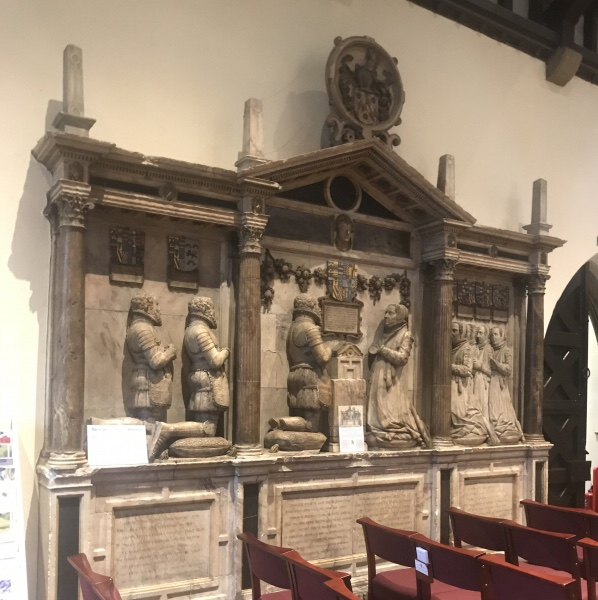
Memorial dedicated to Sir Anthony Cooke who died 1576

Johnson's designs were in the Gothic style of the 14th century. It was built using Kentish Ragstone with Bath stone dressings. Some of the materials came from John Nash's Quadrant in Regent Street, London, which was at that time being demolished. This may account for the many carved corbels depicting the heads of kings, queens, bishops, the Green Man, a veiled woman and sundry other heads with unusual head dresses. The stained glass window on the east of the building is by Charles Edmund Clutterbuck, whilst the three windows in the south chapel are by William Wailes. The wall that separates the churchyard from the Market Place may be contemporary and could date to around the time of the building of the second church in the 14th century.

The church sustained some minor damage in the Second World War. During the renovations a year later, in 1944, an electric clock and chime bells were installed, perhaps to replace the bells that had been requisitioned for the war effort. The church was recorded in the National Heritage List for England as a designated Grade II* listed building on 4 July 1952. By 1965 the school had moved to a new location in London Road and became a secondary school. A new organ was installed in the west gallery of the church in 1979, and five years later, the Church House was restored. A major renovation took place in 1988 which included the installation of under floor heating whilst the fixed pews were converted to free standing.

The church received a grant from the Pilling Trust in 2001 and a lavatory and kitchen facilities were added. The same year, an oak carving of St Edward the Confessor, was commissioned and installed in the main porch. The following year chairs replaced the free standing pews. The spire, 162 feet high, underwent major repair work in 1992.

== Interior ==
The church consists of a nave of five bays with clerestory, north and south aisles, chancel, Lady Chapel and west gallery. Two vestries were added in 1885. The south wall in the chancel features a monument to George Hervey, while on the north wall there is a memorial to Anthony Cook, which is attributed to the sculptor Cornelius Cure, or perhaps his father, William. On display is a silver communion plate introduced by the Camden Society and donated by a parishioner. It was manufactured by the jeweller and silversmith John Turner, of New Bond Street.

== Sources ==
- Cherry, Bridget; O'Brien, Charles; Pevsner, Nikolaus (2006). Pevsner Architectural Guides: Buildings of England. London: East. ISBN 978-0-3001-0701-2.
- Cooper, Janet (1994). Victoria County History, A History of the County of Essex. London: East. ISBN 978-0-1972-2784-8.
