= Coat of arms of the London Borough of Haringey =

Coat of arms of Haringey
- Armiger: Mayor and Burgesses of the London Borough of Haringey
- Adopted: 10 May 1965
- Motto: Progress with Humanity

The coat of arms of the London Borough of Haringey was granted on 10 May 1965, after the mergers of the former Municipal Borough of Hornsey, the Municipal Borough of Wood Green and the Municipal Borough of Tottenham. Unlike most other London boroughs, it was decided not to create arms based on the charges in the coats of arms of the former boroughs.

The coat of arms are coloured black and gold, representing stability. The only charges on the escutcheon are eight lightning rays issuing from the centre of the shield. The rays are intended to "symbolise action reaching out to the boundaries of the borough", but also represent the electromagnetic rays from the mast of the Alexandra Palace television station at Alexandra Palace, one of the landmarks in the Borough of Haringey, from where the world's first regular high-definition television transmissions were broadcast in 1936. The crest, depicted on a helm above the shield, consists of a cogwheel for industry and a rising sun for the new borough.

The arms is used in the mayoral regalia of the borough. The mayoral chain has the heraldic achievement hanging in a badge made out of 18 k gold and enamel, with the text "The London Borough of Haringey MCMLXV". The chain has stylized H's and hares sitting within laurel wreaths. The hares represent the name of the borough, since Haringey is believed to mean "a meadow of Hares".

The football club Haringey Borough F.C., founded in 1973, uses a logo (or "crest") similar to the arms but fashioned in green and with the club's name instead of the borough's motto.

The blazon reads "Sable eight rays issuing from the fess point throughout Or and for the crest on a wreath of colours in front of a demi-sun in splendour or a demi cogwheel sable".

The borough has a simple badge described as "Eight Rays" [as in the arms]. A flag is used which looks like a banner of arms but with the tinctures reversed, so that it has eight black rays on a yellow field.

== See also ==
- Armorial of London
