= St Luke's Church, Kentish Town =

Coordinates: 51.5484°N 0.1338°W

St Luke's Kentish Town
- St Luke's Kentish Town
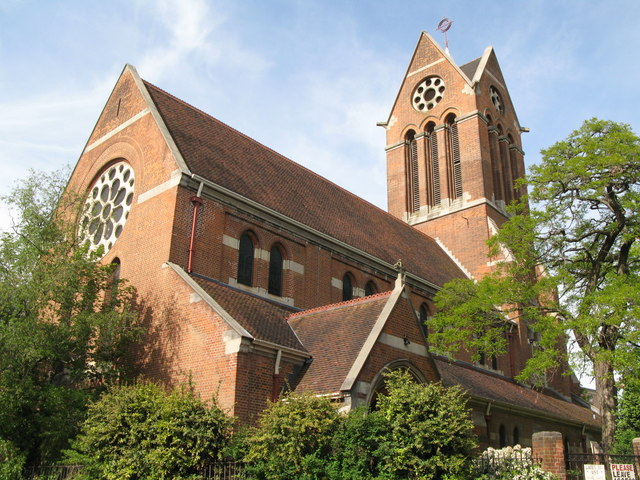
- The nave and tower of St Luke's Kentish Town

- Location in London
- Location: Kentish Town, London NW5 2AT
- Country: England
- Denomination: Anglican
- Website: www.slkt.org.uk

History
- Founded: 1867
- Dedication: Saint Luke
- Dedicated: 1867
- Consecrated: 1869

Architecture
- Heritage designation: Grade II*
- Designated: 10 June 1954
- Architect(s): Basil Champneys; HMDW Architects
- Architectural type: Church
- Style: Victorian
- Groundbreaking: 1867
- Completed: 1869

Specifications
- Materials: Red brick with stone dressings, red tile roof

Clergy
- Vicar: Jon March

St Luke's Kentish Town is an active Church of England parish church on Oseney Crescent in Kentish Town, North London, closed from 1991 to 2011 and now hosting a Holy Trinity Brompton church plant. The church has been designated by English Heritage as a Grade II* listed building,

== History ==
The church was built between 1867 and 1869 using £12,500 compensation provided by the railway company for the demolition of St Luke's Church, Euston Road, along with money from the sale of the church building on the Euston Road. John Johnson had built the church on Euston Road and hoped to be commissioned to design the new church in Kentish Town. However, he was disappointed when he was in fact passed over in favour of the 25-year-old Basil Champneys. It was his first church and one of his first buildings. His father, William Weldon Champneys, who commissioned the church, was the vicar of the parish of St Pancras.

The original construction phase included the three east stained glass windows designed by Henry Holiday and made by Heaton, Butler and Bayne. The same company produced the c. 1880-1890 aisle windows of the twelve apostles and the 1891 west window, whilst a Willis organ was installed in 1893. Morris & Co. produced four more stained glass windows for the south clerestory in 1910 - two are taken from figures by Edward Burne-Jones and two by John Henry Dearle.

A reredos added in the 1930s and in 1955 the benefice was merged with that of St Paul's Camden Square, an arrangement that lasted until 1987. St Luke's present brass eagle lectern dates to 1882 and originally came from St Paul's, which had been war-damaged. The building closed in 1991 and was handed over to the Churches Conservation Trust.

=== Present day ===
In 2011, the church re-opened via a pastoral measure naming the Revd Jonathan March as the new parish priest. Renovation work by HTB was completed in January 2012 and services have recommenced as of 29 January 2012.

== Architecture ==
=== Exterior ===
The exterior of the church is largely red brick with stone dressings, and the roof is tiled. The tower with its saddleback gabled roof is in the North German style, with three arcaded openings to the belfry and plate tracery above. The detail of the nave, chancel and aisles is Early English revival.

The nave has four bays with narrow aisles. The chancel is situated beneath the tower. It has a polygonal apse with plate tracery. The west end has three lancet windows, with a plate tracery rose window above. The aisles and clerestory have pointed windows in pairs.

=== Interior ===
The walls are of exposed red brick with two bands of stone. The nave arcades have low cylindrical pillars. Between the arches are shafts which support the principal roof timbers. The floor is paved with red and black tiles. From the crossing, there are three steps up to the brick-vaulted chancel and a further six steps up to the sanctuary, which has decorative tiles and sedilia.

== Stance on LGBT people ==
A woman has said she was forced out of a church congregation after coming out as a lesbian. The woman's case left her needing three years of counselling. An investigation into St Luke's Church in Oseney Crescent and its vicar has since taken place. She had been a regular at the church – part of the Holy Trinity Brompton (HTB) network – but was frozen out after coming out to Reverend Jon March in 2019. Fr Robert Thompson supported the woman. Thompson said that the requirement for celibacy did not apply to lay people – people who are not ordained – and only to clergy. The woman shared about how the experience resulted in Post-traumatic stress disorder.

The Diocese of London, who led the investigation into St Luke's, said it was providing ongoing support to the woman and took the complaint seriously. In a new statement, a spokeswoman defended Rev March and said he had been “open and helpful throughout the process”, adding: “He continues to work closely with the Bishop of Edmonton on a positive way forward for the parish.” The woman's complaints about how her situation was subsequently handled by Mr March and his church form the basis of an informal investigation conducted by the Ven. Rosemary Lain-Priestley, who is an adviser to the Bishop of London, the Rt Revd Sarah Mullally. Archdeacon Lain-Priestley was given the task of responding to a brief sent by the Bishop of Edmonton, the Rt Revd Rob Wickham, in April 2020, on the extent to which Mr March conformed to or breached the guidelines for professional clergy conduct when responding to the woman about her sexuality and leadership. An inquiry found that St Luke's had been negligent in its treatment of the woman. The report found that Rev March's idea of “beyond reproach” may have excluded the woman from her position, and admitted pastoral failings, but cleared him of abuse of power. The inquiry quoted Mr March as saying: “It is by far one of my biggest regrets. It was lacking. It was thought about but we came to the wrong side of a wrong decision, a bad call.” Among the recommendations from the report are St Luke's putting together a policy on sex and relationships, but stops short of saying it should be published. It said that Mr March would benefit from, and has agreed to, training in handling “difficult conversations” on conflict on this or similar issues. Some of the measures have been delayed by the COVID-19 pandemic and others, including a risk assessment for LGBT+ and vulnerable people, have not been carried out.

== Gallery ==
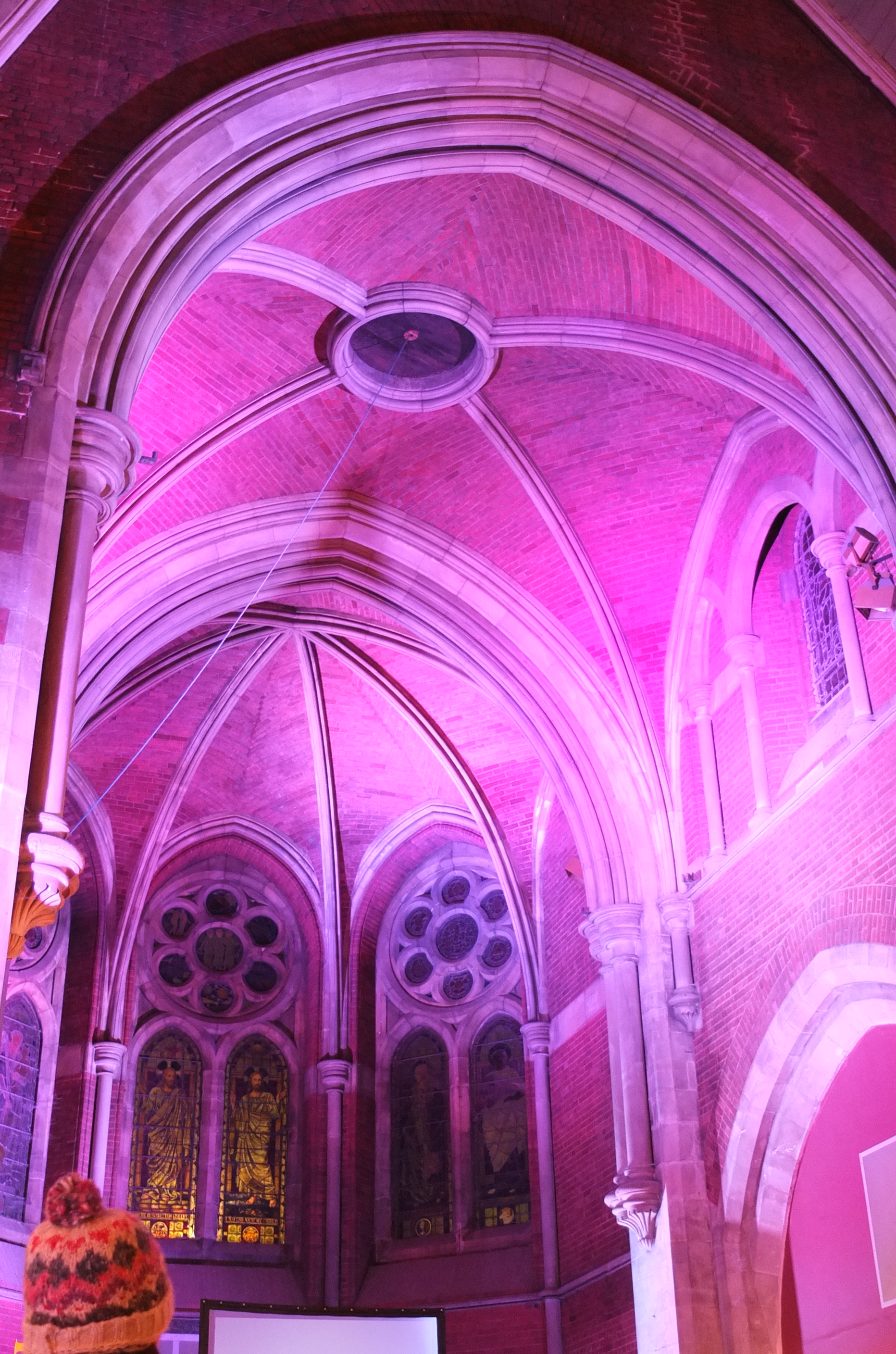
Vaulting of the chancel, featuring the Christmas opening service lighting, 18th Dec 2011

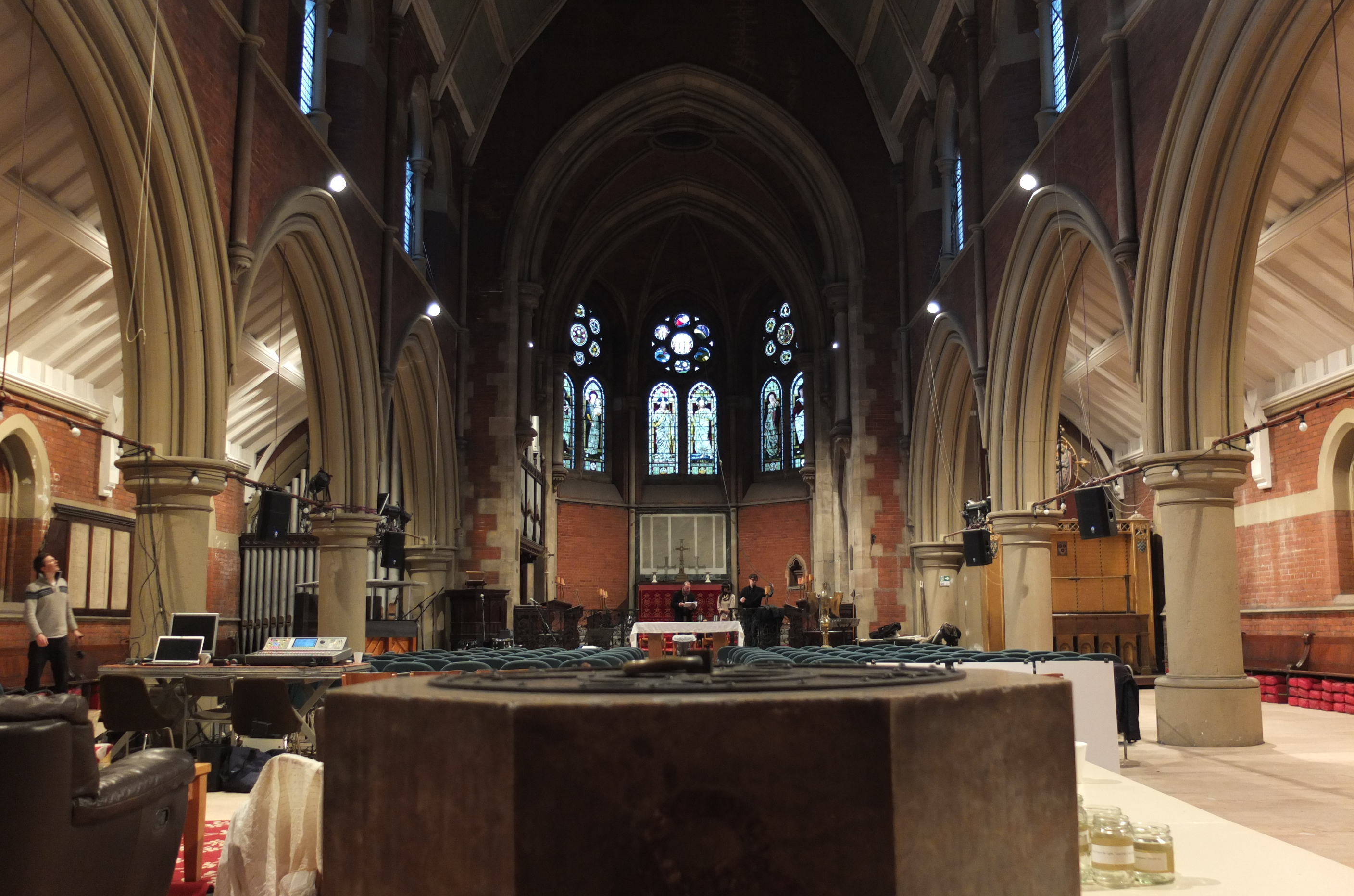
Facing east in the nave; the font in the foreground

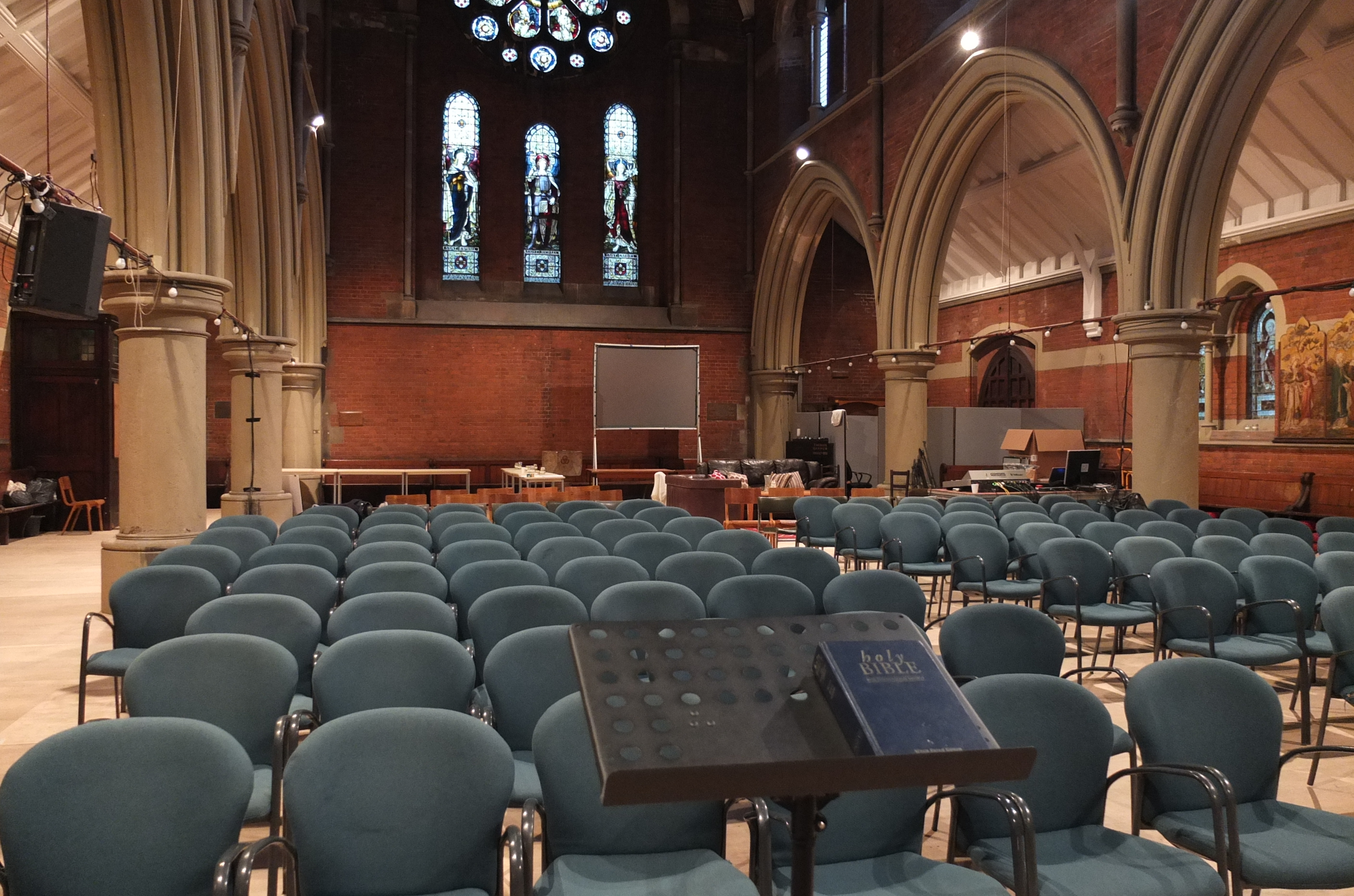
Facing west in the nave

== See also ==
- HTB network
