= Wanstead United Reformed Church =

Church building in Wanstead, London

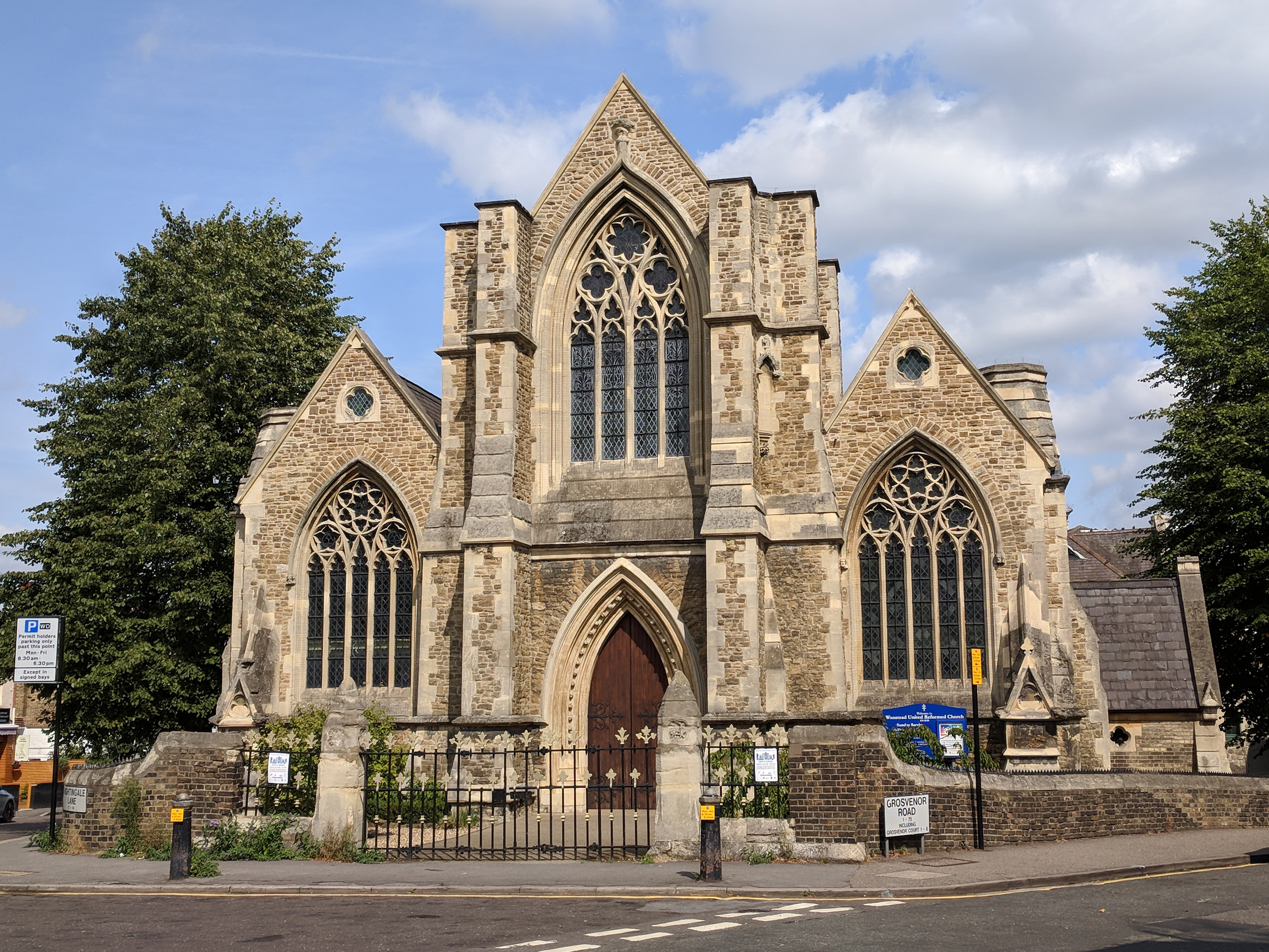
Wanstead United Reformed Church

Wanstead United Reformed Church is a United Reformed place of worship in Wanstead, east London.

It was originally built as St Luke's Church, on a site in Euston Road, St Pancras, London, in 1856-61, to the design of John Johnson.

In 1866-67, it was dismantled and re-erected in modified form on its present site, also to a design by Johnson, to make way for St Pancras Station.

It was designated as a Grade II listed building in 2009.

== St Luke's Church, Euston Road ==
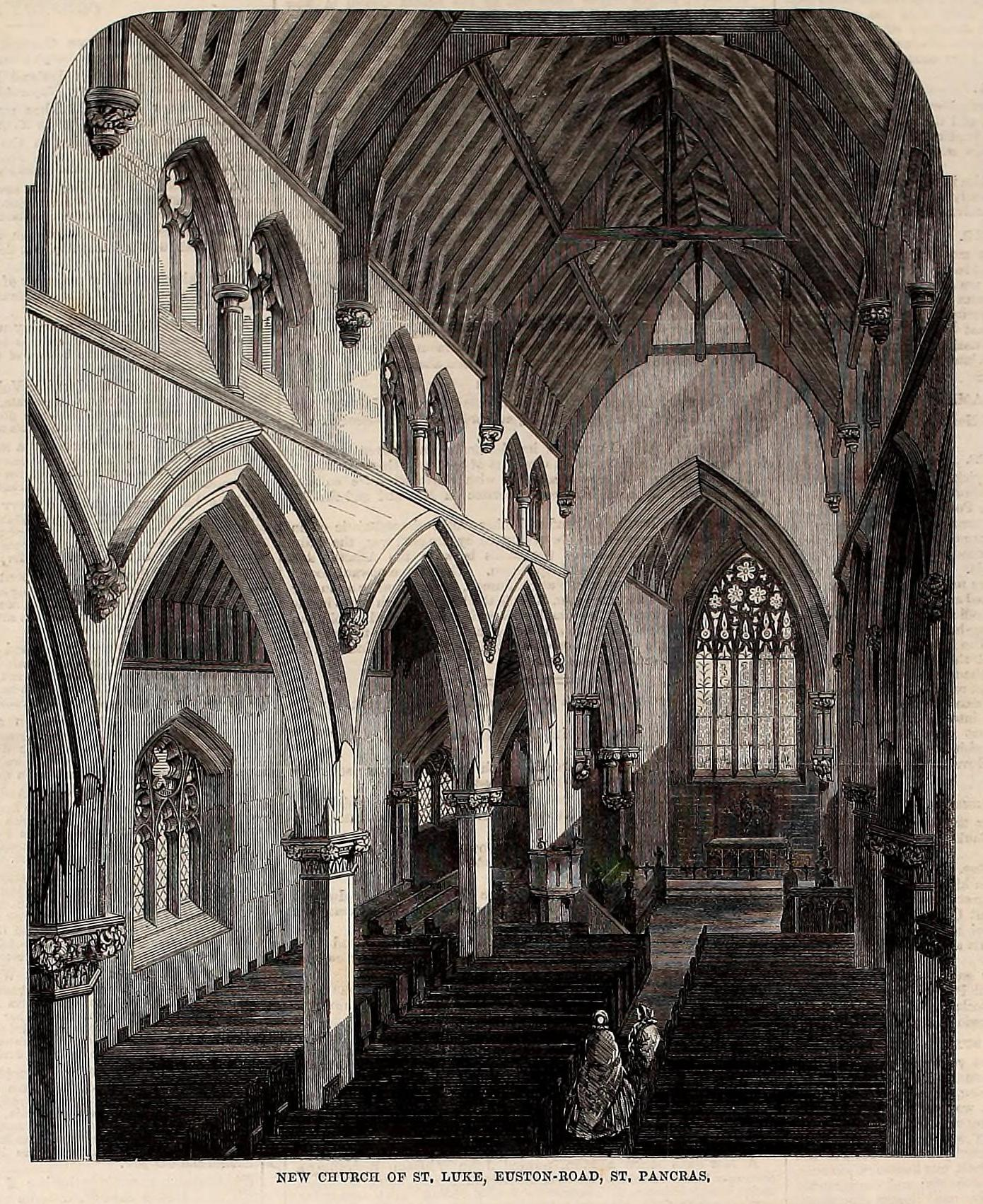
Interior of the new church of St Luke's, Euston Road, St. Pancras in 1861

St Luke's Church, Euston Road (51°31′47″N 0°07′31″W) was a Church of England parish church on the Euston Road in St Pancras, London.

It was designed by John Johnson, also one of the architects of St Paul's Church, Camden Square. It was built in between 1856 and 1861 on the corner of Midland Road. The construction in the 1860s of the Midland Railway's London terminus, St Pancras railway station, necessitated the church's demolition. It was taken down and re-erected in 1866–67, with alterations by Johnson, as Wanstead United Reformed Church. Its sale to Wanstead provided £526 which was combined with £12,500 compensation from the railway company to build a replacement in Kentish Town.
