= Tidworth =

Garrison town in Wiltshire, England

Coordinates: 51.237°N 1.664°W

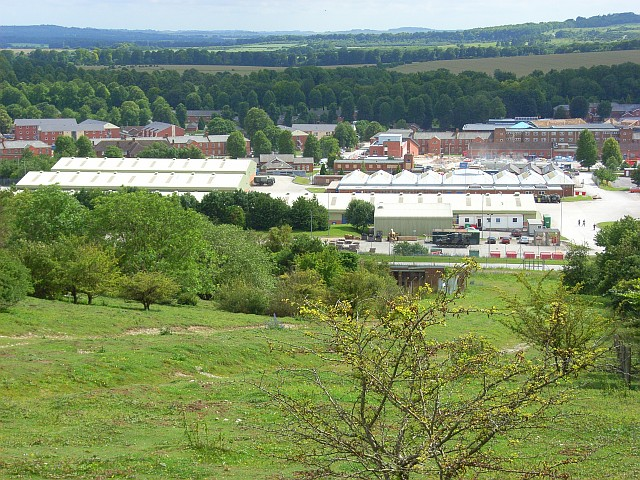
- Tidworth Camp: a view over the garrison from Clarendon Hill

- Location within Wiltshire
- Population: 12,089 (2021 Census)
- OS grid reference: SU2348
- Unitary authority: Wiltshire
- Ceremonial county: Wiltshire
- Region: South West
- Country: England
- Sovereign state: United Kingdom
- Post town: TIDWORTH
- Postcode district: SP9
- Dialling code: 01980
- Police: Wiltshire
- Fire: Dorset and Wiltshire
- Ambulance: South Western
- UK Parliament: East Wiltshire
- Website: Town Council

Tidworth is a garrison town and civil parish in south-east Wiltshire, England, on the eastern edge of Salisbury Plain. Lying on both sides of the A338 about 3 1/2 miles (5.6 km) north of the A303 primary route, the town is approximately 8 miles (13 km) west of Andover, 12 miles (19 km) south of Marlborough, and 13 miles (21 km) north by north-east of Salisbury. The population of the parish at the 2011 census was approximately 10,600.

Originally two villages – North Tidworth and South Tidworth – the modern town is dominated by Tidworth Camp, a large British Army site. Swinton Barracks, another Army site, is in the west of the parish.

== History ==
Evidence of prehistoric activity in the area is in the form of several sites with bowl barrows, including a group of seven; and an Iron Age hillfort at Sidbury Hill in the north of the parish.

The name Tidworth derives from the Old English tudaworð meaning 'Tuda's enclosure'.

Domesday Book of 1086 recorded four landowners and 18 households at what is now North Tidworth, in the Amesbury hundred of Wiltshire; and three landowners with 20 households and one church at South Tidworth, in the Broughton hundred of Hampshire. Placenames were written as Todeworde, Tedorde or Todeorde.

The two villages developed in the valley of the small River Bourne, which flows south to join the Hampshire Avon near Salisbury; later the Oxford-Salisbury road also followed the valley.

On John Speed's maps of 1611 the villages are North Tudworth, belonging to Amesbury hundred in "Wilshire", and South Tudworth within Andover hundred in "Hamshire". Before 1650 there was a substantial country house with parkland at South Tidworth; the present Tedworth House is a rebuilding of 1828–1830.

In 1897 the War Office bought the house and grounds, together with land to the north which gave access to Salisbury Plain for Army training. Extensive barracks were built in the early 20th century, largely in South Tidworth but spreading across the boundary to the north. From 1902 to 1963 there was a railway station at North Tidworth, connected to the main line by a branch from Ludgershall.

North and South were separate ecclesiastical parishes, and therefore became civil parishes in the 19th century. An Ordnance Survey map of 1958 labels the parishes as North Tidworth and South Tedworth. When the boundary between Wiltshire and Hampshire was redrawn in 1992, the entire town became part of Wiltshire, though remaining part of the Hampshire postal county. The two parts remained as separate civil parishes until 1 April 2004.

In the 21st century the population of the town increased as the barracks now known as Tidworth Camp expanded, in particular following the return of units from Germany in 2019 and 2020 under the Army Basing Plan.

== Religious sites ==
=== Parish church ===
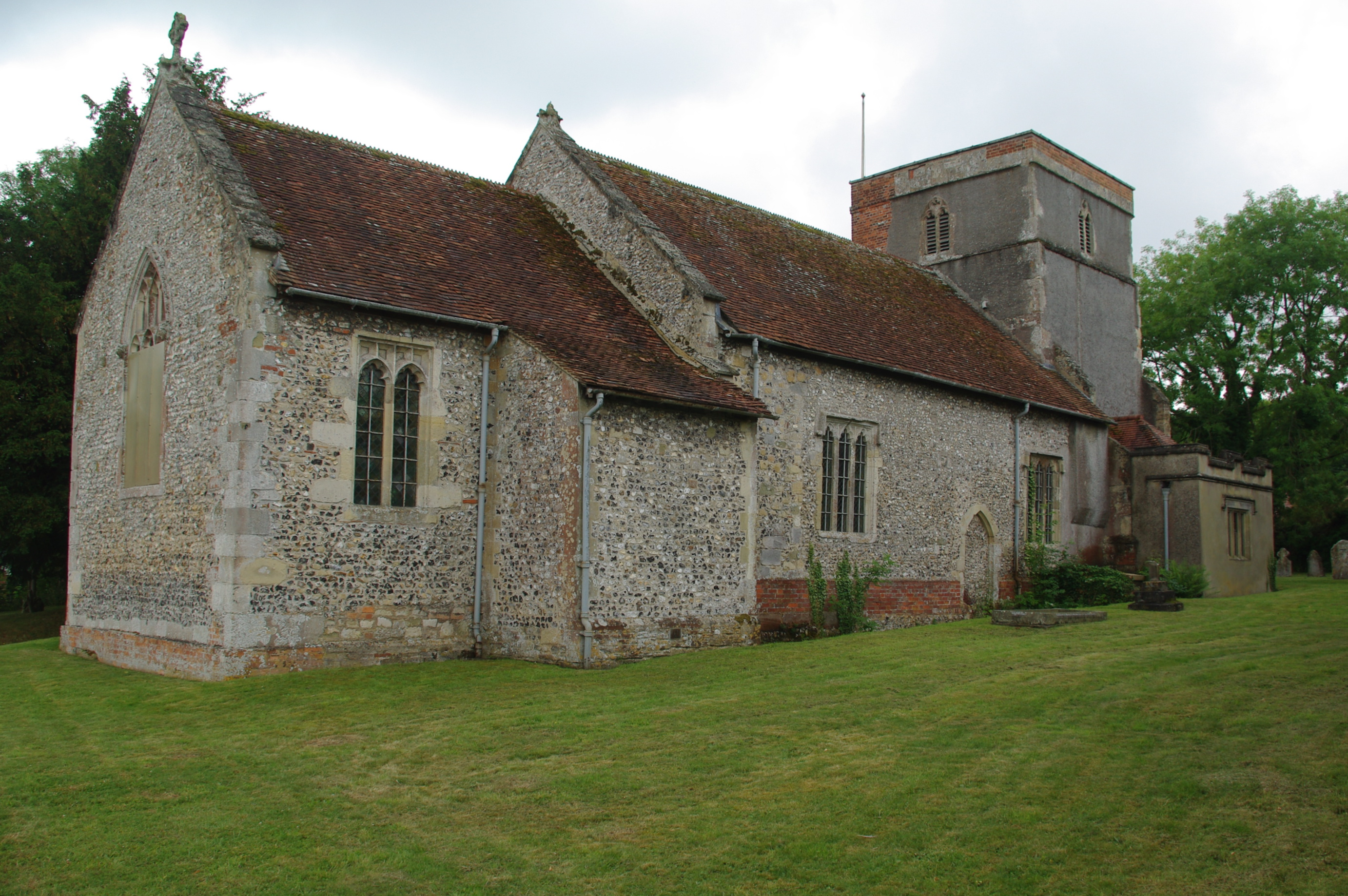
Holy Trinity, North Tidworth

Holy Trinity, North Tidworth is the Church of England parish church. There may have been a church here in the 12th century but the earliest record is of 1291. The present building, in flint and stone with repairs in red brick, is from the late 14th and 15th centuries. Restoration designed by J. L. Pearson in 1882 included replacement of the roofs and rebuilding of the porch. The church was recorded as Grade II* listed in 1988.

The font is from the 12th century. Three of the six bells were cast in 1619 by John Wallis, and another is from 1700. There are two 17th-century chest tombs in the churchyard. Parish registers from 1700 are held by the Wiltshire and Swindon History Centre, Chippenham.

The Hampshire benefices of South Tidworth and Shipton Bellinger were united in 1926, with the incumbent to live at Tidworth, although the parishes remained separate. In 1972 Shipton Bellinger was made a separate benefice, the parishes of North and South Tidworth were united, and the Victorian church at South Tidworth was declared redundant. The benefice was united with the parish of Ludgershall and Faberstown in 1986.

=== Others ===
There was a church dedicated to St Mary at South Tidworth from the 13th or 14th centuries, but by 1784 it was in poor condition and Thomas Assheton Smith the elder, owner of Tedworth House, was given permission to demolish it. Masonry from the church, including a 14th-century window and some monuments, was used to build a small chapel which remains in use as a mortuary chapel for the surrounding cemetery.

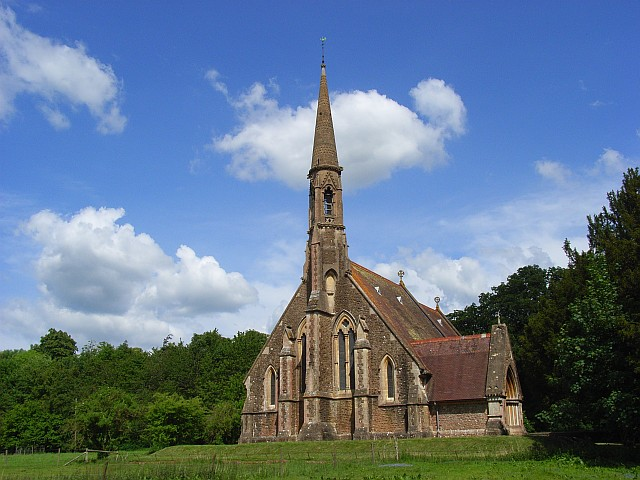
St Mary's Church, South Tidworth

A replacement St Mary's Church was built closer to Tedworth House in 1878 to designs of John Johnson at the expense of Sir John Kelk, who had bought the estate in 1877. It is Grade I listed and is now in the care of the Churches Conservation Trust.

St Michael's Garrison Church (Church of England) and St Patrick's Garrison Church (Roman Catholic), both built in 1912, are the military churches for the garrison.

== Governance ==
The parish elects a town council. It is in the area of Wiltshire Council unitary authority, which is responsible for most local government functions. Tidworth elects two members of Wiltshire Council: one for Tidworth North & West which covers most of the town, including Tidworth Camp, and one for Tidworth East & Ludgershall South which takes in a small eastern part of the town as well as Perham Down and the southern half of Ludgershall.

For Westminster elections, the parish falls in the East Wiltshire constituency, which has been represented since 2024 by Danny Kruger for the Conservatives.

== Amenities ==
Tidworth has a small commercial area containing two supermarkets (a Lidl and a large Tesco), two veterinary surgeries, a pharmacy, and other shops and services. A dental surgery serves Tidworth and the surrounding area, covering approximately 5,000 people. In 2003 a new medical centre was completed, the cost being split between the Ministry of Defence and the NHS, as it serves the armed forces and their dependants within the surrounding area.

Castledown FM, a community radio station, broadcasts to Tidworth and Ludgershall from studios in the grounds of Wellington Academy.

Tidworth has one of the lowest crime rates per thousand in Wiltshire, and between 1990 and 2004 only one major crime took place. In 2014, it was rated by the Royal Mail as the most attractive postcode area of England to live in.

Tidworth Garrison Golf Club was constructed in 1904 initially for use by army officers. It was established in 1908 and gradually made available to all ranks and civilians. In 2000 it became a limited company.

Tidworth Polo Club also known as Tedworth Park Polo Club is south of Tedworth House. The ground is central to the British Army Polo Association and is affiliated to the UK Armed Forces Polo Association.

South of Tidworth is a downhill mountain biking venue, first built in secret by the local mountain biking community in 2006. After the landowner discovered the site and forced the issue, Tidworth Freeride was taken over by B1KE, who now operate the site commercially, catering to a wide range of abilities.

== Education ==
The Wellington Academy, a secondary school which was partly sponsored by Wellington College, opened in September 2009, replacing Castledown School. The academy has a sixth form college, an all-weather sports pitch, and dedicated Combined Cadet Force facilities. The parent unit of the CCF is 26 Royal Engineers, housed nearby at Swinton Barracks.

The community is served by three primary schools and an infant school.

== Media ==
Local news and television programmes are provided by BBC South and ITV Meridian. Television signals are received from the Hannington and the local relay transmitters.

Local radio stations are BBC Radio Wiltshire on 103.5 FM, Greatest Hits Radio Salisbury on 102 FM and British Forces Broadcasting Service that provides radio programmes for His Majesty's Armed Forces in nearby Salisbury Plain on 106.8 FM.

The local newspapers that cover the town is the Salisbury Journal and Andover Advertiser.

== Notable residents ==
Duggie Fields, artist, was born in Tidworth, as was musician James Blunt in 1974.

Owners of the South Tidworth estate and Tedworth House include John Smith (1656–1723), Speaker of the House of Commons and Chancellor of the Exchequer; Thomas Assheton Smith (1752–1828), owner of Dinorwic quarry and MP; and his son Thomas (1776–1858), cricketer, foxhunter, yacht designer and MP, who built the present house.

== See also ==
- Drummer of Tedworth – alleged 17th-century poltergeist
