= Alfred Meeson =

British architect and surveyor

Alfred Meeson (4 April 1808 – 12 January 1885) was a British architect and surveyor. He assisted Charles Barry in the construction of the Houses of Parliament in London, and was involved with the erection of other notable buildings.

== Life ==
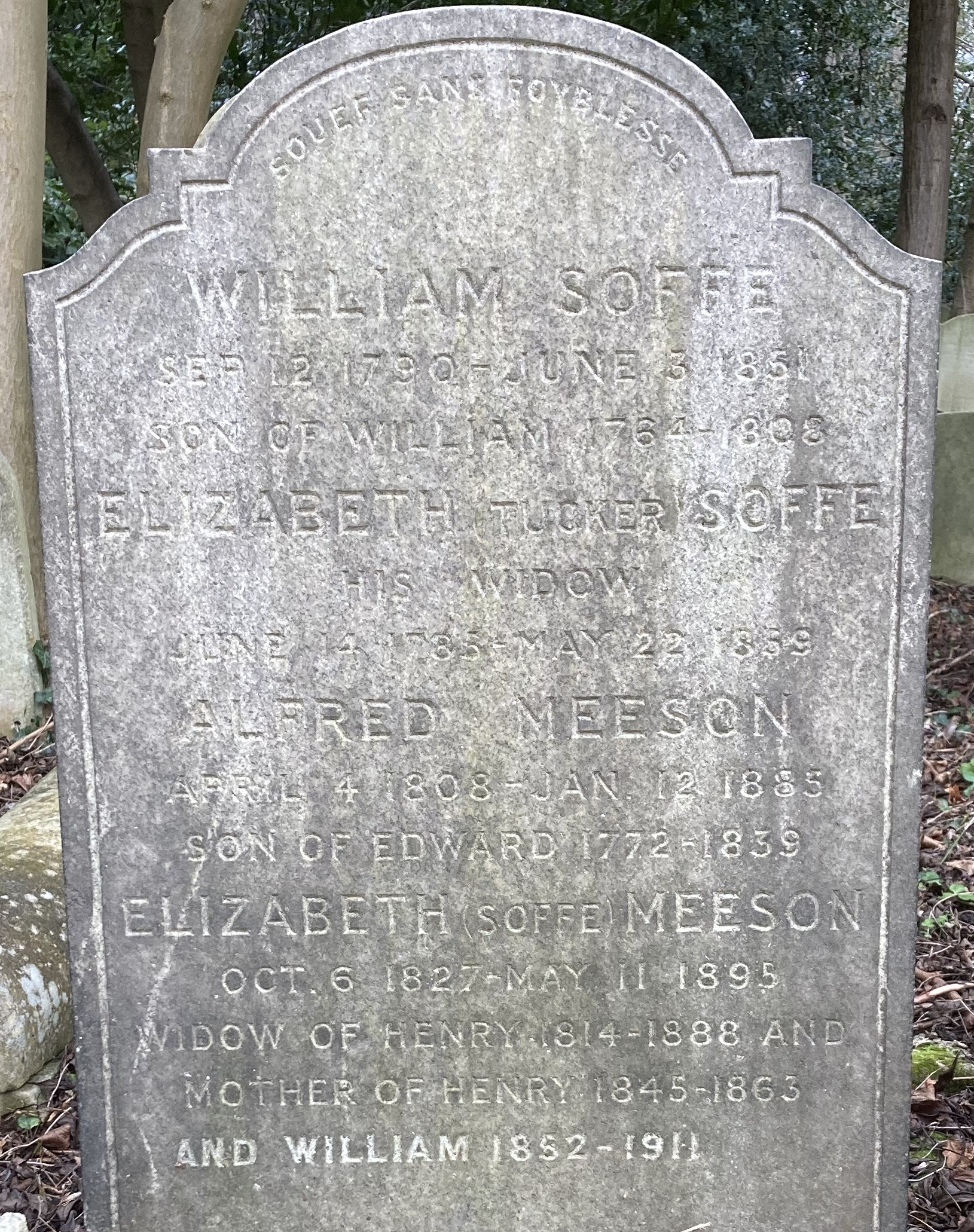
Grave of Alfred Meeson in Highgate Cemetery

Meeson was born and educated in London, and spent the earlier part of his life in private practice as architect and surveyor in Wakefield, Yorkshire. In 1842 he came to London at the request of the architect Charles Barry, to superintend the constructional and engineering details of the new Houses of Parliament, and continued to act as Barry's assistant until the completion of the work. In 1853 he was appointed engineer in charge of the Houses of Parliament, with a residence in the building. On the abolition of that post he continued in private practice in Pall Mall.

He had a great reputation as a surveyor and consulting engineer, and was employed on the international exhibitions of 1851 and 1862, and on the erection of Covent Garden Theatre, the Albert Hall, and other important public works. He was co-architect with John Johnson on both the original and the rebuilt Alexandra Palace on Muswell Hill after its destruction by fire.

Meeson died unmarried in 1885 in South Hampstead, London.
