= John Johnson (architect, born 1807) =

English architect (1807–1878)

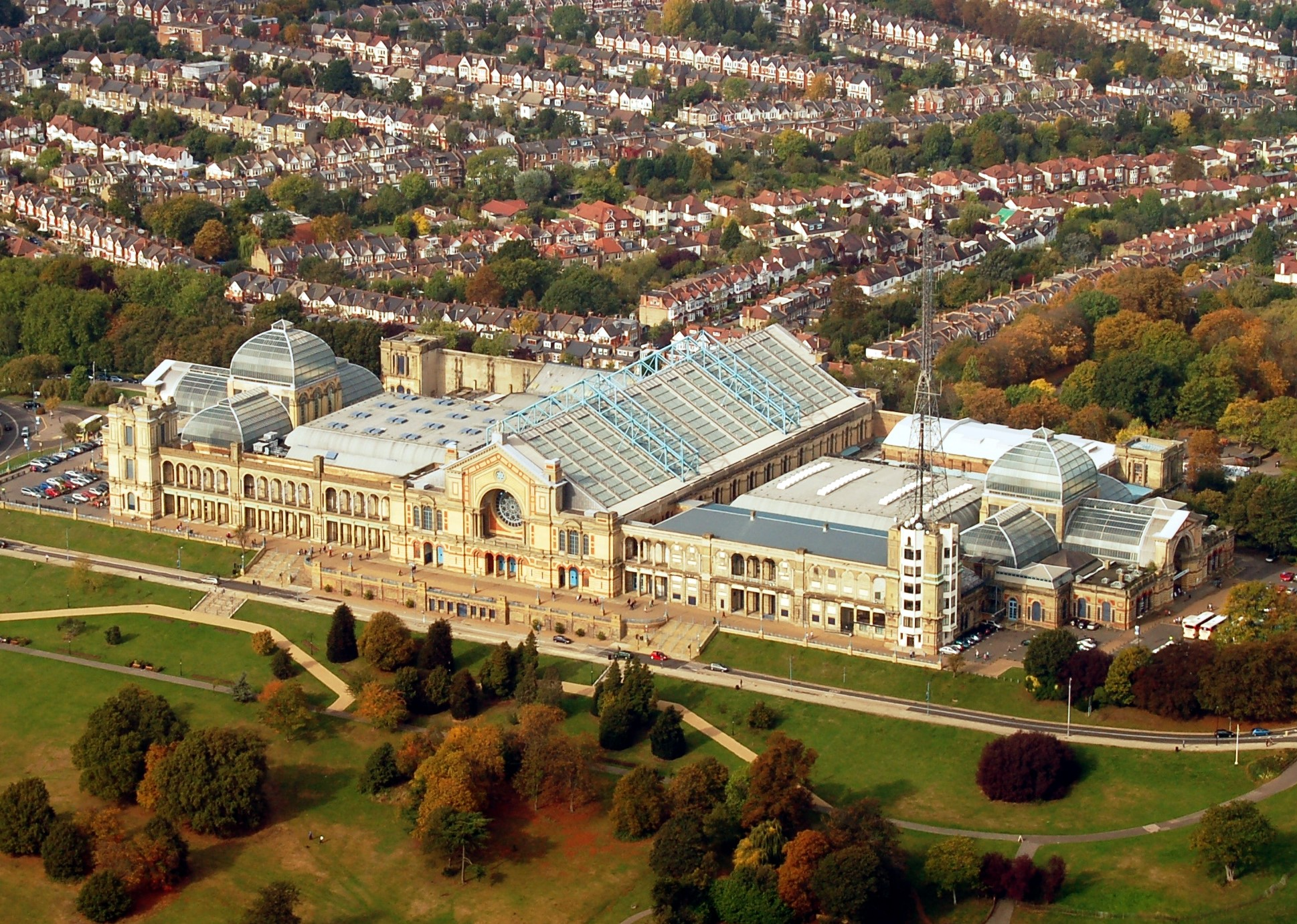
Alexandra Palace, designed by John Johnson and Alfred Meeson

John Johnson (1807 – 28 December 1878) was an English architect who specialised in religious buildings and churches in the Gothic style. He was regularly employed by the civil engineer Sir John Kelk to design the homes and public buildings Kelk funded. Johnson is best known for his collaboration with Alfred Meeson on designs for Alexandra Palace in north London; his designs for the Church of St Edward the Confessor in Romford, Essex; and for the Grade I listed St Mary's Church in Tidworth, Wiltshire, which was completed the year he died.

One of Johnson's churches – St Luke's Church, Euston Road – was bought by Midland Railway and dismantled to make way for St Pancras railway station. It was re-erected by Johnson in Wanstead where it became Wanstead United Reformed Church. Johnson's participation in the work gave him the distinction of becoming one of a small number of architects to have undertaken such a move and subsequent reconstruction.

== Career ==
=== Churches ===
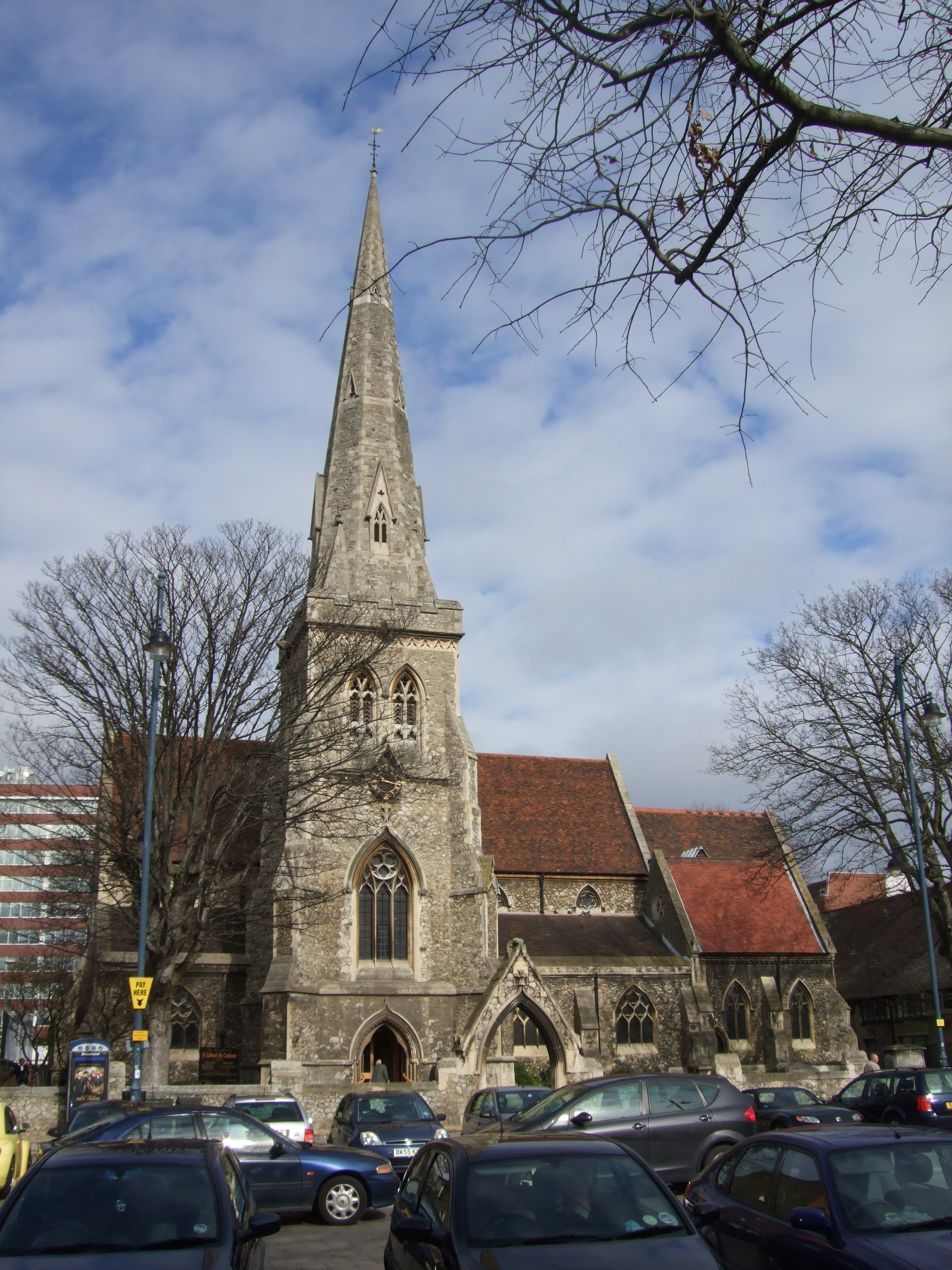
St Edward the Confessor Church in Romford, Essex

Johnson was a prolific designer of religious buildings and churches. In 1849 he was instructed to design the Church of St Edward the Confessor in Romford, Essex, and returned in 1864 to complete his second church in the town, St Andrew's, in what is now the Waterloo Estate. In 1853 he took on the rebuilding of the parish church of All Saints in Beyton, Suffolk, which retained the medieval core and tower.

Johnson created the original designs for St Luke's Church, Euston Road, between 1856 and 1861. In 1866 it was dismantled and re-designed by Johnson, and re-erected as a Congregational church in Wanstead. The church was relocated because of the purchase of land by the Midland Railway, which obtained an Act of Parliament in 1863 to extend its line to London and build a new terminus, (which became St Pancras railway station) on the land occupied by Johnson's church. It was described by Historic England as "one of few examples of churches which have been moved and substantially reconstructed to their original form, and by the original architect".

Other religious buildings followed, including the Old Vicarage in Oakley Square, Camden, in 1861; the Unitarian Chapel, Hampstead, in 1862; and St Andrews Church in Hertford in 1875. One of his final churches was St Mary's Church in Tidworth, Wiltshire, which was completed in the year in which Johnson died. It is his only Grade I listed building.

=== Public and private buildings ===
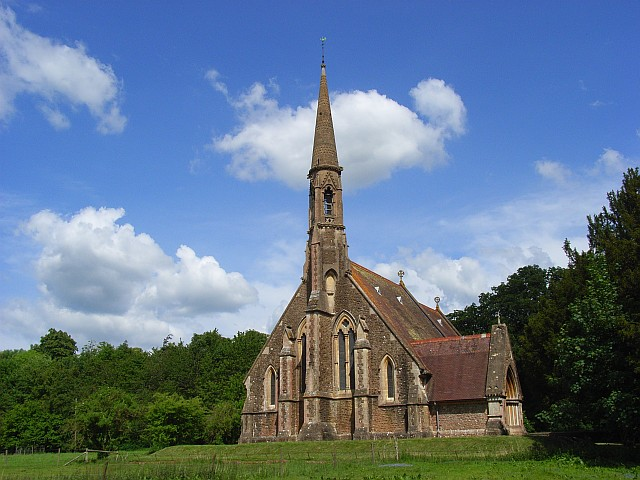
St Mary's in South Tidworth, Wiltshire

Johnson was closely associated with the civil engineer Sir John Kelk (1816–1886) who instructed Johnson to complete the Army and Navy Club in St James's Square, London; Kelk's personal residence at 3 Grosvenor Square, London; and St Mary's Church, which was built on Kelk's estate in Tidworth, Wiltshire.

Kelk and Johnson worked together in 1862 as part of the Kensington Exhibition, and again on the construction of Alexandra Palace, which Johnson co-designed with Alfred Meeson (1808–1885). The palace burnt down in 1873 and Johnson and Meeson designed the new building which exists to this day. Kelk personally funded the project and used the contractors Charles and Thomas Lucas to construct the property.

== Personal life ==
Little is recorded of Johnson's private life; he enjoyed fishing, and was for ten years on the committee of the Thames Angling Preservation Society. On 1 July 1865, his only child, John George, a second assistant engineer aboard HMS Weazel, died aged 28 through drowning whilst the boat was docked in Shanghai.

== Death and legacy ==
Johnson died at the age of 71 on 28 December 1878 at his home, 14 Buckingham Street, near the Strand, London. Probate was granted to his executors, Lewis Edward Younghusband of 91 Highbury New Park, Middlesex, the sculptor Edward Bowring Stephens of 110 Buckingham Palace Road, Middlesex, and Alfred Godwin of 3 King's Bench Walk, Temple.
