= Alexandra Palace television station =

Television transmission site in north London

Alexandra Palace
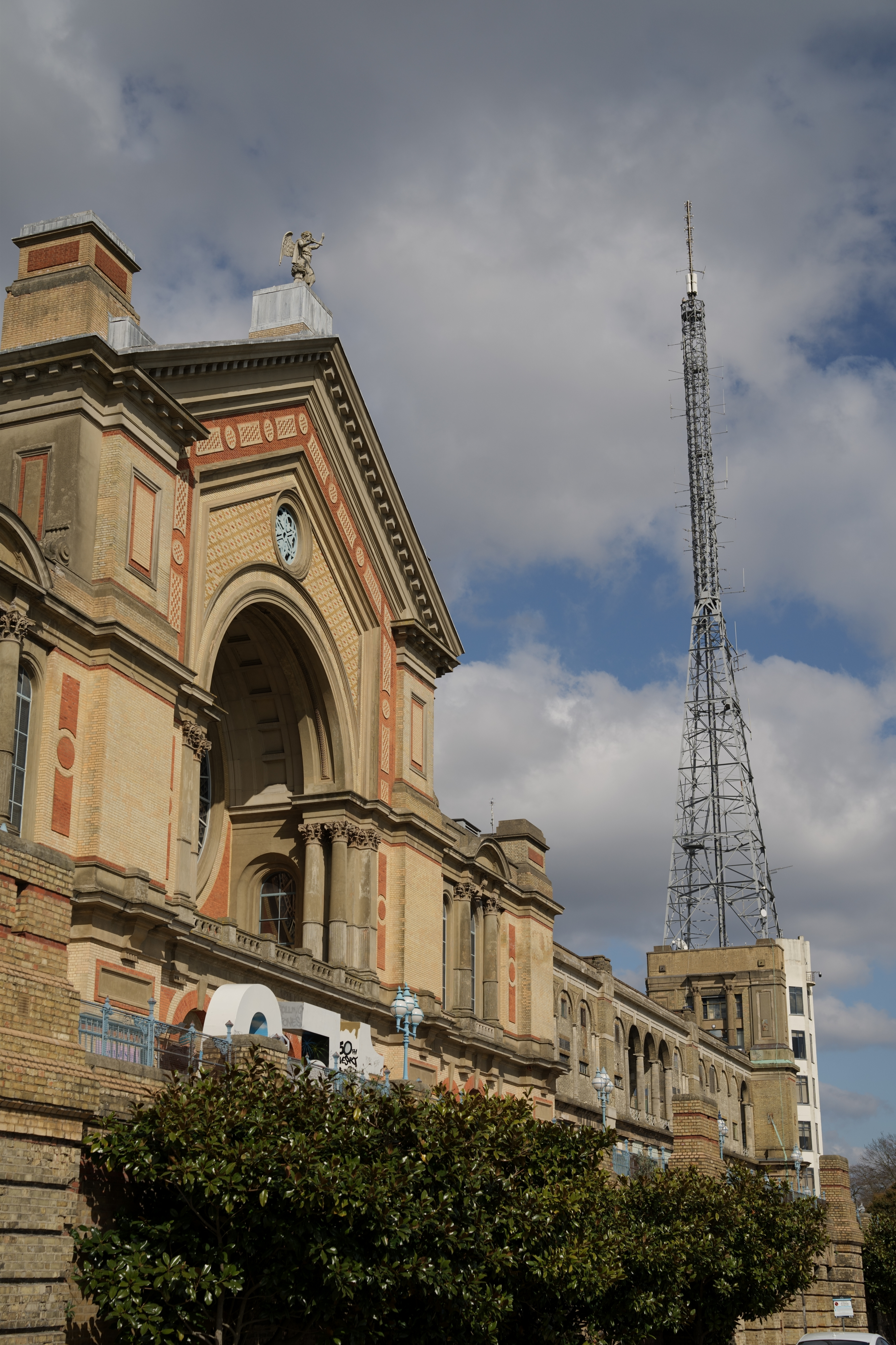
- Alexandra Palace and its transmission mast, photographed in 2025

- Tower height: 65.5 metres (215 ft)
- Coordinates: 51°35′40″N 0°07′45″W
- Grid reference: TQ297901
- Built: 1936
- Relay of: Crystal Palace
- BBC region: BBC London
- ITV region: ITV London
- Local TV service: London Live

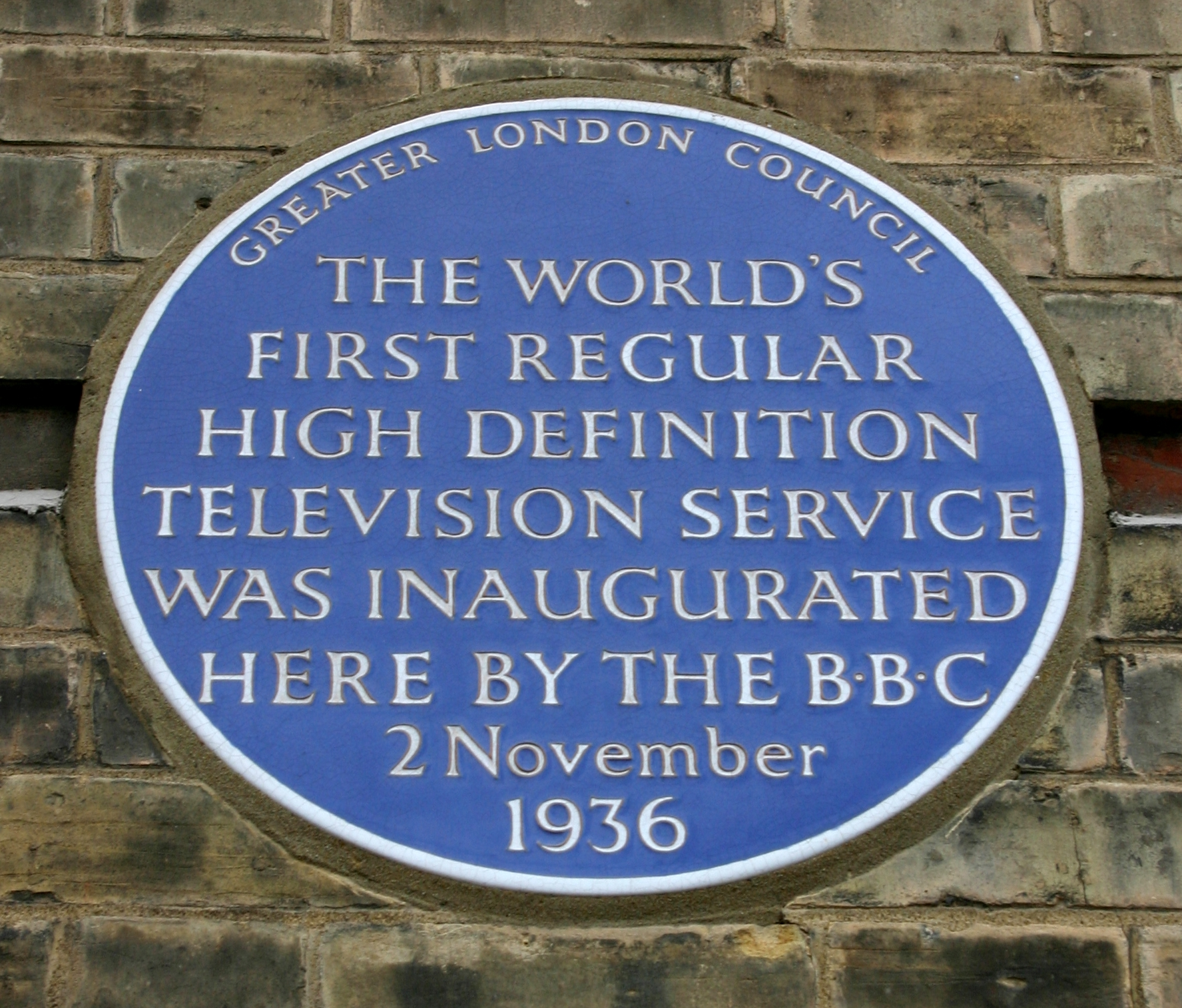
Blue plaque at Alexandra Palace commemorating the start of regular television service

The Alexandra Palace television station in North London (grid reference TQ297901) is the oldest television transmission site in the world. What was at the time called "high definition" (405-line), the world's first TV broadcasts on VHF were beamed from this mast from 1936 until the outbreak of World War II. It then lay dormant until it was used very successfully to foil the German Y-Gerät radio navigation system during the last stages of the Battle of Britain. After the war, it was reused for television until 1956, when it was superseded by the opening of the BBC's new main transmitting station for the London area at Crystal Palace. In 1982 Alexandra Palace became an active transmitting station again, with the opening of a relay transmitter to provide UHF television service to parts of North London poorly covered from Crystal Palace.

The transmitter is owned and maintained by Arqiva.

== Channels listed by frequency ==
=== Analogue radio (FM) ===
Frequency	kW	Service
103.3 MHz	0.05	London Greek Radio
107.1 MHz	0.1	Capital Xtra

=== Digital radio (DAB) ===
Frequency	Block	kW	Operator
218.640 MHz	11B	0.2	DRG London
222.064 MHz	11D	2	Digital One
223.936 MHz	12A	0.1	Switch London
225.648 MHz	12B	3.2	BBC National DAB
227.360 MHz	12C	0.25	CE London

=== Digital television ===
Digital television replaced the analogue television signals during the digital switchover of April 2012-2013. However, only 3 of the 6 multiplexes are available: BBC A & B and Digital 3&4.

BBC A launched on UHF 61 on 4 April on 2012, before moving to its final allocation of UHF 49 on 18 April, when BBC B and Digital 3&4 launched. As part of the 700 MHz clearance programme the UHF channel numbers were changed in March 2018.

Frequency	UHF	kW	Operator	System
554.000 MHz	31	0.07	BBC A	DVB-T
602.000 MHz	37	0.07	BBC B	DVB-T2
562.000 MHz	32	0.07	Digital 3&4	DVB-T

=== Analogue television ===
Analogue television is no longer transmitted from Alexandra Palace. BBC Two was closed on UHF 64 on 4 April 2012, when ITV1 temporarily moved into its frequency. The remaining three analogue services closed down on 18 April 2012.

Frequency	UHF	kW	Service
735.25 MHz	54	0.065	Channel 4
767.25 MHz	58	0.065	BBC1
791.25 MHz	61	0.065	ITV London
815.25 MHz	64	0.065	BBC2

- Aerial group: C/D
- Polarisation: horizontal
