= Alexandra Palace =

Listed entertainment and sports venue in London

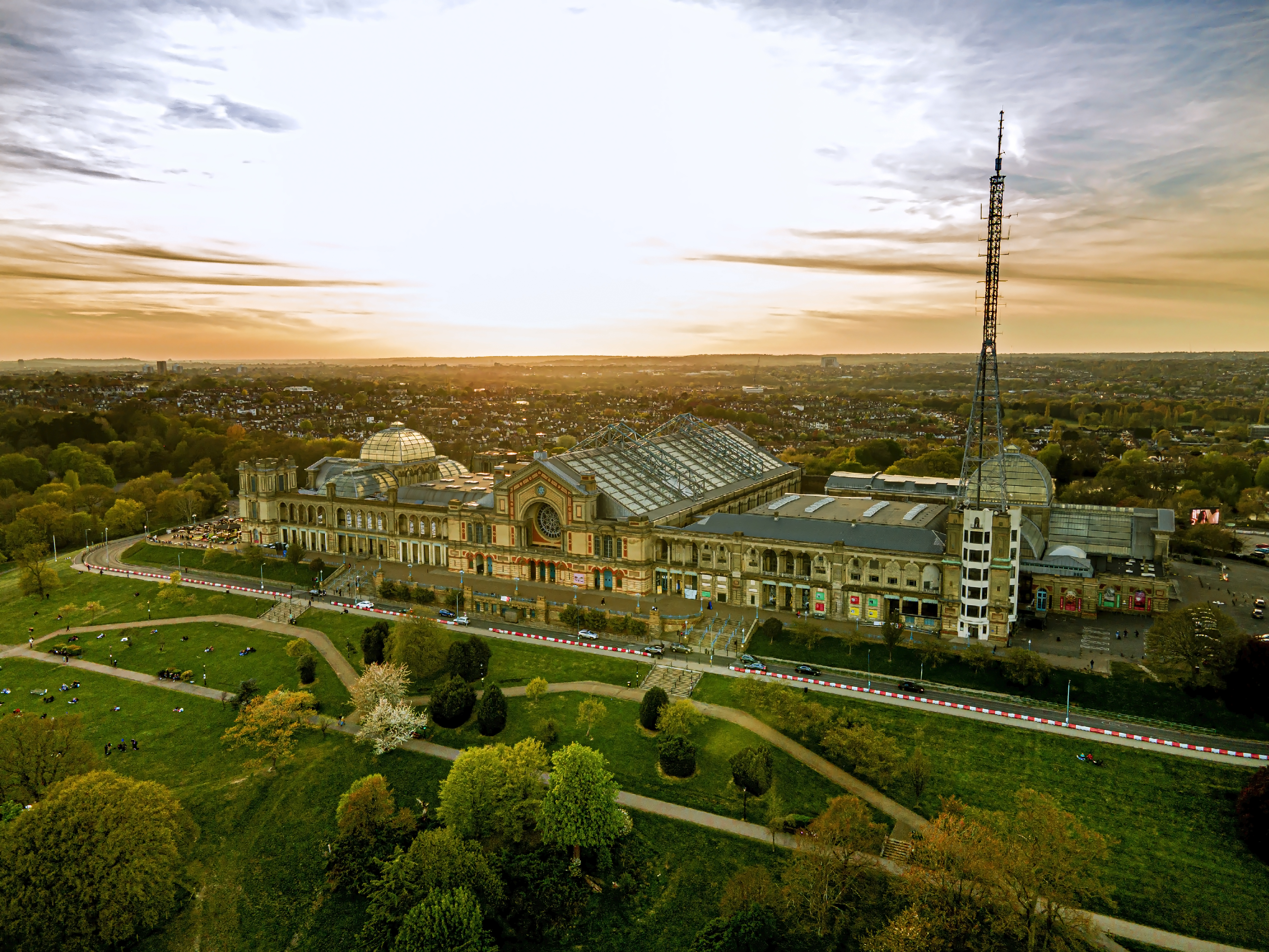
- Alexandra Palace (2021)
- Interactive map of Alexandra Palace
- Location: Alexandra Park, London, N22
- Coordinates: 51°35′39″N 00°07′51″W
- Operator: Alexandra Park and Palace Charitable Trust
- Capacity: 800 (Panorama Room); 1,750 (East Hall/Ice Rink); 2,000 (Palm Court); 2,500 (West Hall); 10,250 (Great Hall); 900 (seated)/1,300 (seated/standing) (Theatre)
- Public transit: Alexandra Palace; Wood Green

Construction
- Groundbreaking: September 1865
- Opened: 1 May 1875
- Renovated: 1873–75, 1980–88, 2016–17
- Cost: £417,000 (£45.3 million in 2025 pounds)
- Architects: Owen Jones, John Johnson and Alfred Meeson
- Builder: Kelk and Lucas

Website
- alexandrapalace.com
- Building details

General information
- Inaugurated: 24 May 1873

Alexandra Palace is an entertainment and sports venue in north London, situated between Wood Green and Muswell Hill in the London Borough of Haringey. A Grade II listed building, it is built on the site of Tottenham Wood and the later Tottenham Wood Farm. It was designed by John Johnson and Alfred Meeson. It opened in 1873 but following a fire two weeks after its opening, was rebuilt by Johnson. It was intended as "the People's Palace" and it is often referred to by the nickname "Ally Pally".

At first a private venture, in 1900 the owners planned to sell it and Alexandra Park for development. A group of neighbouring local authorities managed to acquire it. An Act of Parliament created the Alexandra Palace and Park Trust. The Act required the trustees to maintain the building and the park, and make them available for the free use and recreation of the public forever. The present trustee is the London Borough of Haringey, whose coat of arms shows lightning bolts depicting Alexandra Palace's pioneering role in the development of television.

In 1935 the trustees leased part of the Palace to the BBC for use as the production and transmission centre for their new television service. Thus, in 1936, it became the home of the world's first regular public (then) "high-definition" television service. The broadcasting system was 405-line monochrome analogue television – the first fully electronic television system to be used in regular broadcasting. Although other facilities soon superseded it after the Second World War, Alexandra Palace continued to be used by the BBC for many years, and its radio and television mast is still in use.

The original Studios A and B still survive in the southeast wing with their producers' galleries, and are used for exhibiting original historical television equipment. The original Victorian Alexandra Palace Theatre with its stage machinery also survives and, as of 2019, is back in use. The theatre and the stage structure are on English Heritage's Buildings at Risk register. Alexandra Palace became a listed building in 1996, at the instigation of the Hornsey Historical Society. A planned commercial development of the building into a mixed leisure complex, including a hotel, a replacement ice-skating rink, a cinema, a ten-pin bowling alley and an exhibition centre, encountered opposition from public groups and was blocked by the High Court in 2007.

The Great Hall and the West Hall are typically used for exhibitions, concerts and conferences. They are operated by the trading arm of the charitable trust that owns the building and the park on behalf of the public. There is also a pub, an ice rink, a palm court and a panoramic view of London.

In 2013 Alexandra Park was declared a local nature reserve. It is also a Site of Borough Importance for Nature Conservation, Grade 1.

The nearest railway stations are Alexandra Palace, with Great Northern services from Moorgate, and the London Underground station Wood Green on the Piccadilly line. Alexandra Palace is also served by London Buses route W3, which is operated by Arriva London.

== History ==
=== 19th century ===
The "Palace of the People" was conceived by Owen Jones in 1859. The Great Northern Palace Company, established by 1860, initially failed to raise financing for the construction of the Palace. Construction materials were acquired and recycled from the large 1862 International Exhibition building in South Kensington after it was demolished (the government had declined to take it over). In 1863 Alexandra Park Co. Ltd. acquired the land of Tottenham Wood Farm for conversion to a park and to build the People's Palace on a site on a ridge more than 300 ft (91 m) high, part of Muswell Hill. Alexandra Park opened to the public on 23 July 1863.

The planned building was originally named "The Palace of the People"; it and its park were renamed to honour the popular new Princess of Wales, Alexandra of Denmark, who had married Prince Albert Edward (the future King Edward VII) on 10 March 1863. "The Palace of the People" and "The People's Palace" remained as alternative names. In September 1865, construction commenced, but to a design by John Johnson and Alfred Meeson rather than implementing the glass structure initially proposed by Jones.

In 1871 work started on the Edgware, Highgate and London Railway to connect the site to Highgate station. Work on both the railway and the Palace finished in 1873 and, on 24 May of that year, Alexandra Palace and Park opened. The structure covers some 7.5 acres (3.0 ha). The Palace was built by Kelk and Lucas, who also built the Royal Albert Hall in South Kensington at around the same time. Sims Reeves sang on the opening day before an audience of 102,000. Only 16 days later a fire destroyed Alexandra Palace and also killed three members of staff. Only the outer walls survived; a loan exhibition of a collection of English pottery and porcelain, comprising some 4,700 items of historic and intrinsic value, was also destroyed.

The Palace, quickly rebuilt, reopened on 1 May 1875. The new Alexandra Palace contained a concert hall, art galleries, a museum, a lecture hall, a library, a banqueting room and a large theatre. The stage of the theatre incorporated machinery that enabled special-effects for the then-popular pantomimes and melodramas: performers could disappear, reappear and be propelled into the air. The theatre was also used for political meetings. An open-air swimming pool was constructed at the base of the hill in the surrounding park; it is long since closed and little trace of it remains apart from some reeds.

The grounds included a horse-racing course with a grandstand, named the Alexandra Park Racecourse but nicknamed the "Frying Pan" or the "Pan Handle" because of its layout. It was London's only racecourse from 1868 until its closure in 1970. There were also a Japanese village, a switchback ride, a boating lake and a nine-hole pitch-and-putt golf course. Alexandra Park cricket and football clubs have also played within the grounds (in the middle of the old racecourse) since 1888. A Henry Willis organ was installed in 1875, vandalised in 1918, and restored and reopened in 1929. In its restored form Willis's masterpiece was declared by Marcel Dupré to be the finest concert-organ in Europe.

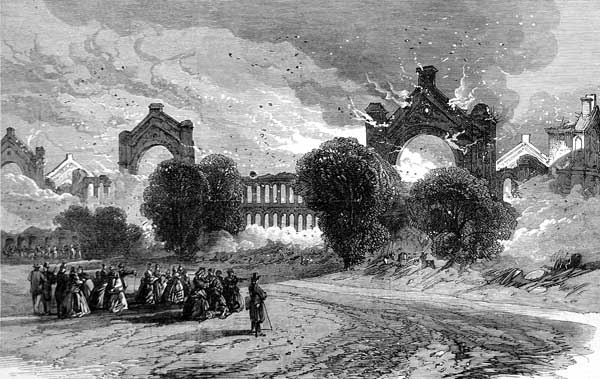
Original Alexandra Palace on fire in 1873

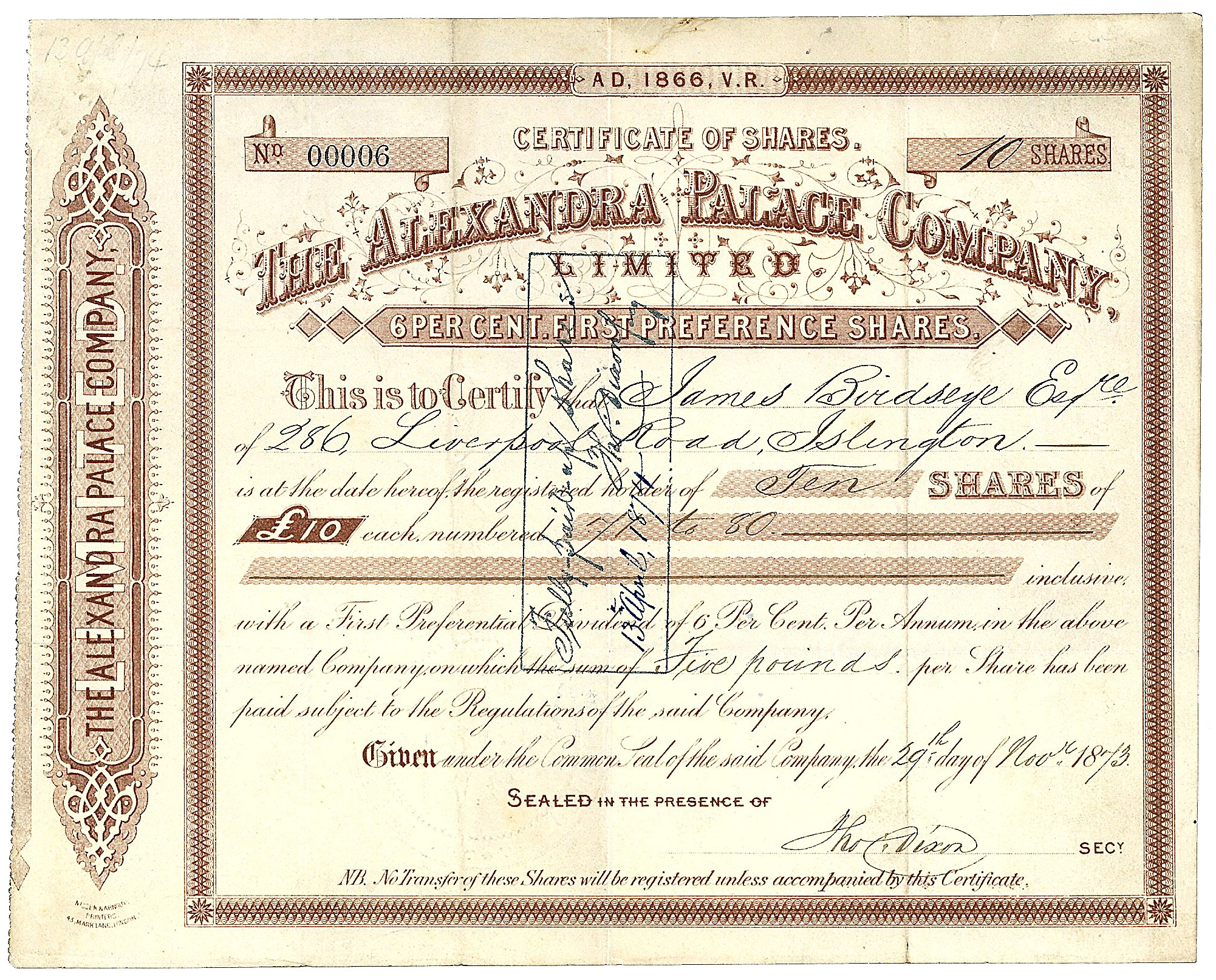
Founder's stock certificate of the Alexandra Palace Company for 10 preference shares of £10 each, issued 29 November 1873

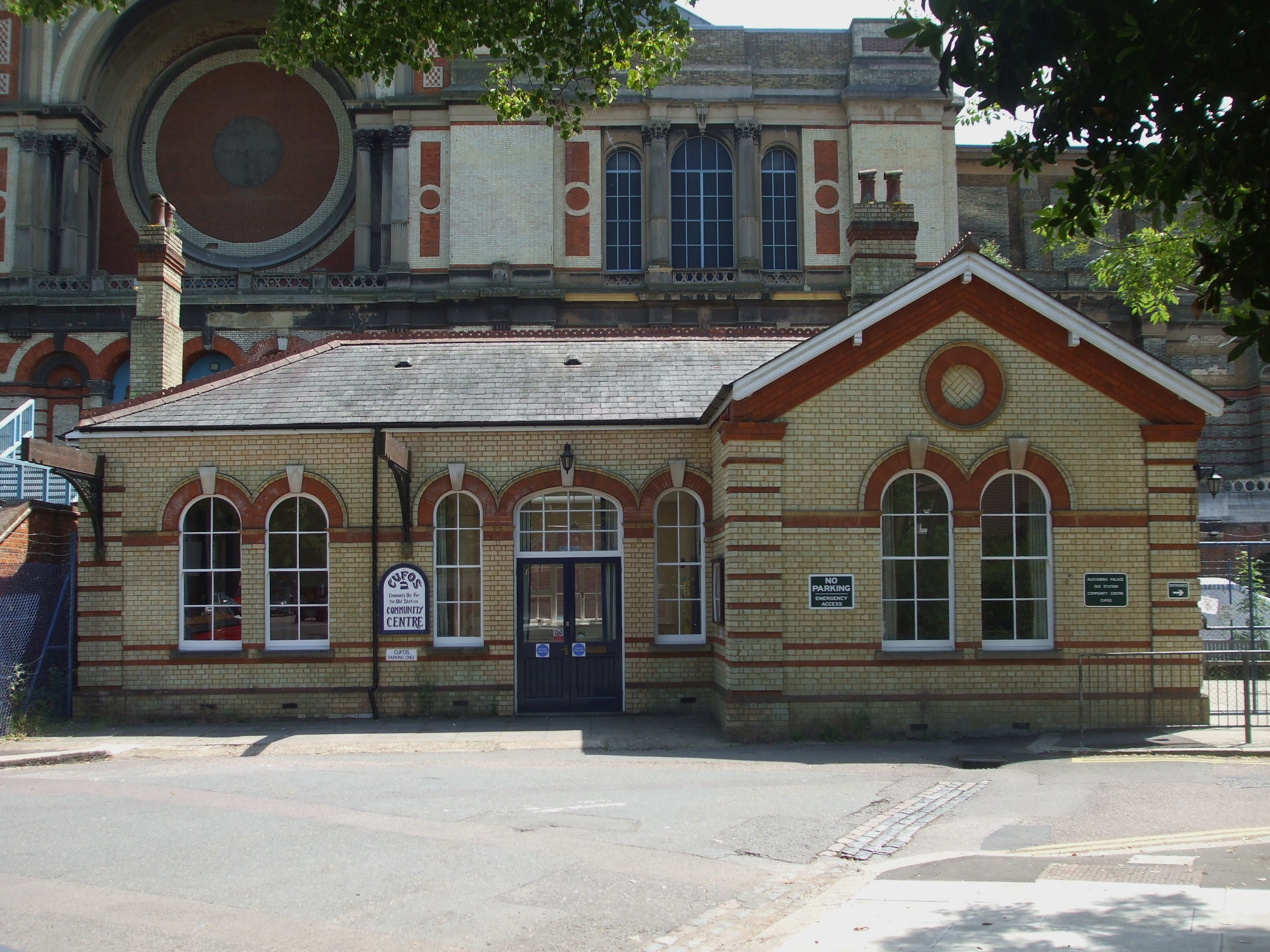
Former Alexandra Palace railway station (Muswell Hill branch)

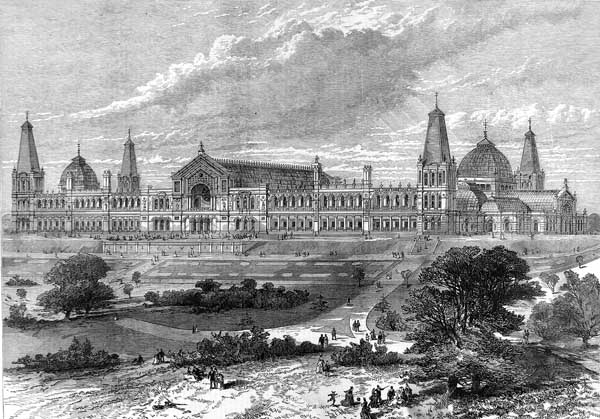
Rebuilt Palace in 1875

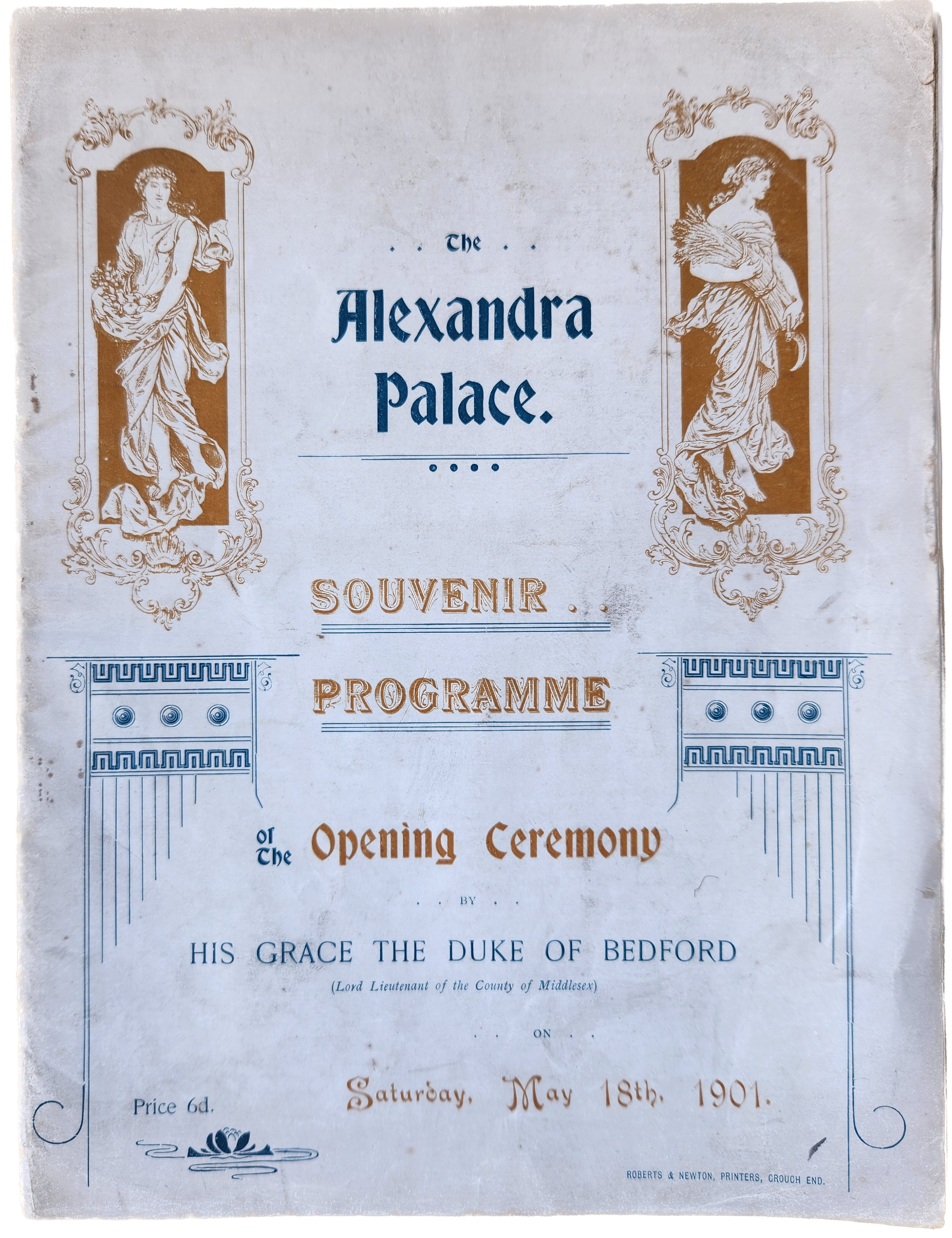
Alexandra Palace Souvenir Programme of the Opening Ceremony

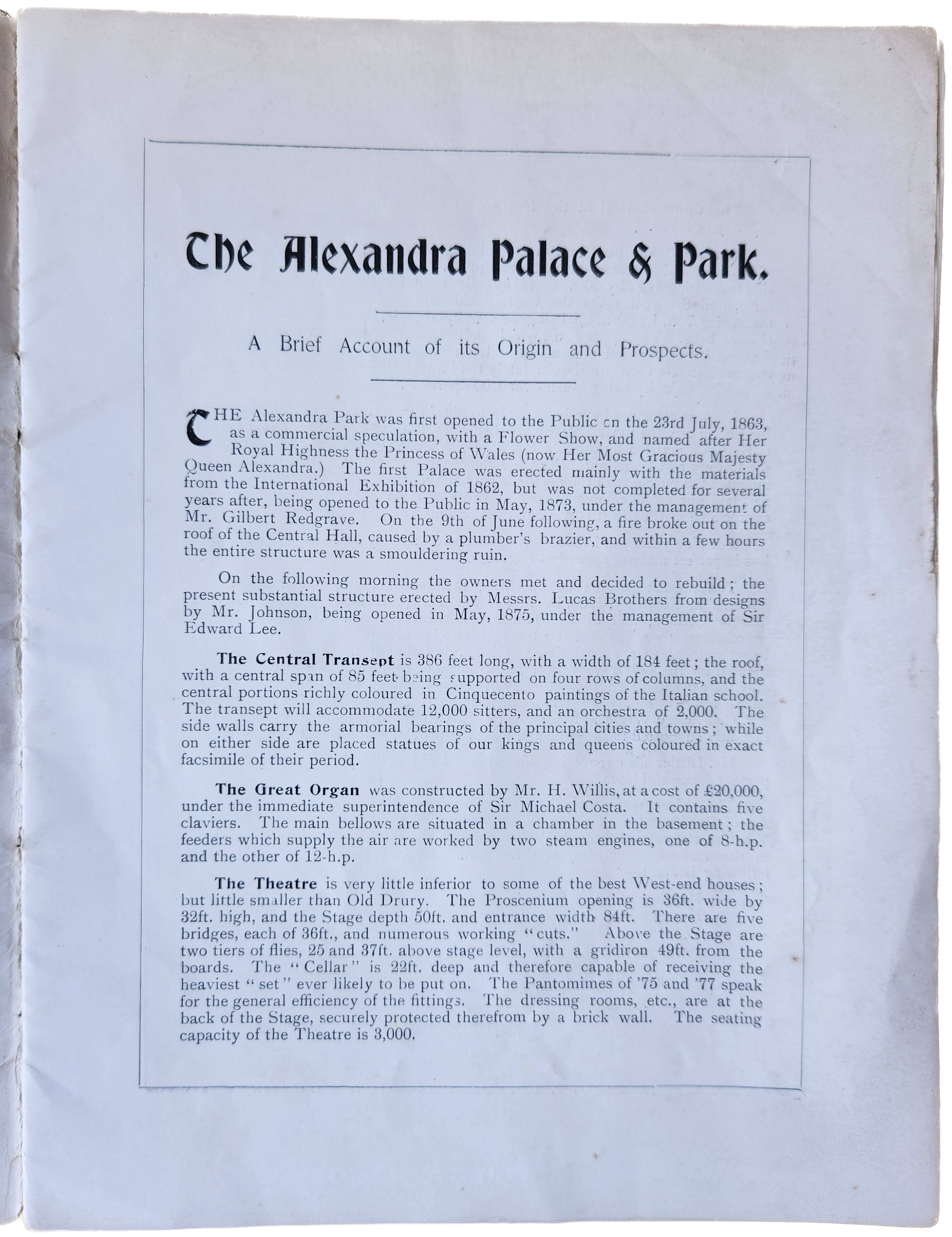
Alexandra Palace Souvenir Programme of the Opening Ceremony, p3

=== 20th century ===
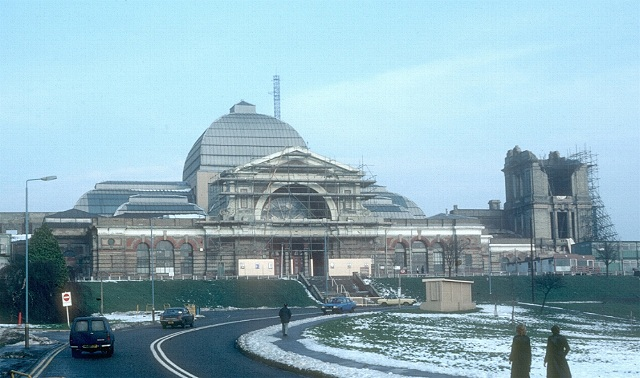
Reconstruction in January 1982, after a fire in 1980 destroyed much of the building

Alexandra Park and Palace (Public Purposes) Act 1900
- Act of Parliament
- Parliament of the United Kingdom
- Long title: An Act to constitute a body of Trustees for the purpose of acquiring the Alexandra Park Palace and other lands in the county of Middlesex and to empower them to hold and manage the same as a place of public resort and recreation and for other public purposes and to make all provisions necessary or proper in that behalf.
- Citation: 63 & 64 Vict. c. cclix

Dates
- Royal assent: 6 August 1900

In 1900 the owners of Alexandra Palace and Park were threatening to sell them for redevelopment, but a consortium headed by Henry Burt JP, a member of the Middlesex County Council and of Hornsey District Council, embraced the opportunity of securing the Palace and the grounds for the people of London. A committee was formed by Burt and the consortium managed to raise enough money to purchase them just in time. By the Alexandra Park and Palace (Public Purposes) Act 1900 (63 & 64 Vict. c. cclix), a charitable trust was created; representatives of the purchasing local authorities became the trustees with the duty to keep both building and park "available for the free use and recreation of the public forever".

In 1921 a plaque was erected at the entrance of the south terrace in honour of Burt. The Palace passed into the hands of the Greater London Council in 1967, with the proviso that it should be used entirely for charitable purpose. The trusteeship was transferred to Haringey council in 1980.

During the First World War the park was closed; the Palace and its grounds were first used as a refugee camp for displaced Belgians, and then later from 1915 to 1919 as an internment camp for German and Austrian civilians. The camp commandant was Lt. Col. R. S. F. Walker until his death in May 1917.

The theatre was greatly altered in the early 1920s, when the general manager, W. J. MacQueen-Pope, spent war reparation money on refurbishing the auditorium. He abandoned the understage machinery that had produced the effects necessary in Victorian melodrama; some of the machinery is preserved, and there is a project to restore some of it to working order. After these changes the theatre was leased by Archie Pitt, then husband of Gracie Fields, who appeared in the theatre. Fields also drew an audience of 5,000 people to the hall for a charity event.

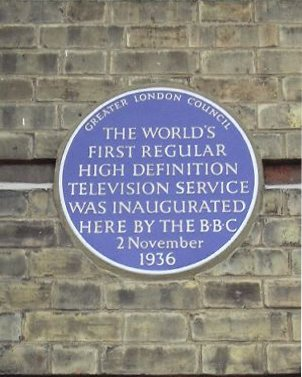
Blue plaque

In 1935 the trustees leased part of the Palace to the BBC for use as the production and transmission centre for their new BBC Television service. The antenna was designed by Charles Samuel Franklin of the Marconi Company. The world's first public broadcasts of (then) "high-definition" television were made from Alexandra Palace in November 1936, an event which is alluded to by the rays in the modern coat of arms of the London Borough of Haringey. Two competing systems, Marconi-EMI's 405-line system and John Logie Baird's 240-line system, were installed, each with its own broadcast studio and were transmitted on alternate weeks until the 405-line system was chosen in January 1937. After the BBC leased the eastern part of the Palace the theatre was only used for props storage space.

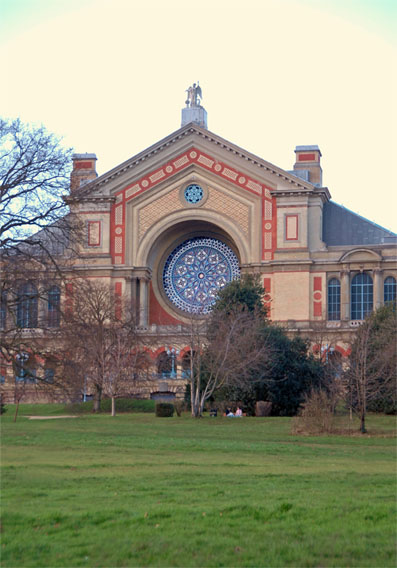
The Rose Window (southeast front)

The Palace continued as the BBC's main transmitting centre for London until 1956, interrupted only by the Second World War, when the transmitter found an alternative use jamming German bombers' navigation systems. In 1944, a German doodlebug exploded just outside the organ end of the Great Hall and the Rose Window was blown in, leaving the organ exposed to the elements. In 1947 some of the pieces of the shattered rose window were incorporated in a new design by architect E. T. Spashett during renovation of bomb-damaged public buildings by the Ministry of Works. During the 1940s and 1950s the Palace also housed a public roller-skating rink and the Alexandra Palace Roller Skating Club.

In the early 1960s an outside broadcast was made from the top of the tower, in which the first passage of a satellite across the London sky was watched and described. It continued to be used for BBC News broadcasts until 1969, and for the Open University until 1981. The antenna mast still stands and is used for local terrestrial television transmission, local commercial radio and Digital Audio Broadcasting. The main London television transmitter is now at Crystal Palace in South London.

In 1977 the Greater London Council (GLC) considered a £20 million proposal to redevelop Alexandra Park into a multi-sport complex constructed around a shared football ground for two North London clubs, Arsenal and Tottenham Hotspur. The 75,000-seat stadium would have required a new transit connection, either a monorail line or a branch of the Piccadilly line, and private funding. The proposal was rejected by the GLC after local opposition cited the potential for hooliganism in the area.

Early in 1980 Haringey Council took over the trusteeship of Alexandra Palace from the GLC, insuring it for £31 million, intending to refurbish the building but just six months later, during Capital Radio's Jazz Festival, a fire started under the organ and quickly spread. It destroyed half the building. Again the outer walls survived and the eastern parts, including the theatre and the BBC Television studios and aerial mast, were saved. Parts of the famous organ were destroyed, though it had been dismantled for repairs so some parts, including nearly all the pipework, were away from the building in store. Some of the damage to the Palace was repaired immediately, but Haringey Council overspent on the restoration, creating a £30 million deficit. The Palace was reopened to the public in 1988 under a new management team headed by Louis Bizat. Later the council was heavily criticised for the overspend in a report by Project Management International. In 1991 the Attorney General stated that the overspending by the council as trustee was unlawful, and so could not be charged to the charity. The council for some years did not accept this finding and instead maintained that the charity "owed" the council £30 million, charged compound interest on what it termed a "debt", which eventually rose to a claim of some £60 million, and to recoup it tried to offer the whole palace for sale.

An ice rink was installed at Alexandra Palace in 1990. Primarily intended for public skating, it has also housed ice hockey teams including the Harringay Racers, the Haringey Greyhounds, the London Racers and now the Haringey Huskies, as well as a figure skating club, the Alexandra Palace Amateur Ice Skating Club.

=== 21st century ===
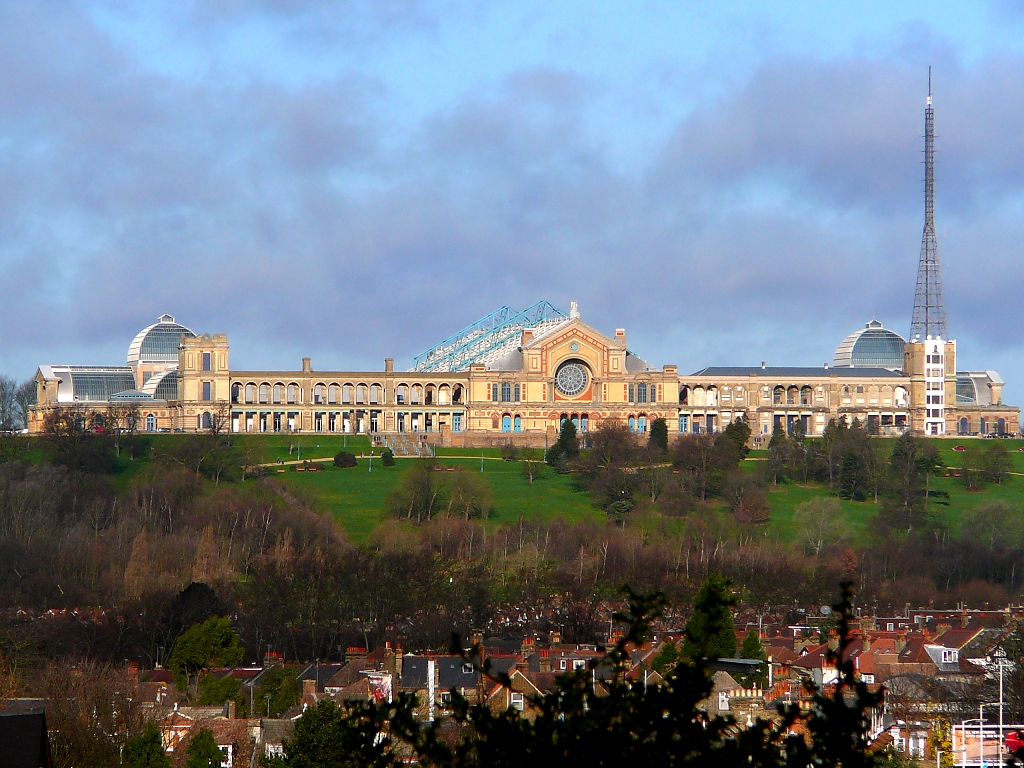
Viewed from the south in 2007

The first performances for about 70 years took place in the theatre, first in its foyer in June 2004, then, in July, in the theatre itself. Although conditions were far from ideal, the audience was able to see the potential of this very large space. Originally seating 3,000, it could not be licensed for more than a couple of hundred. It was intended that the theatre would reopen, but costly restoration would be required first. It will never again reach a seating capacity of 3,000, not least because one balcony was removed in the early part of the 20th century as a fire precaution when films started to be shown there. A major season of the theatre company Complicité was planned for 2005, but the project, which would have included some repair and access work, was cancelled due to higher-than-anticipated costs.

Plans by the current trustees, Haringey Council, to replace all the charitable uses by commercial ones through a lease of the entire building, including a casino, encountered considerable public and legal opposition, and on 5 October 2007, in the High Court, Mr Justice Sullivan granted an application by Jacob O'Callaghan, a London resident, to quash the Charity Commission's order authorising a 125-year lease of the entire building to Firoka Ltd.

In September 2009 the main hall at Alexandra Palace was allowed 2,000 more occupation, up to 10,250 ("still saddled by a £37 million debt it owes its guardian, Haringey Council").

A masterplan for the future of the site was drawn up in 2012, comprising six "big ideas" to restore and redevelop the Palace. The first of these to be implemented aimed to transform the derelict eastern end of the Palace, making the Victorian theatre and the historic BBC Studios accessible. In 2013 the Heritage Lottery Fund awarded a Round 1 pass to develop the proposals, creating a new entrance in the restored East Court, re-establishing the theatre as a flexible performance space and reopening the BBC Studios as a visitor attraction. There was controversy regarding plans to demolish the brick infills in the colonnade on the southeastern face of the building, which the BBC constructed after 1936 to form their television studios within. Following a public consultation and advice from English Heritage, Planning and Listed Building Consent was given for the proposals, and in March 2015 HLF awarded Round 2 major grant funding.

In 2018 Feilden Clegg Bradley Studios made a £27 million refurbishment of the long-abandoned Alexandra Palace Theatre and east wing.

In 2018 it was announced that the Theatre would open for a BBC Proms performance on 1 September before officially reopening to the public on 1 December 2018 following the completion of the East Wing Restoration Project by the contractor Willmott Dixon. The opening programme included performances from Dylan Moran, Horrible Histories, Gilbert & George, Gareth Malone and an evening of jazz presented by Ronnie Scott's.

During the coronavirus pandemic Alexandra Palace was used by Edible London as a food distribution hub for local residents.

== Notable events ==
=== Recurring ===
Alexandra Palace has hosted a number of significant events. Recurring events held there include the Great British Beer Festival (1977–1980), the Brit Awards (1993–1995), the PDC World Darts Championship (2008–present) and the Masters snooker tournament (2012–2020 and 2022–2025).

In November every year a large fireworks display is scheduled there as part of London's Bonfire Night celebrations.

=== 1960s ===
The Observer's Wildlife Exhibition held here in 1963 was an important early event in highlighting awareness of worldwide endangered species, and it gained a large attendance (46,000).

The News of the World Darts Championship final stage was held at Alexandra Palace from 1963 to 1977.

In April 1967 a benefit event took place at the Palace. The 14 Hour Technicolor Dream, organised by the International Times, demonstrated the importance of the quickly developing Underground scene. Although venues such as the UFO Club were hosting counter-cultural bands, this was certainly the largest indoor event at the time. Performers included headlining act Pink Floyd as well as the Pretty Things, Savoy Brown, the Crazy World of Arthur Brown, Soft Machine, The Purple Gang, The Move and Sam Gopal's Dream (featuring Sam Gopal, Mick Hutchinson and Pete Sears). John Lennon attended, and Yoko Ono (who was soon to become Lennon's new romantic partner) presented her performance work "Cut Piece".

=== 1970s ===
Audio description of Alexandra Palace by former local MP, Lynne Featherstone

In 1970 an Italian director, Lucio Fulci, filmed a segment of his giallo film A Lizard in a Woman's Skin here. Alexandra Palace posed as a disused church. The rock band Led Zeppelin played at Alexandra Palace's Grand Hall in two sell-out performances on the evenings of the 22/23 December 1972. Their concert tickets were priced at £1 each for the two-hour-long gig and were uniquely made available from specific Harlequin Record Shops within Central London.

In 1973 the Divine Light Mission held a "Festival of Love" there. Also in 1973, British rock band Wishbone Ash played a Christmas concert at the Palace, billed as "Christmas at the Palace".

The American band Grateful Dead played a series of three shows there between 9 and 11 September 1974; a recording of portions of all three shows was released as part of the Dick's Picks series in March 1997.

The Campaign for Real Ale held the Great British Beer Festival there from 1977 to 1980 (the 1980 edition taking place in tents outside the fire-damaged Alexandra Palace). On the afternoon of 10 July 1980 (an accidental) fire destroyed the Great Hall, Banqueting Suite, Dressing Rooms and Ice Rink during contractors routine repairs and maintenance.

From 27 July to 5 August 1973 The London Music Festival '73 was held here.

=== 1980s ===
After the fire, the burnt-out shell of the great hall of Alexandra Palace was used as Victory Square in Michael Radford's 1984 film adaptation of George Orwell's novel Nineteen Eighty-Four.

The Sinclair C5 battery electric vehicle was launched at the Palace in January 1985, one week after the closure of the 405-line television system that was inaugurated there 49 years earlier.

In November 1989 the Stone Roses performed a concert at Alexandra Palace.

=== 1990s ===
Hugh Cornwell played his last performance with the Stranglers at Alexandra Palace in August 1990. This was documented by the Saturday Night, Sunday Morning album and video.

Blur performed a major concert at the venue in October 1994 to promote their album Parklife. The recording of the concert was released on video in February 1995 with the title Showtime and used as the basis for the video for the band's song "End of a Century".

From 1993 to 1995 the Brit Awards were hosted at Alexandra Palace. In November 1996 it was the venue for the annual MTV Europe Music Awards.

In 1996 the Palace hosted the inaugural London Model Engineering Exhibition, which continued each year until 2021 when it was cancelled due to the COVID-19 pandemic.

=== 2000s ===
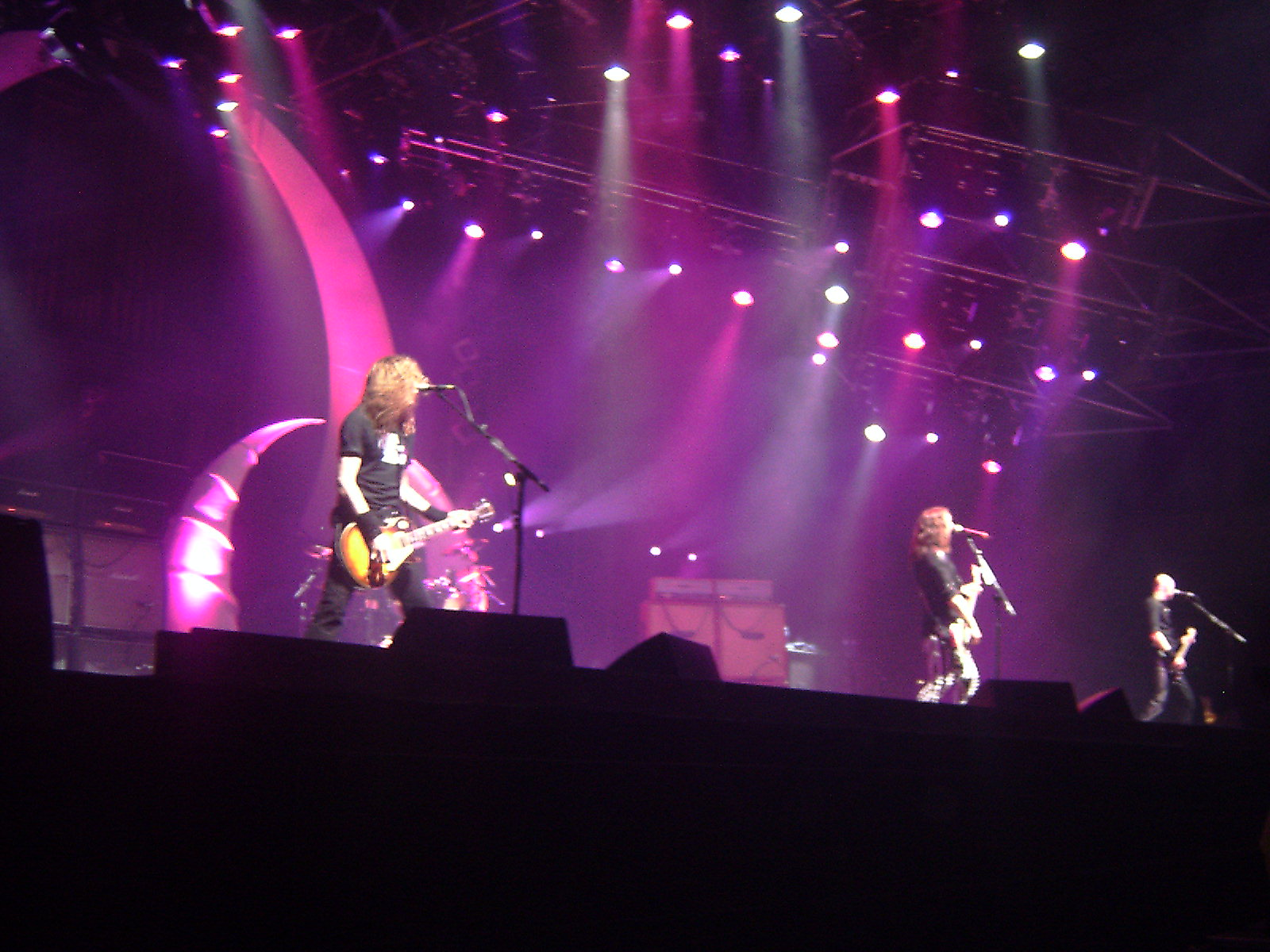
The Darkness performing at Alexandra Palace in 2006

In April 2000 the funeral service of the Labour MP Bernie Grant took place at the Palace. An estimated 3,000 people attended.

The fourth Mind Sports Olympiad was held at Alexandra Palace in August 2000, with more than 4,000 competitors from around the world taking part in mind sports.

In December 2002 the Miss World 2002 pageant was staged at the venue.

In June 2007 a Hackday event was hosted at Alexandra Palace by the BBC and Yahoo! During the event the building was struck by lightning, causing the fire vents to open (and then get stuck open), and it rained inside the building.

Since December 2007 Alexandra Palace has hosted the PDC World Darts Championship, following 14 years from December 1993 to January 2007 of the tournament being held at the Circus Tavern in Purfleet, Essex. The Palace was previously home to the News of the World Darts Championship between 1963 and 1977.

April 2008 saw the relaunch of the regular antiques fairs, now held four times a year, organised by International Antiques & Collectors Fairs (IACF).

=== 2010s ===
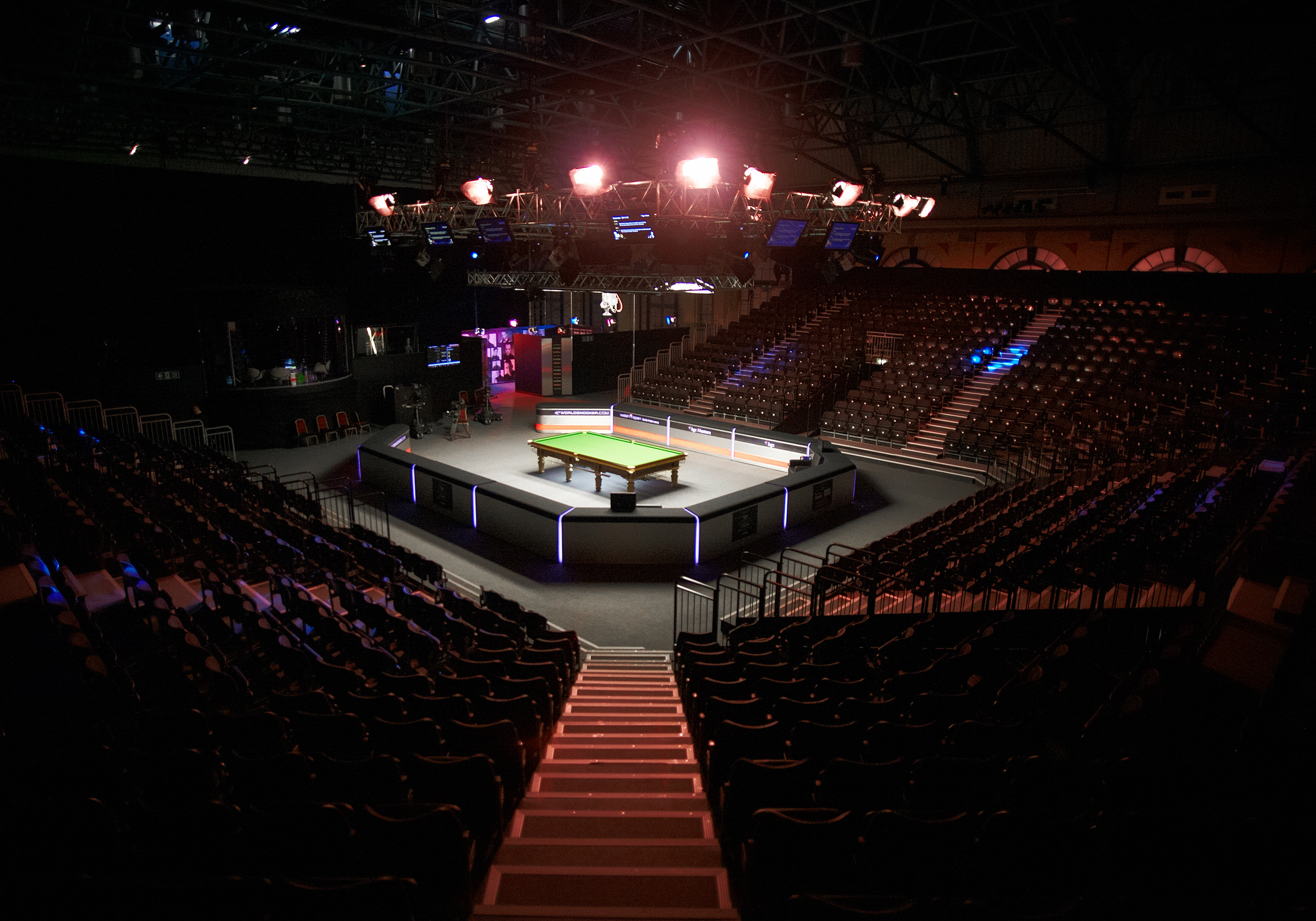
The Masters snooker tournament has been played at Alexandra Palace since 2012.

The band Portishead hosted one of two All Tomorrow's Parties festivals titled I'll Be Your Mirror in July 2011 at Alexandra Palace. The 50th anniversary programme of Songs of Praise was recorded there in September 2011 and broadcast the following month.

Since 2012 the Palace has been the venue for the Masters snooker tournament, held every January. The only subsequent year it has not been held there was 2021, as a result of the COVID-19 pandemic.

During the 2012 Summer Olympics the Palace served as the official hospitality venue for the Dutch Olympic team.

In November 2012 it was the venue for the annual Warped Tour, a music and extreme sports festival.

The band Suede appeared in March 2013, playing one of the first dates in support of Bloodsports, their first new album in more than a decade. In September 2013 Björk performed one of the final concerts of her Biophilia tour. The show was the last concert to be held "in the round", a format that characterised the tour, and the first to be performed in this way at Alexandra Palace. The eclectic programming has included in 2015, Florence and the Machine playing 4 dates of their How Big, How Blue, How Beautiful Tour in the Palace as well as in 2016 alone, heavy metal band Slipknot, Drum & Bass DJ Andy C and the Last Shadow Puppets; with sell out shows by Twenty One Pilots and Panic at the Disco.

The bootcamp stage for series 13 of The X Factor was filmed at the Alexandra Palace from 6 to 8 July 2016.

=== 2020s ===
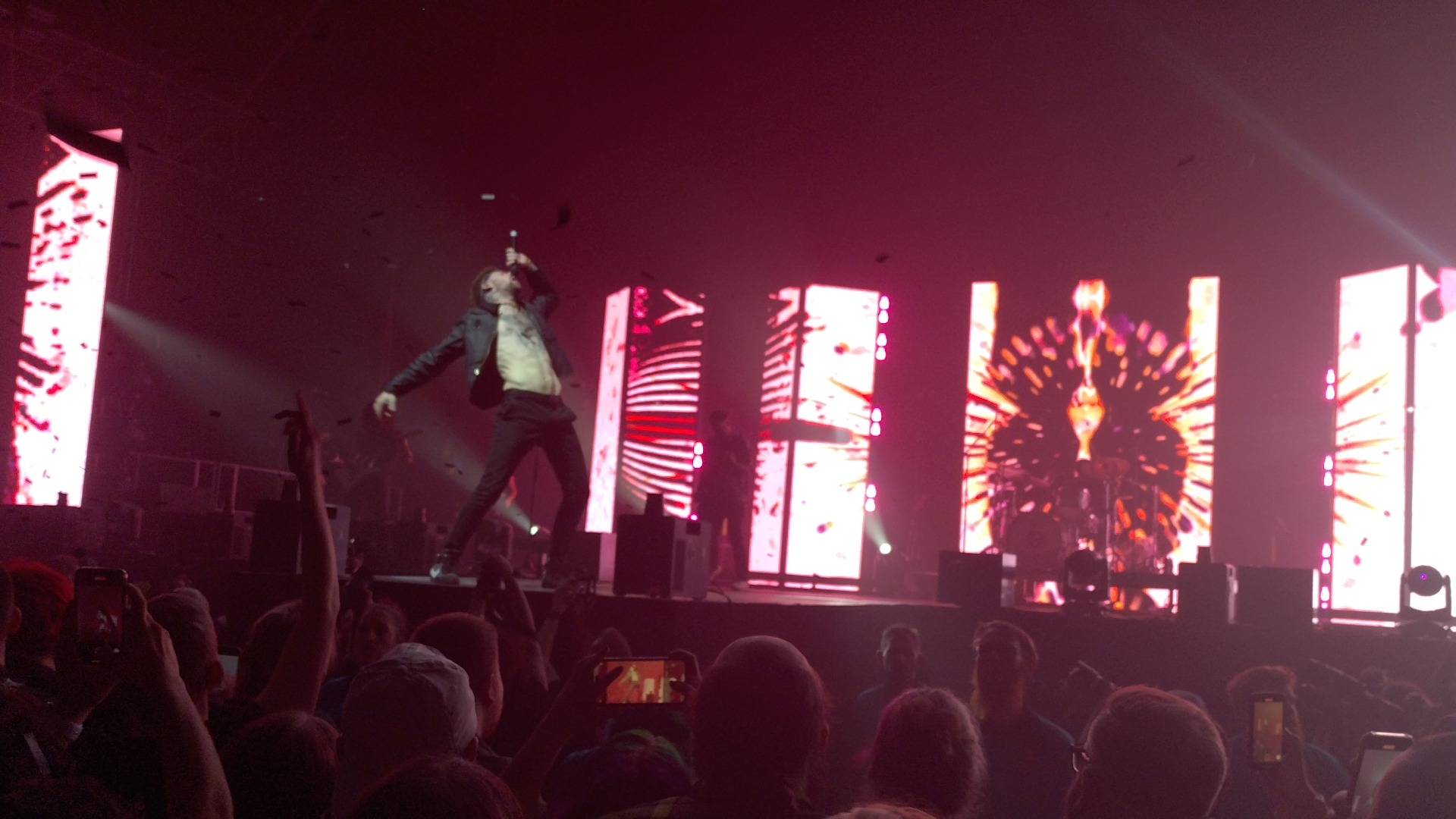
Beartooth performing at Alexandra Palace in October 2024

In June 2020, Nick Cave recorded the live album and concert film Idiot Prayer in the West Hall. On the record, he performs songs from throughout his career solo on the piano.

On 18 April 2021 London Grammar performed their third album, Californian Soil, live at Alexandra Palace.

The Duke and Duchess of Cambridge presented the inaugural Earthshot Prizes, with many celebrity guests, at Alexandra Palace on 17 October 2021.

Fontaines D.C. performed the last show of their 2021 UK tour at Alexandra Palace on 27 October 2021.

On 11 November 2021 Bethesda Softworks hosted a special concert to celebrate the 10th anniversary release of The Elder Scrolls V: Skyrim. The performance by the London Symphony Orchestra and London Voices was livestreamed during the COVID-19 pandemic.

Boxxer Promotions used the Palace for a Sunday special card which was headlined by rising prospect Adam Azim. The event took place on 27 November 2022 and aired live on Sky Sports.

== Notes and references ==
Preceded by Sun City Entertainment Centre (South Africa) Sun City	Miss World venue 2002	Succeeded by Crown of Beauty Theatre (China) Sanya
