= Tottenham Lane =

Street in north London

Coordinates: 51°35′1.38″N 0°6′59.51″W

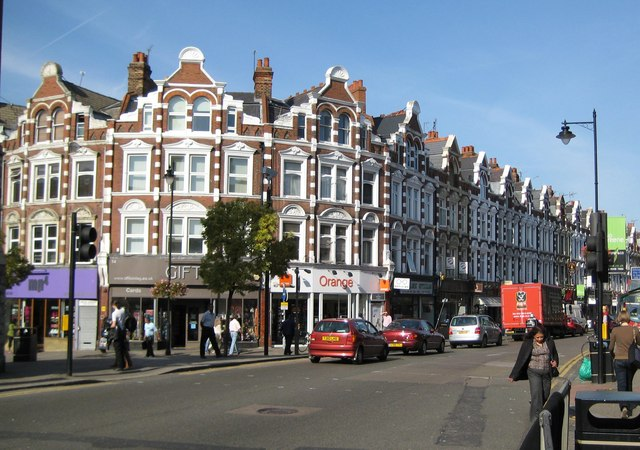
Topsfield Parade in the southern end of Tottenham Lane, looking north.

Tottenham Lane is a street in Crouch End and Hornsey in the London Borough of Haringey. The street runs from the centre of Crouch End at the clock tower, north to the junction of the High Street and Turnpike Lane (A504).

== Buildings ==
Tottenham Lane (bottom left to top right) on an 1890s Ordnance Survey map before the area was fully built up.

The street is notable for Broadway Parade (east) and Topsfield Parade (west) on either side of the street at the immediate southern end. Broadway Parade was built by the developer and architect John Cathles Hill. Topsfield Parade was built on the estate of Henry Weston Elder by James Edmondson of Highbury and replaced Topsfield Hall, a Georgian mansion that was sold in 1892. Edmonsons later built identical shopping parades in Muswell Hill.

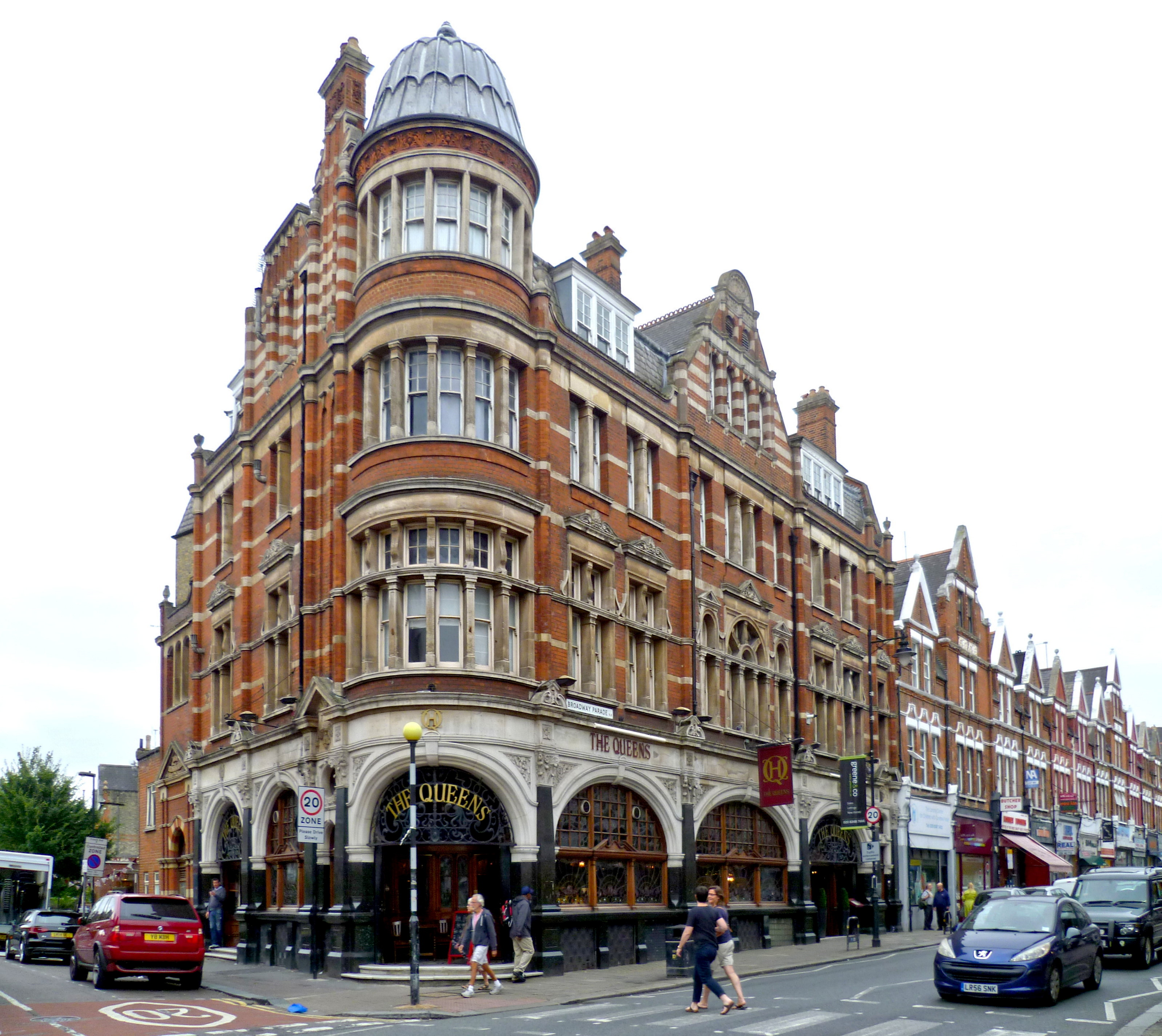
The Queens

At the southern end, on the corner with Elder Avenue, is The Queens, a grade II* listed public house described in Pevsner as "one of suburban London's outstanding grand pubs".

The ill-fated Crouch End Hippodrome, opened as the Queen's Opera House in 1897 in the middle of Topsfield Parade on the western side of Tottenham Lane. It was originally conceived as a space for public meetings and the like and was to be opened as the Crouch End Athenaeum, but commercial pressures led it being reimagined as an entertainment venue. It opened as an opera house and theatre but was transformed into a variety venue when it reopened in 1907 after a three-year closure following a bad fire.Later it was a cinema before being damaged by bombing during the Second World War and subsequently demolished apart from the front which still stands in Topsfield Parade.

The grade II listed Holy Innocents Church of England church is in the street.

Hornsey railway station is in the north of the street.
