= James Edmondson =

James Edmondson may refer to:

- James Edmondson (builder) (1857–1931), English property developer
- James Edmondson, 1st Baron Sandford (1887–1959), British politician
- J. Howard Edmondson (1925–1971), Governor of Oklahoma from 1959 to 1963
- James E. Edmondson (born 1945), Oklahoma Supreme Court Justice
- James Larry Edmondson (born 1947), U.S. federal judge
- James Edmondson (footballer) (born 2005), English footballer
