= Grade I and II* listed buildings in the London Borough of Haringey =

There are over 9,000 Grade I listed buildings and 20,000 Grade II* listed buildings in England. This page is a list of these buildings in the London Borough of Haringey.

== Grade I ==
Name	Location	Type	Completed (Note: The date given is the date used by Historic England as significant for the initial building or that of an important part in the structure's description.)	Date designated	Grid ref. (Note: The grid reference is based on the British national grid reference system, sometimes known as OSGB36, used by the Ordnance Survey.) Geo-coordinates	Entry number (Note: The "List Entry Number" is a unique number assigned to each listed building and scheduled monument by Historic England.)	Image
Bruce Castle	Tottenham, Haringey	House	c. 1600	22 July 1949	TQ3339690676; 51°35′57″N 0°04′31″W	1358861	Bruce Castle More images
Tower to South West of Bruce Castle	Tottenham, Haringey	Tower	16th century	22 July 1949	TQ3337990652; 51°35′56″N 0°04′32″W	1294388	Tower to South West of Bruce Castle More images
Cromwell House	Highgate, Haringey	House	1637–1638	19 March 1951	TQ2879787290; 51°34′11″N 0°08′35″W	1079233	Cromwell House More images
Forecourt Walls to Cromwell House	Highgate, Haringey	Gate Pier	Later	10 May 1974	TQ2879087282; 51°34′11″N 0°08′35″W	1188817	Forecourt Walls to Cromwell House More images
Highpoint I (A–D, G–I, K, 1–12, 12A, and 14– 48)	Highgate, Haringey	Flats	1933–1935	10 May 1974	TQ2825287841; 51°34′29″N 0°09′02″W	1358885	Highpoint I (A–D, G–I, K, 1–12, 12A, and 14– 48) More images
Highpoint II	Highgate, Haringey	Flats	1936–1938	10 May 1974	TQ2826987801; 51°34′28″N 0°09′02″W	1079183	Highpoint II More images

== Grade II* ==
Name	Location	Type	Completed	Date designated	Grid ref. Geo-coordinates	Entry number	Image
All Hallows Vicarage, the Priory	Tottenham, Haringey	House	1620	22 July 1949	TQ3330890796; 51°36′01″N 0°04′36″W	1079263	All Hallows Vicarage, the Priory More images
Byron House	Highgate, Haringey	House	Early 18th century	19 March 1951	TQ2827187543; 51°34′20″N 0°09′02″W	1358887	Byron House More images
Church of St Bartholomew	Stamford Hill, Haringey	Parish Church	1904	10 May 1974	TQ3386688160; 51°34′35″N 0°04′11″W	1079264	Church of St Bartholomew More images
Church of St John the Baptist (greek Orthodox)	Harringay, Haringey	Parish Church	1896–1898	10 May 1974	TQ3119889208; 51°35′11″N 0°06′28″W	1189472	Church of St John the Baptist (greek Orthodox) More images
Dial House	Tottenham, Haringey	House	Late 17th century	22 July 1949	TQ3390091350; 51°36′18″N 0°04′04″W	1079241	Dial House
Forecourt Walls and Railings to Number 796 (Percy House)	Tottenham, Haringey	Gate	LATE 17th century OR EARLY 18th century	22 July 1949	TQ3389291382; 51°36′19″N 0°04′05″W	1079243	Forecourt Walls and Railings to Number 796 (Percy House)
Front Wall and Gates to the Priory	Tottenham, Haringey	Gate	Early 18th century	10 May 1974	TQ3333390788; 51°36′01″N 0°04′35″W	1358844	Front Wall and Gates to the Priory More images
Hornsey Town Hall	Crouch End, Haringey	Town Hall	1935	16 January 1981	TQ3020488316; 51°34′43″N 0°07′20″W	1263688	Hornsey Town Hall More images
Ireton House	Highgate, Haringey	House	18th century	19 March 1951	TQ2878487300; 51°34′12″N 0°08′36″W	1079235	Ireton House More images
Ivy House and Northgate House	Highgate, Haringey	House	Post-1664	19 March 1951	TQ2863987356; 51°34′13″N 0°08′43″W	1358831	Ivy House and Northgate House More images
Odeon Cinema	Muswell Hill, Haringey	Cinema	1935–1936	6 March 1984	TQ2850889490; 51°35′23″N 0°08′47″W	1079178	Odeon Cinema More images
Parish Church of All Hallows	Tottenham, Haringey	Parish Church	14th century	22 July 1949	TQ3331590854; 51°36′03″N 0°04′35″W	1188633	Parish Church of All Hallows More images
Parish Church of St Ann	St Ann's, Haringey	Parish Church	1861	10 May 1974	TQ3282488674; 51°34′53″N 0°05′04″W	1358852	Parish Church of St Ann More images
Percy House	Tottenham, Haringey	House	Mid 18th century	22 July 1949	TQ3390491385; 51°36′19″N 0°04′04″W	1079242	Percy House
The Queens Public House	Crouch End, Haringey	Hotel	1899–1901	23 November 1973	TQ3022888571; 51°34′51″N 0°07′19″W	1079170	The Queens Public House More images
The Salisbury Public House	Harringay, Haringey	Restaurant	1898–1899	10 May 1974	TQ3178888753; 51°34′56″N 0°05′58″W	1358865	The Salisbury Public House More images
The Sycamores	17-21 North Road, Highgate, Haringey	House	Early 18th century	19 March 1951	TQ2828387560; 51°34′20″N 0°09′01″W	1079194	The Sycamores More images
Top Rank Club (former Gaumont Cinema)	Wood Green, Haringey	Bingo Hall	1933–34	26 March 1990	TQ3100090285; 51°35′46″N 0°06′36″W	1263635	Top Rank Club (former Gaumont Cinema)
Tower of Old Parish Church of St Mary	Hornsey, Haringey	Tower	15th century	19 March 1951	TQ3063189290; 51°35′14″N 0°06′57″W	1189047	Tower of Old Parish Church of St Mary More images
No. 583 and 585 High Road	Tottenham, Haringey	House	Early to mid-18th century	22 July 1949	TQ3384590376; 51°35′47″N 0°04′09″W	1358855	No. 583 and 585 High Road
No. 808 and 810 High Road	Tottenham, Haringey	House	Early 18th century	22 July 1949	TQ3390291452; 51°36′22″N 0°04′04″W	1358835	No. 808 and 810 High Road
