= The Queens, Crouch End =

Listed pub in London, England

The Queens
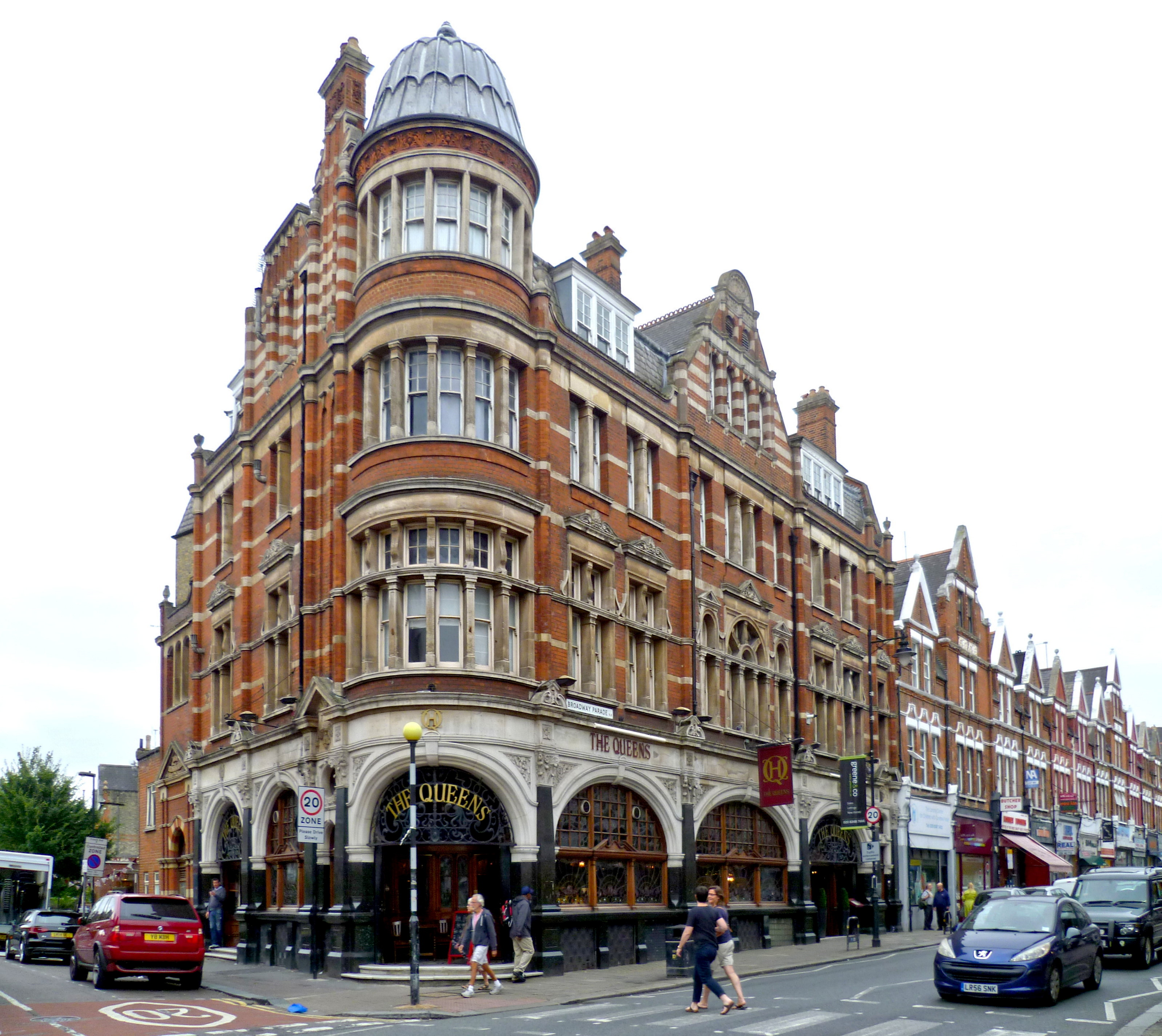
- The pub in 2016

- Location within London Borough of Haringey Location within Greater London
- Former names: The Queen's Hotel

General information
- Type: Public house with flats above; originally a hotel
- Location: 26 Broadway Parade, Crouch End, London, England
- Coordinates: 51.580513°N 0.122470°W
- Year built: 1899–1901; 125 years ago
- Renovated: 2001 (altered)
- Owner: Abbey Road Consultants LLP

Design and construction
- Architect: John Cathles Hill
- Other designers: Cakebread Robey (stained glass)
- Designations

Listed Building – Grade II
- Official name: The Queens public house
- Designated: 23 November 1973
- Reference no.: 1079170

Website
- Official website

The Queens is a Grade II* listed public house and former hotel on the corner of Broadway Parade and Elder Avenue in Crouch End, London, England. Built as The Queen's Hotel between 1899 and 1901 according to its official listing, it was developed by John Cathles Hill and incorporates Art Nouveau-style stained glass by Cakebread Robey. It retains a largely intact historic interior which has been recognised by the Campaign for Real Ale (CAMRA) as being of "outstanding national historic importance" and awarded three stars on its National Inventory of Historic Pub Interiors.

== History ==
According to Pevsner, it was originally built as The Queen's Hotel by the architect and developer John C. Hill between 1898 and 1902, though its official listing states construction took place between 1899 and 1901, with Art Nouveau-style stained glass by Cakebread Robey. Built at the northern end of Hill's recently completed Broadway Parade, it is described in Pevsner as "one of suburban London's outstanding grand pubs". Diagonally opposite, on Topsfield Parade, was the Queen's Opera House, which was opened in 1897 but damaged by bombing during the Second World War and subsequently demolished.

On 23 November 1973, The Queens was designated a Grade II* listed building. The Campaign for Real Ale (CAMRA) regards it as having an interior of "outstanding national historic importance" and awards it a three-star rating on its National Inventory of Historic Pub Interiors. In 1985, a full screen dividing two of the public rooms was removed. Following local opposition, it was subsequently reinstated, although a doorway was added.

The saloon lounge originally included a seating area and later a stage used by Victorian and Edwardian performers. In 2001, the area was converted into an open kitchen following approval by English Heritage. As of November 2026, the freehold was owned by Abbey Road Consultants LLP and the pub was leased by Urban Pubs & Bars. The upper floors are in private residential use and contain twelve flats.

== Architecture ==
=== Exterior ===
The building has three storeys with an attic, occupying a prominent corner site. It has a three-bay frontage to Broadway Parade with an additional narrower bay at the southern end, and continues around a rounded corner onto Elder Avenue, where there are two main bays and a lower end bay. The exterior is built of red brick with pale stone detailing, while the ground floor incorporates black granite. The roof includes a slate mansard with dormer windows and a lead-covered corner turret.

The main entrance is through a circular lobby containing a mosaic floor with the initials "QH" and decorative ironwork bearing the name "The Queens". Along Broadway Parade, the ground floor is formed by a series of large arched windows with stained glass decoration. A second entrance on the south side is marked by classical columns, decorative ironwork and another mosaic floor displaying the hotel's name. A separate doorway at the southern end provides access to the upper floors.

The principal elevation is divided by pilasters and decorative stonework, with rows of windows framed by classical architectural detailing. The upper floors feature striped brickwork, while the central bay rises into a gable containing a group of attic windows. At the corner is a rounded turret with multi-light windows and an ornamental lead roof.

The Elder Avenue elevation steps upwards towards the corner and includes arcaded ground-floor openings with decorative screens. A former entrance to the upper floors, now blocked, survives beneath a pediment bearing the hotel's name.

=== Interior ===
The interior survives largely intact and is centred on a main bar divided into four separate areas by ornate timber screens with glazed panels, etched door decoration and Art Nouveau stained glass. Decorative openwork panels run above the screens. The four rooms retain half-height timber panelling, above which are friezes of embossed Lincrusta decorated with floral and geometric patterns. The bar itself retains a panelled counter, while the saloon bar includes a small snug, a fireplace with a tiled surround and a mirrored overmantel set within a recessed inglenook. A further timber fireplace with tiled decoration and a mirrored overmantel stands against the east wall. The saloon lounge contains alcoves, including one with a raised platform formerly used by Victorian and Edwardian performers.

Other notable features include a coffered ceiling decorated with relief designs incorporating flowing ornamental motifs and mermaids, together with cast-iron columns with Corinthian capitals at the centre of the room.

== In popular culture ==
The Queens was used as a filming location for the 2000 gangster film Love, Honour and Obey.

== Gallery ==
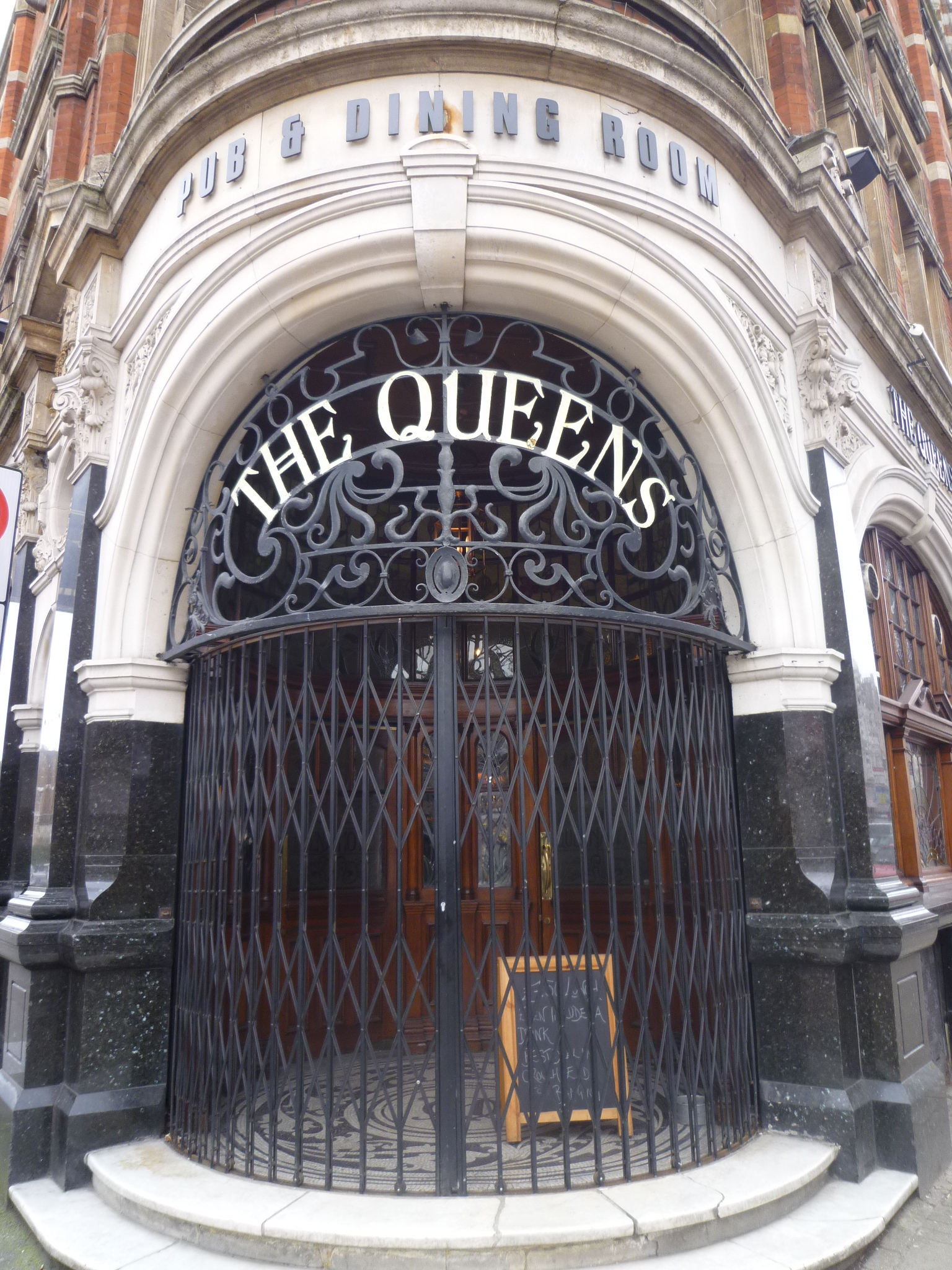
Main entrance

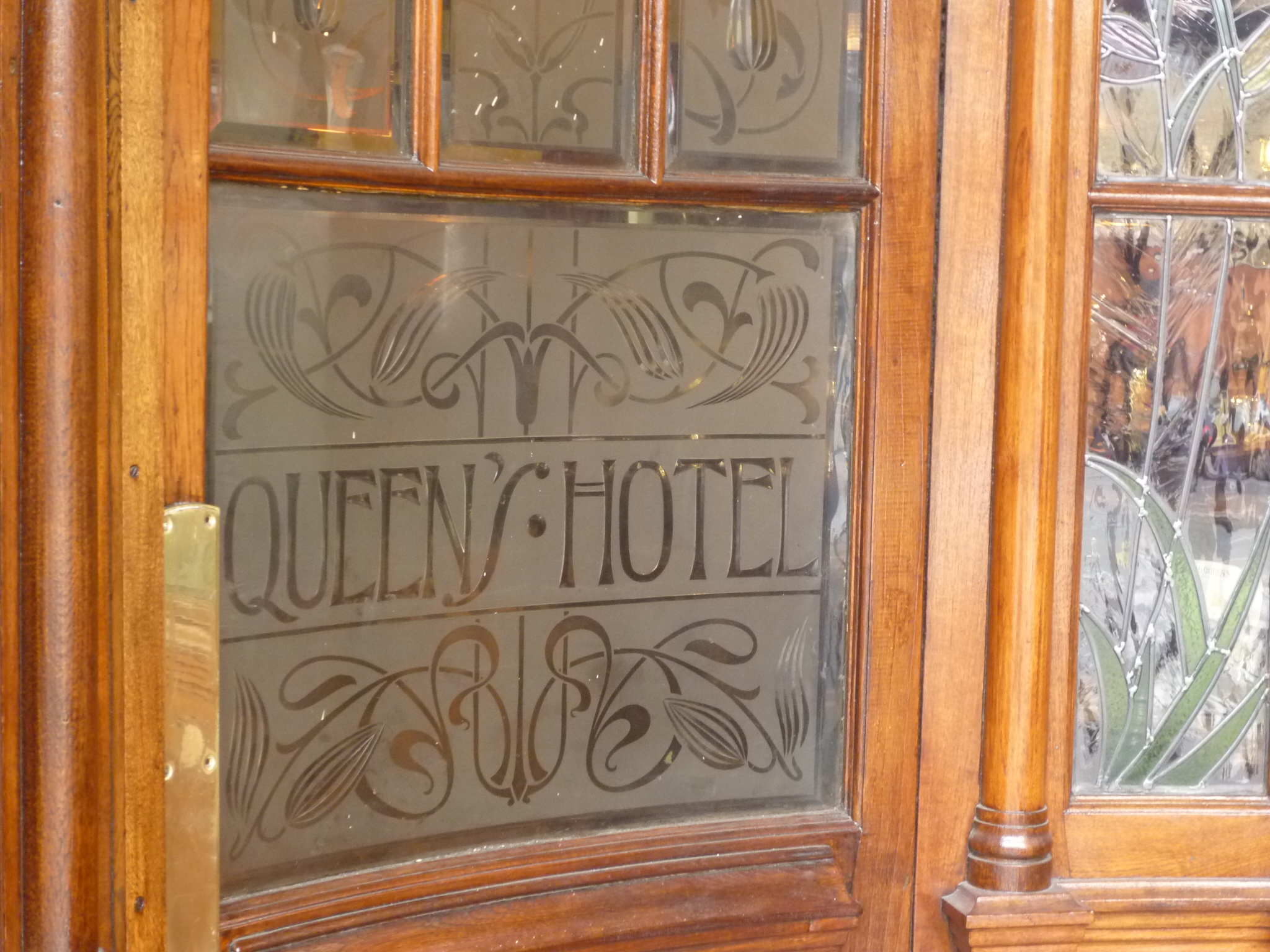
Queen's Hotel glass etching

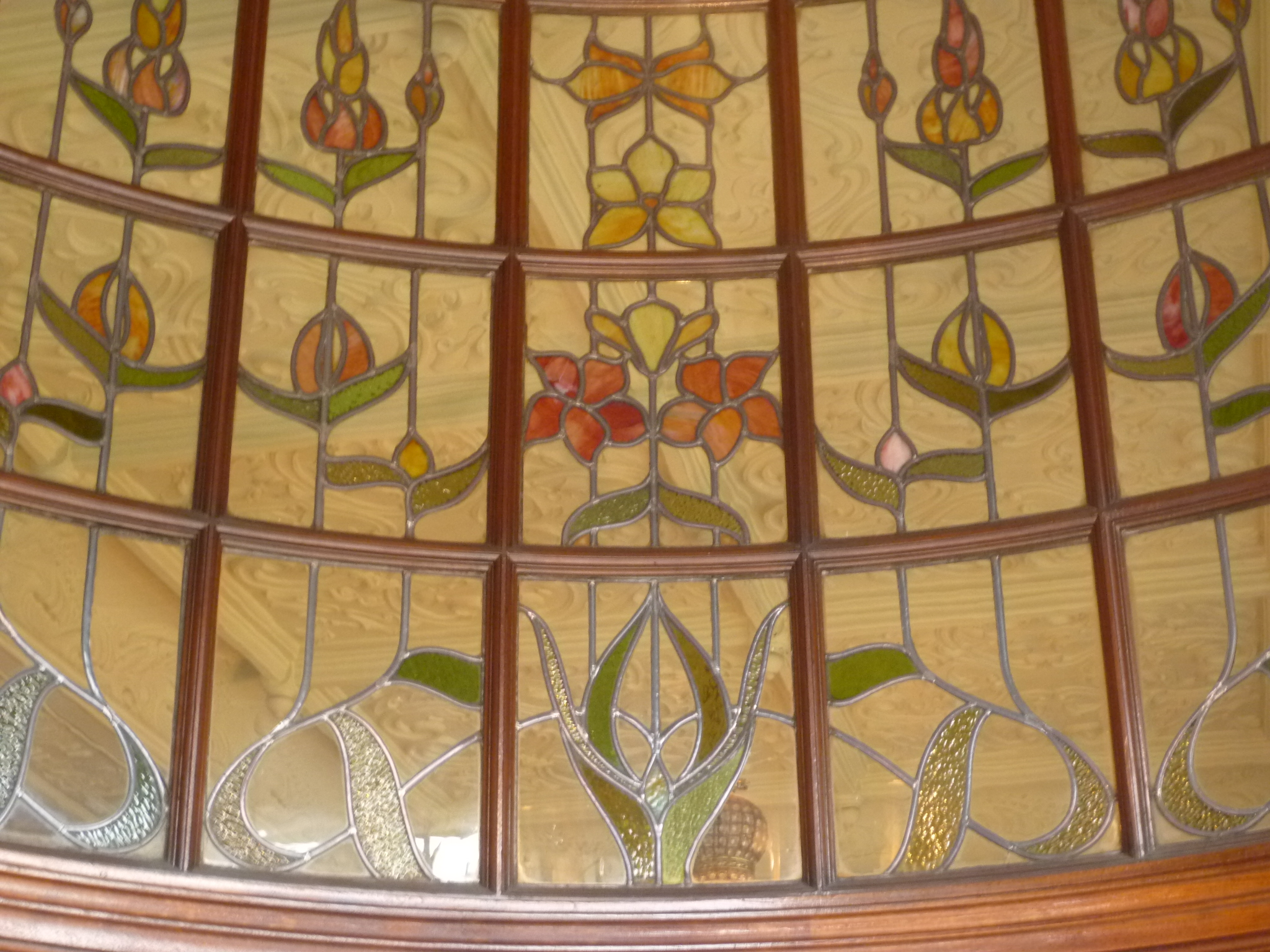
Art Nouveau-style stained glass

== See also ==
- Grade II* listed buildings in the London Borough of Haringey
- The Salisbury, another Grade II*-listed pub designed by John Cathles Hill
