= ArtHouse Crouch End =

Historic building in Crouch End

Arthouse Crouch End
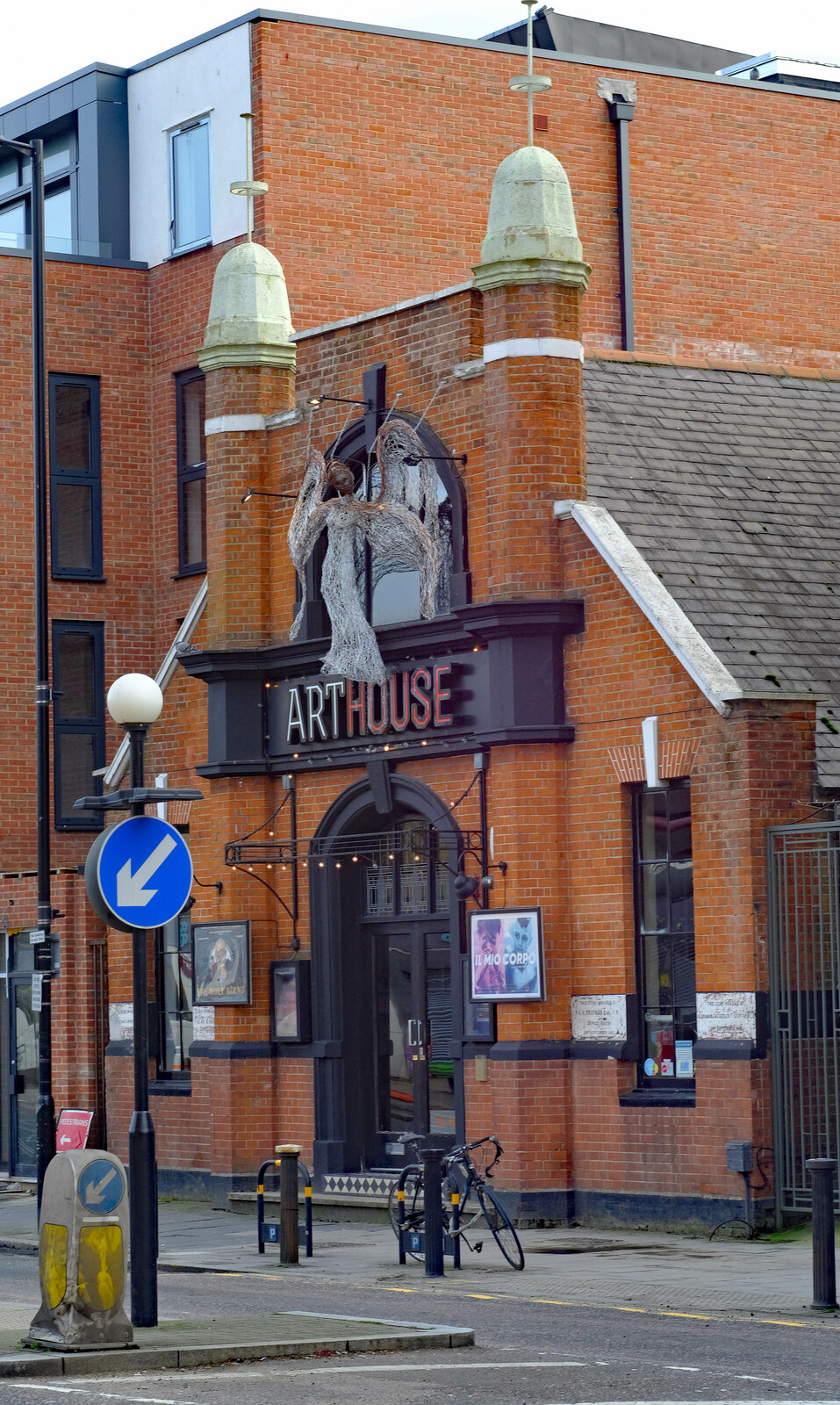
- Interactive map of the Arthouse Crouch End area
- Former names: Salvation Army Hall Citadel

General information
- Architectural style: Ecclesiastical / citadel style
- Location: 159A Tottenham Lane, Crouch End, London, England
- Coordinates: 51°34′55″N 0°07′12″W
- Year built: 1912

Arthouse Crouch End is an independent cinema and arts venue located in Crouch End, within the London Borough of Haringey. Occupying a former Salvation Army Citadel built in 1912, the building was converted into its current form in 2014. It operates as a two-screen cinema and multi-use cultural space.

== History ==
The building at 159A Tottenham Lane was built in 1912 as a Salvation Army Citadel. Its red brick façade and castellated design were intended to evoke a fortress, a style consistent with the Salvation Army's early 20th-century architecture. Foundation stones laid during construction record the involvement of local civic figures and senior members of the organization.

After the Salvation Army vacated the building, it went through several commercial uses. In the 1970s and 1980s, it operated as a snooker hall before being repurposed for nightlife, including a series of bars and live music venues, most notably The Music Palace.

In 2013, Haringey Council granted planning permission for a change of use from nightclub to cinema and theatre. Following internal refurbishment that preserved the building's original shell, Arthouse Crouch End opened in March 2014.

== Architecture ==
The former Citadel is a single-storey red brick structure. While the surrounding Tottenham Lane streetscape has undergone modern redevelopment, the building's exterior remains largely intact. Arthouse Crouch End screens independent, international, and mainstream films. It also hosts live theatre broadcasts, community events, and special screenings.
