= Holy Innocents, Hornsey =

Church in Hornsey, London, England

Coordinates: 51°35′00″N 0°07′04″W

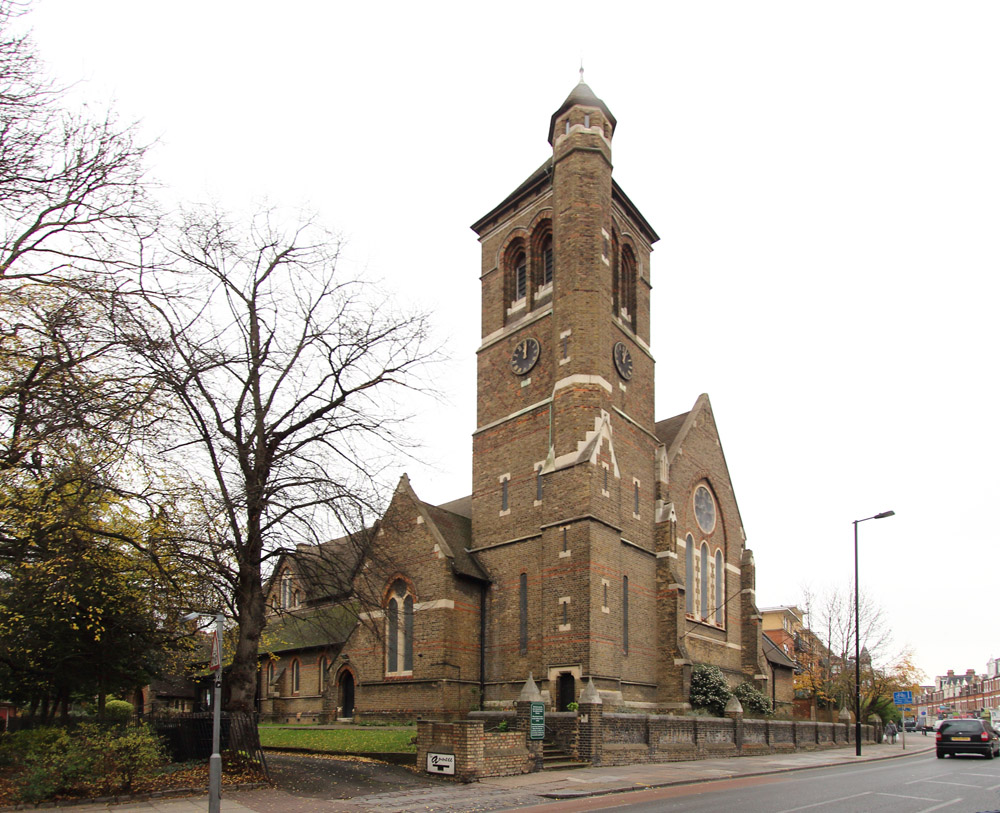
Church of the Holy Innocents

Holy Innocents is a grade II listed Church of England church in Tottenham Lane, Hornsey, London, England. It was built 1875–77 to designs by Arthur Blomfield.
