= Topsfield Hall =

Former house in London

Coordinates: 51.5804°N 0.1235°W

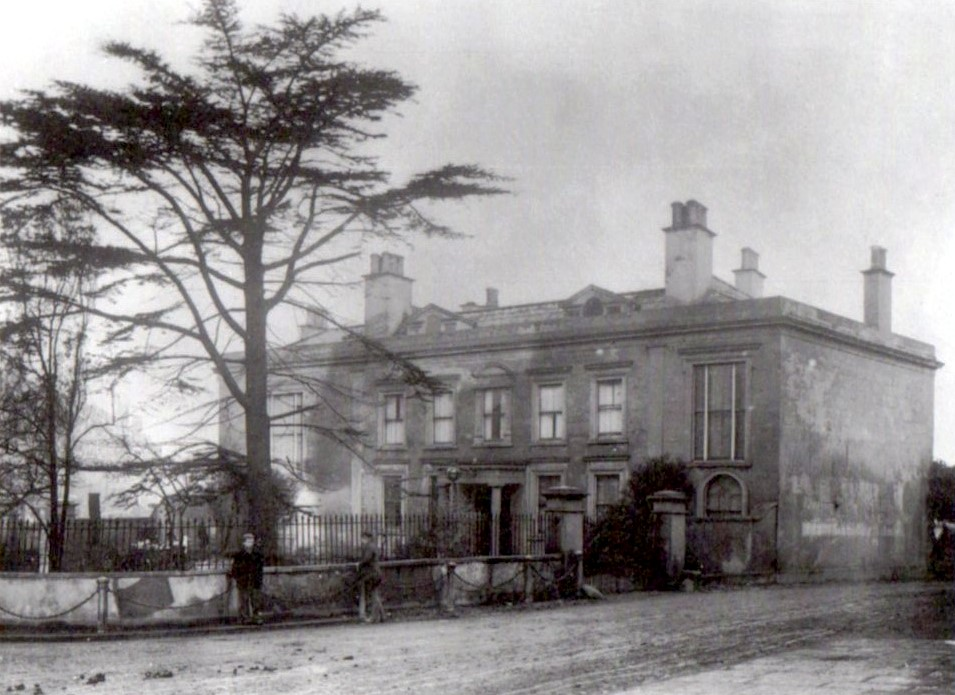
Topsfield Hall in 1894

Topsfield Hall was a Georgian house in Crouch End, London. The Hornsey Historical Society believes it to have been built in around 1785 by Samuel Ellis, and by 1894 it had been demolished.
