= Neville Lumb =

Supplier of commercial sanitaryware

Neville Lumb logo

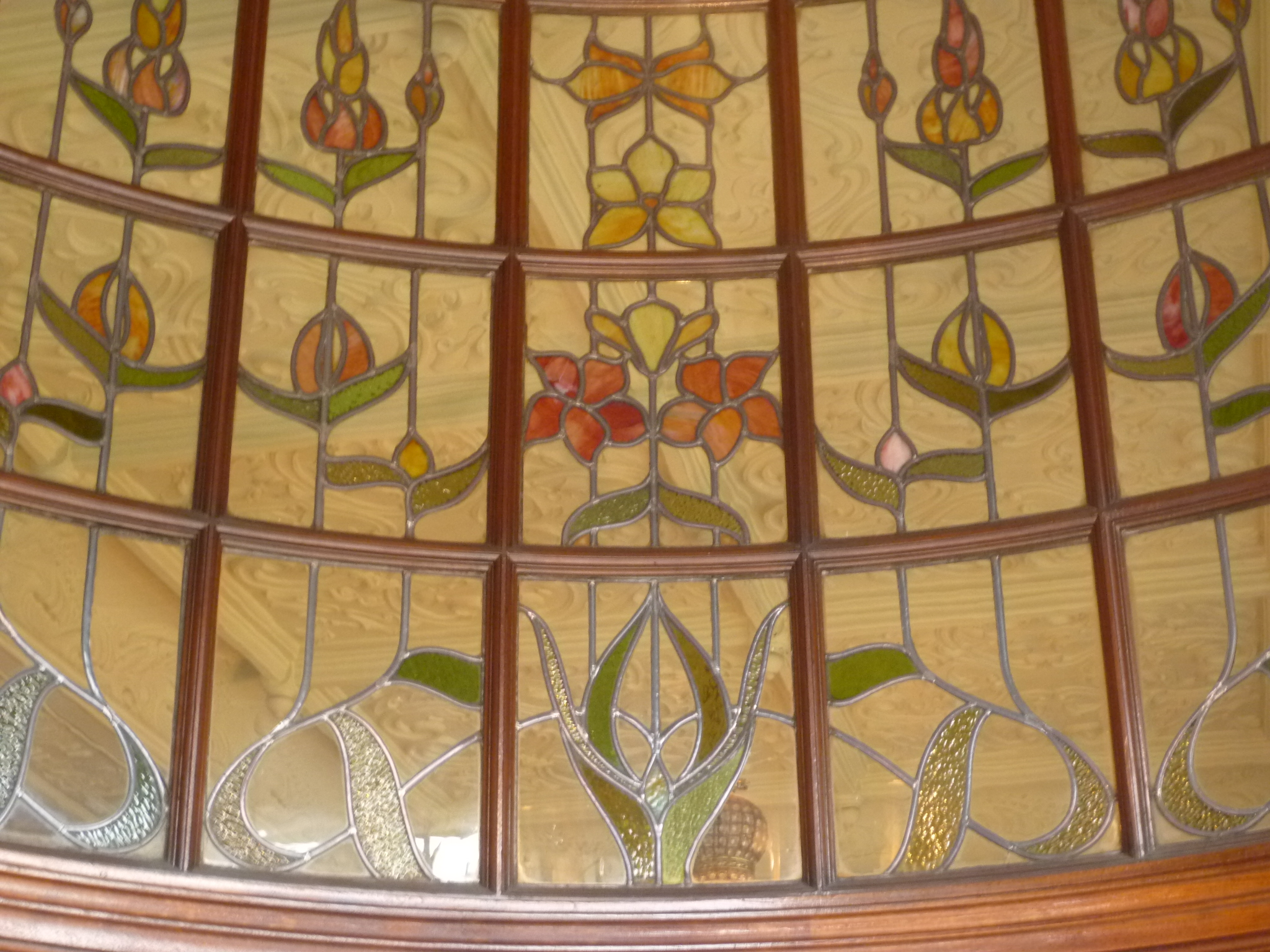
Art Nouveau style stained glass at The Queens public house, Crouch End, c. 1900.

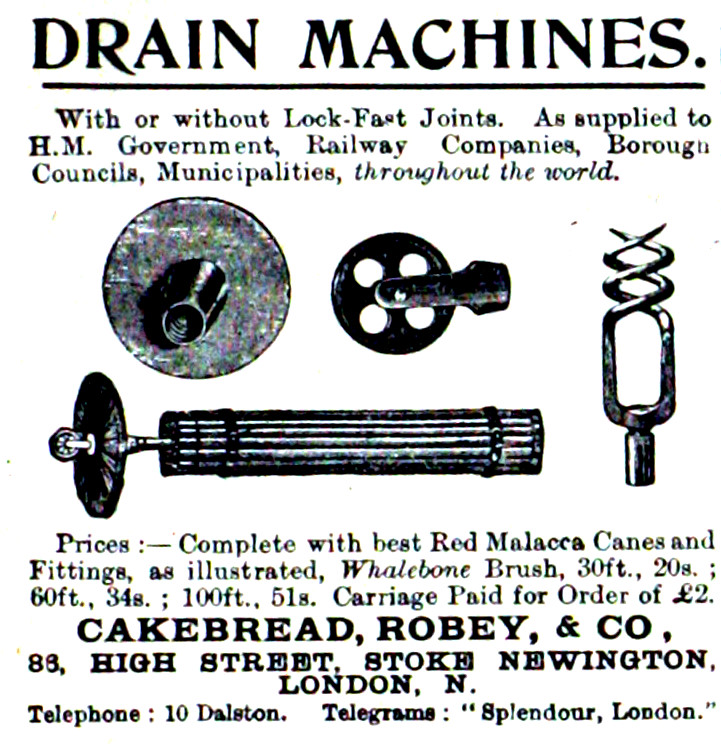
1907 advertising for Cakebread Robey.

Neville Lumb are a supplier of commercial sanitaryware, part of the Saint-Gobain group.

== History ==
The business was founded in 1882 by George H. Cakebread and Arthur E. Robey as Cakebread Robey & Company and became an important supplier of engraved and stained glass to public houses and hotels in England, such as The Queen's Hotel (now The Queens pub) in Crouch End, The Salisbury in Harringay, and St Andrew's church, Chase Side, in Southgate. They were based at Stoke Newington and from around 1914 at Caroba Works, Wood Green, north London. The supply of sanitary fittings was also an important part of their business, and now their principal activity.
