= James Edmondson (builder) =

English property developer (1857–1931)

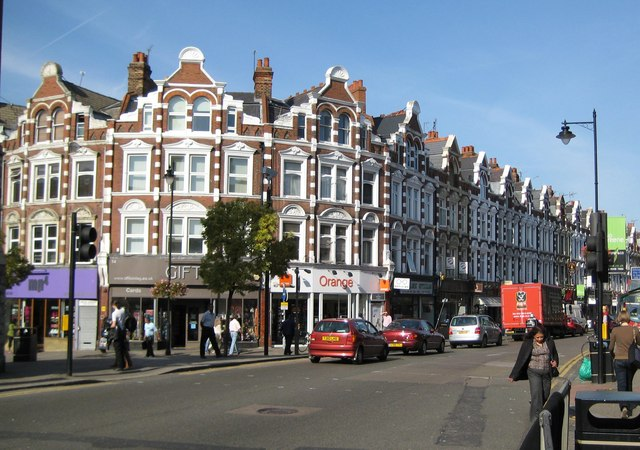
Topsfield Parade, Crouch End.

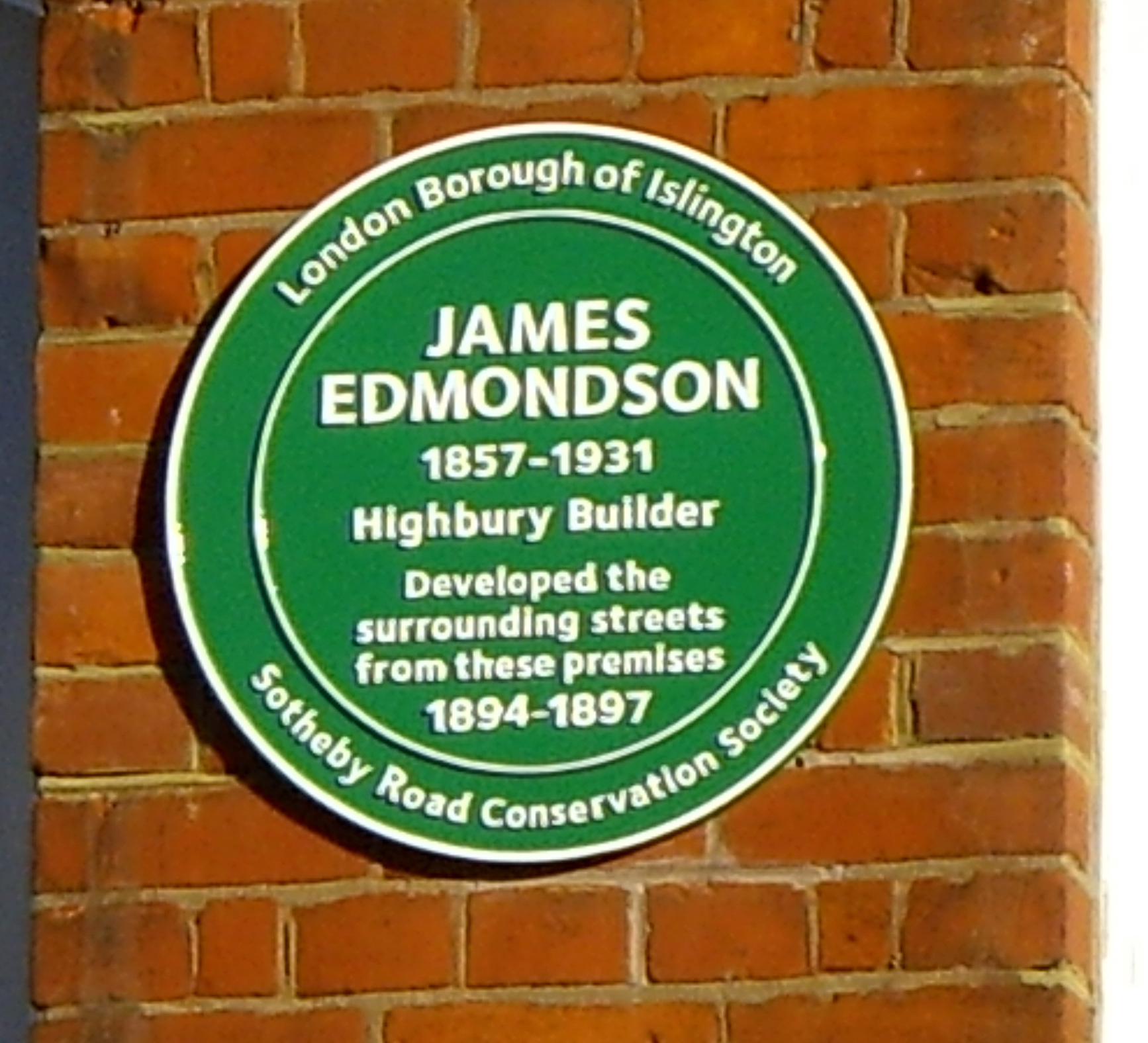
London Borough of Islington plaque at Highbury Park.

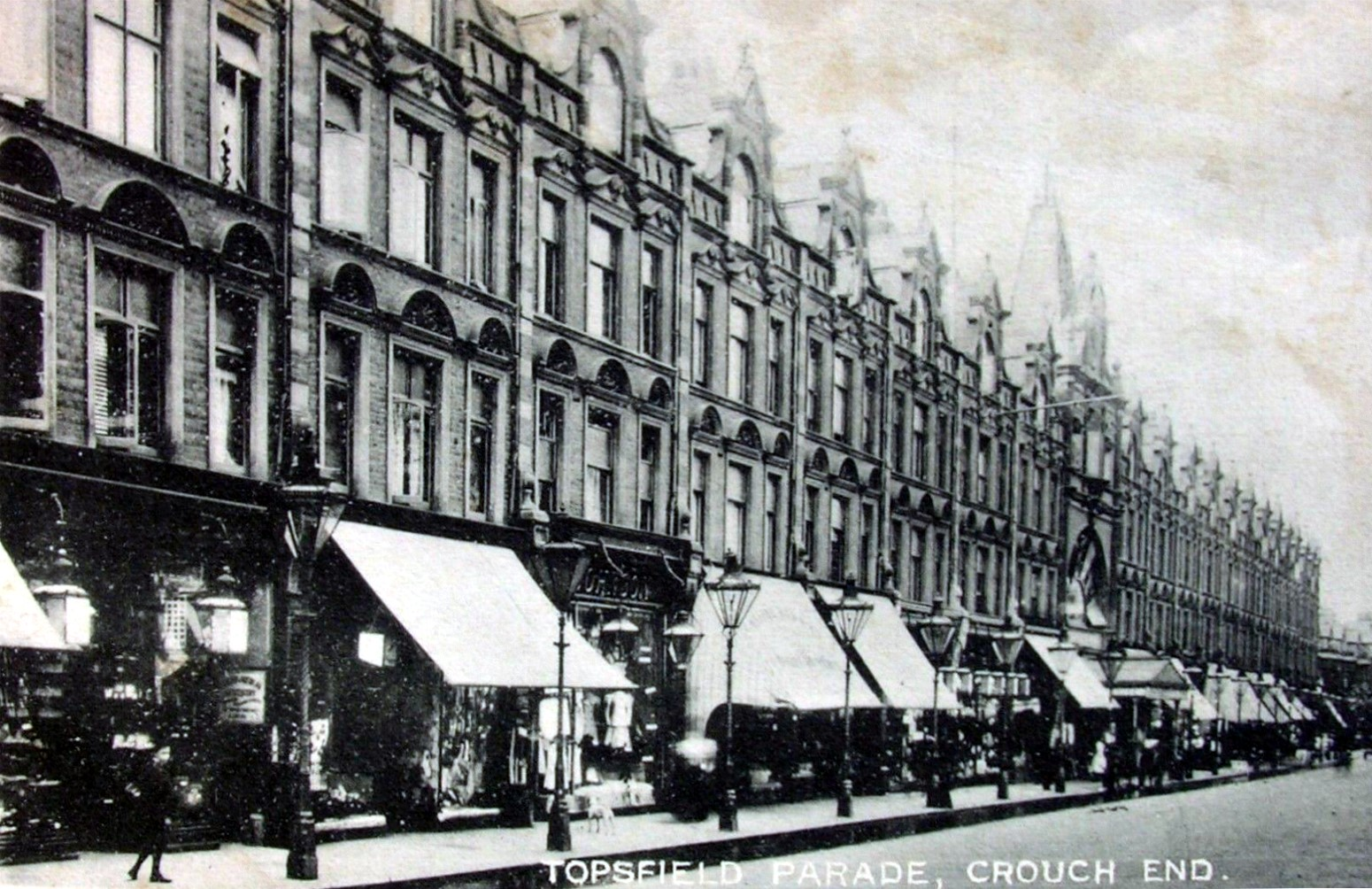
Topsfield Parade in 1914.

James Edmondson (27 August 1857 – 7 June 1931), known as "the Highbury builder", was an English property developer who was responsible for the creation of the Sotheby Road area in Highbury and the development of several notable shopping parades in suburban north London. With William J. Collins, he was instrumental in the creation of modern Muswell Hill.

== Early life ==
James Edmondson was born on 27 August 1857 in Clerkenwell, London, to Isaac Edmondson, a carpenter from Penruddock, Cumberland, and Hannah Edmondson of Westmorland. In 1881, the family were living in a sizeable house at 40 Petherton Road, at which time James was probably working in his father's business.

== Career ==
James at first worked with his father in his building firm. One of their first large projects was a commission with Charles Herbert Shoppe to build a parade of shops at The Broadway in Highbury Park. Their first large solo project was the development of the streets of the Sotheby Road Conservation Area in Highbury. In 1894, trading as the firm of I. Edmondson and Son Limited, they took offices at 8 The Broadway (now 86 Highbury Park). With James in the lead, they developed a formula of residential houses fronted by uniform shopping parades with flats above that they repeated in Crouch End, Muswell Hill, Golders Green, and elsewhere in London. With William J. Collins, James Edmondson was instrumental in the creation of modern Muswell Hill. He retired in 1923 and moved to Bournemouth.

== Personal life ==
Edmondson married Isabel (or Isabele/Isabelle) Anne (or Annie). His eldest son, Albert James Edmondson, joined the family business in the 1920s and later became a Conservative Party member of Parliament and was ennobled as a Baron Sandford in 1945. Their other children were Percival H., Elsee M. and Cyril A. James Edmondson was active in congregationalist circles and worshiped at the Congregational Church in Highbury Quadrant. He was a donor to other non-conformist churches and established the Dudley Lawn Tennis Club. His home was "North Holme" at 12 Aberdeen Terrace (now 52 Aberdeen Road), Highbury.

== Death and legacy ==
Edmondson died at 29 Wimpole Street, London, on 7 June 1931, leaving a widow, Isabel Anne Edmondson, and an estate of £248,170. In 2013, a plaque was placed on his former offices at Highbury Park by members of the Sotheby Road Conservation Society for the London Borough of Islington.

== Selected developments ==
- Crouch End Hippodrome, Topsfield Parade.
- Shopping parades in Golders Green.
- Shopping parades in Muswell Hill.
- Sotheby Road area, Highbury.
- Topsfield Parade, Tottenham Lane, Crouch End.
