= Stationers Park =

Park in the London Borough of Haringey, England

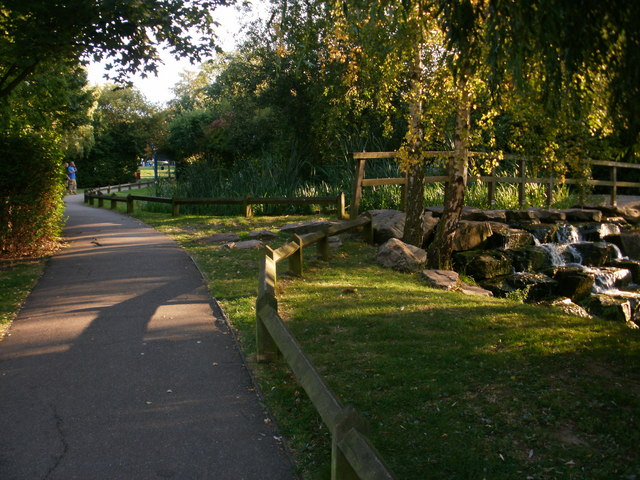

Stationers Park is a 1.5-hectare park between Crouch End, Stroud Green and Harringay, London Borough of Haringey and was opened in 1987. The park sits between Mayfield Road and Denton Road (N8 9LP).

It includes a MUGA (multi-user games area), two tennis courts, an under-7 playground and a junior playground with a massive fort, which has recently had new equipment fitted. It also has an open-air classroom and performance space, and a table tennis table. It has over 200 trees with a massive central weeping willow, two ponds and a thriving café, famous for its cakes. The park is modest but popular with kids, especially since Weston Park Primary School is situated on the park.

The park is managed by Haringey with support from TCV and the Friends of Stationers Park (chair Chris Arnold).

The park holds a number of community events, including the Summer Festival (in association with the Crouch End Festival), Jazz in the Park and Art in the Park. Details and news can be found on the Stationers Park Community Facebook group.

Many locals are puzzled why it's not called Weston Park, the road next to it. The answer is that it is named after the former Stationers' Company's School. The school was founded by the 'Worshipful Company of Stationers and Newspaper Makers' to provide education for sons of those in the printing, newspaper, publishing and allied trade. Originally opened in 1981, the school was relocated in 1983.

As of 2021, it is a winner of the Green Flag Award.

== Nearby transport ==
=== London Underground ===
- Manor House
- Finsbury Park

=== London Overground ===
- Crouch Hill
- Harringay Green Lanes

=== National Rail ===
- Harringay
- Hornsey
