= John Cathles Hill =

British architect

John C Hill

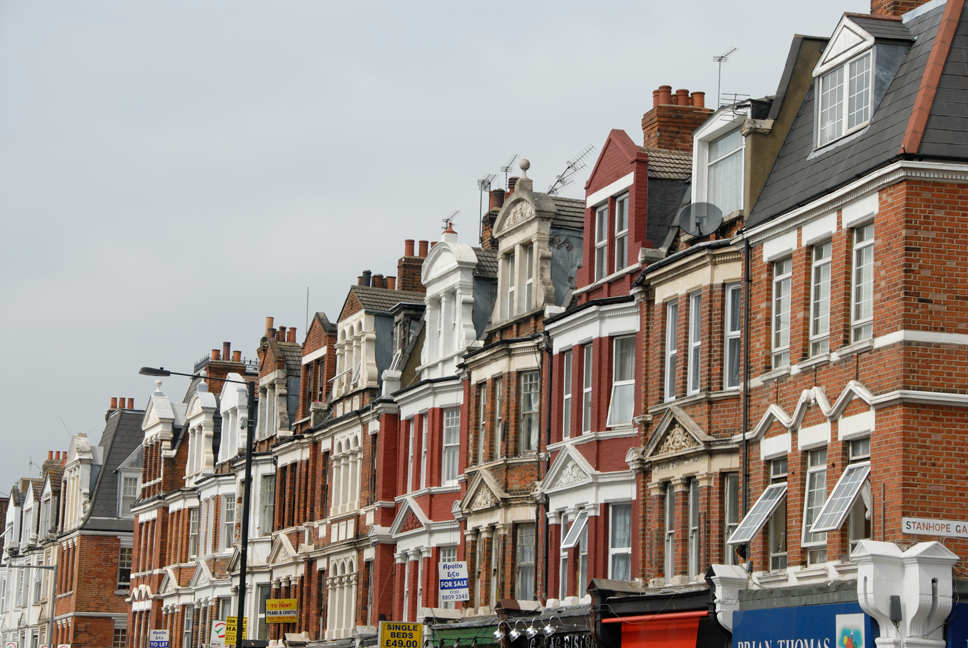
A small stretch of Grand Parade in Harringay

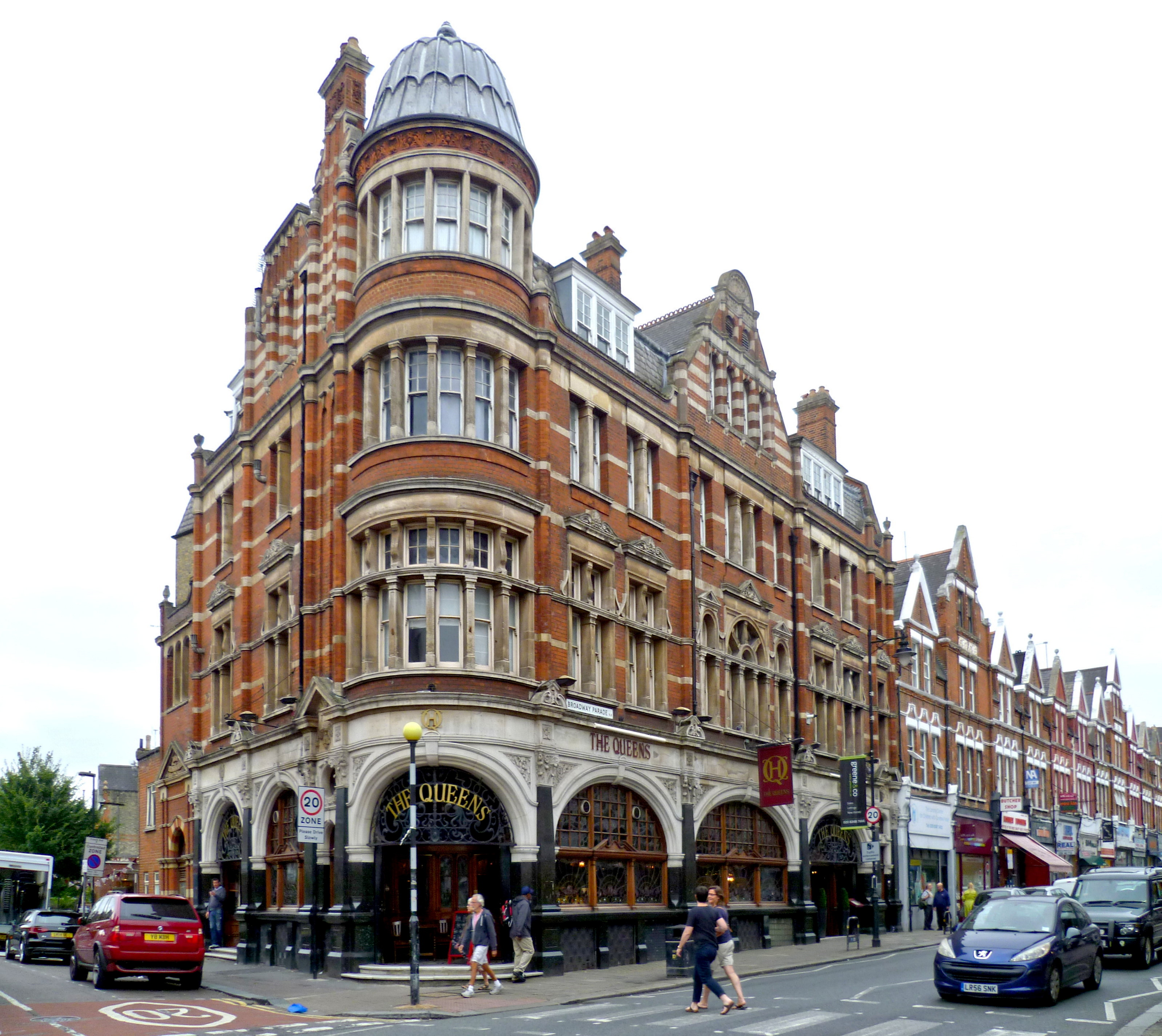
The Queen's Hotel, now pub, Crouch End

John Cathles Hill (1857 – 5 April 1915) was a property developer and brick manufacturer who was influential in the development of parts of suburban north London.

== Early life ==
John C. Hill was born in Hawkhill, Dundee, on 12 December 1857, the eldest son of Robert Hill and his wife Eliza, née Cathles. He had two brothers and three sisters, one of whom died in infancy. When he was three years old his family moved to the village of Auchterhouse in the county of Angus. His father was tollhouse keeper at Auchterhouse which he combined with working as a cartwright and joiner.

== Business career ==
When Hill was seventeen he left home and became a self-employed journeyman carpenter and joiner. After two years he settled in Glasgow where he attended the Mechanics' Institute. There he learned the principles of architecture and construction. At the age of 21 he moved to London, where a relative, George Cathles Porter, was working as a speculative builder in Hornsey. After quickly establishing himself as a joiner, Hill was able to set up his own joinery business within a year. His business was successful and it was not long before he was exploiting the suburban building boom and building houses. By 1881 he was living as a boarder at 9 Albert Road, off the Seven Sisters Road. He was described as a "builder employing 8 men". His first offices were established in Archway, London.

=== North London ===
Hill became a prolific developer in North London. Records indicate that he was responsible for building 2,397 houses in or near London and in the city of Peterborough. He focussed on suburban communities for the middle classes complete with houses, shops and pubs. In the 1890s he built up a good part of Harringay, North London. In addition to a few streets of terraced houses to the east of Green Lanes, the development also included a magnificent terrace of shops, Grand Parade, and a vast ornate public house, The Salisbury. He is also credited with large developments in Crouch End including the Grade II* listed Queens pub in Crouch End (and is also in CAMRA's National inventory), the Broadway Parade on the western side of Crouch End Broadway and the Rathcoole estate in Hornsey.

As a developer Hill experienced a shortage of bricks. He resolved this problem by acquiring a brickfield at Fletton in 1889. This eventually became the London Brick Company. At his Fletton works, he built a huge kiln, called 'Napoleon' which was the biggest in the world.

Hill also owned a chain of five off-licences in north London. When his businesses ran into trouble, these five were taken over by his cousin William Cathles and some survived till the middle of the Twentieth century.

In 1910 Hill founded a national association of brick manufacturers to try to tackle the trade's endemic competition which had been threatening its ruin.

Like most builders of the period, Hill financed his operations through mortgages. At the beginning of the twentieth century Hill's financial position deteriorated and in 1912 Hill was declared bankrupt with a deficit of over one million pounds. Hill told the bankruptcy court that his failure had been brought about by the Finance Act, 1909, which had entirely destroyed the value the equities his mortgages.

== Other appointments ==
Outside his building business, Hill had various other appointments. He was a local councillor in Fletton and served on the London County Council as member for Islington North from 1909 to 1912, when he resigned.

In 1896 he was appointed as a director for Olympia Ltd, who owned and ran the Olympia Stadium in London.

== Family and personal life ==
When he first moved to London Hill was recorded as living at 9 Albert Road, Tottenham, Middlesex. In 1882 he married a grocer's daughter, Matilda Mose, and by 1885 they had moved to 32 Archway Road. In 1890 they were living in Highgate, at the top of Whitehall Park. Four years later, success enabled a further move to a pseudo-gothic mansion called Southwood Hall at the junction of Muswell Hill Road and Wood Lane in Highgate.

In 1905 the family moved out of Southwood and into a mansion flat in Hornsey Gardens, albeit an elegant one.

== Death and legacy ==
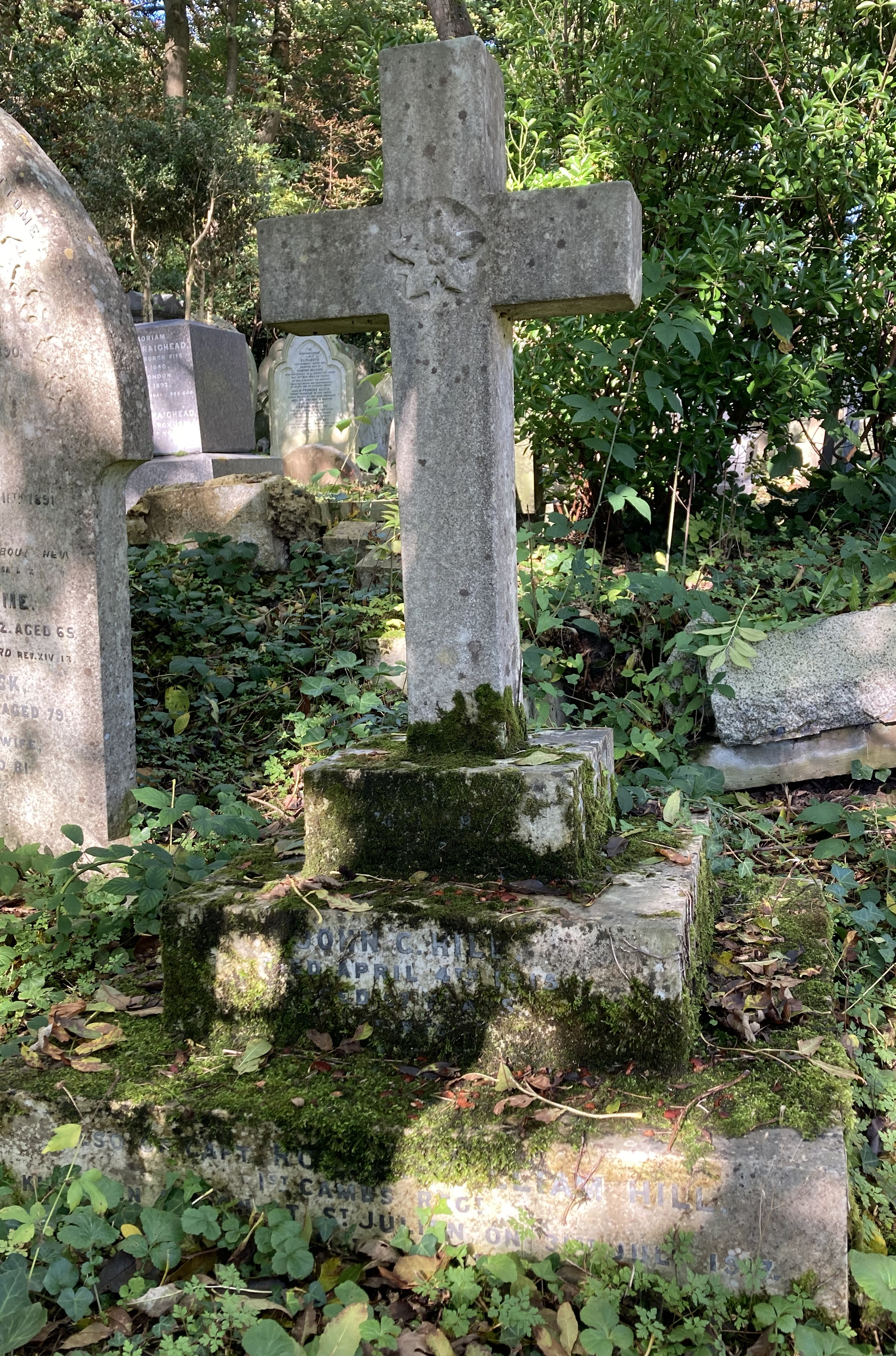
Grave of John Cathles Hill in Highgate Cemetery

For the last four years of his life Hill suffered from cirrhosis of the liver. He died of a heart attack on 5 April 1915 at 20 Ventnor Villas, Hove, while on a visit to the resort.

He is buried on the eastern side of Highgate Cemetery. His wife Matilda was buried with him after her death in 1939 at the age of 79.
