= James Edmondson, 1st Baron Sandford =

British politician (1887–1959)

Baron Sandford DL
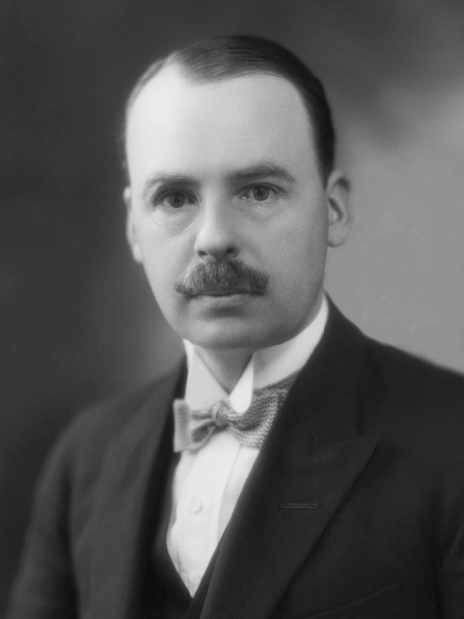

Government Deputy Chief Whip in the House of Commons
- In office 6 December 1944 – 26 July 1945 Serving with Leslie Pym; William John
- Prime Minister: Winston Churchill
- Preceded by: John McEwen; Leslie Pym; William John
- Succeeded by: George Mathers

Treasurer of the Household
- In office 12 March 1942 – 26 July 1945
- Prime Minister: Winston Churchill
- Preceded by: Robert Grimston
- Succeeded by: George Mathers

Vice-Chamberlain of the Household
- In office 12 November 1939 – 12 March 1942
- Prime Minister: Neville Chamberlain; Winston Churchill
- Preceded by: Robert Grimston
- Succeeded by: William Boulton

Member of Parliament for Banbury
- In office 15 November 1922 – 26 July 1945
- Preceded by: Rhys Rhys-Williams
- Succeeded by: Douglas Dodds-Parker

Personal details
- Born: Albert James Edmondson; 29 June 1887
- Died: 16 May 1959 (aged 71)
- Party: Conservative
- Parent: James Edmondson

Albert James Edmondson, 1st Baron Sandford DL (29 June 1887 – 16 May 1959), was a British Conservative Party politician.

== Early life ==
He was the oldest son of James Edmondson, the north London property developer.

== Political career ==
At the 1922 general election, he was elected to the House of Commons as Member of Parliament (MP) for Banbury. He was knighted in the 1934 Birthday Honours by King George V. From 1939 to 1942, he served as a government whip, with the title of Vice-Chamberlain of the Household. He held his parliamentary seat until he stepped down at the 1945 general election. He was elevated to the peerage as Baron Sandford, of Banbury in the County of Oxford on 14 July 1945.

Edmondson was a member of the pro-Nazi Right Club. He died in Westminster aged 71.

== Arms ==
Coat of arms of James Edmondson, 1st Baron Sandford

Crest
In front of a portcullis Or a dexter arm embowed in armour fesswise the hand clenched Proper.
Escutcheon
Azure a cross couped and pointed between in chief two lions combatant and in base as many swans' wings elevated and addorsed respectant all Or.
Supporters
On either side a pikeman of the Honourable Artillery Company armed and accoutred supporting with the exterior hand a pike erect Proper the dexter charged with a portcullis chained Or and the sinister with an oak tree eradicated and fructed also Proper the trunk pierced by three arrows Or flighted Azure (the badge of the Edmonson family).
Motto
Cuicunque Ferienti Aperietur

Parliament of the United Kingdom
Preceded by Sir Rhys Rhys-Williams	Member of Parliament for Banbury; 1922–1945	Succeeded by Douglas Dodds-Parker
Political offices
Preceded by Robert Grimston	Vice-Chamberlain of the Household; 1939–1942	Succeeded by William Whytehead Boulton
Preceded by Robert Grimston	Treasurer of the Household; 1942–1945	Succeeded by George Mathers
Preceded by Leslie Pym; John McEwen	Deputy Chief Whip of the House of Commons; 1944–1945; With: William John; Leslie Pym	Succeeded by George Mathers
Party political offices
Preceded by Leslie Pym; John McEwen	Conservative Deputy Chief Whip in the House of Commons; 1944–1945; Served alongside: Leslie Pym	Succeeded by Patrick Buchan-Hepburn
Peerage of the United Kingdom
New creation	Baron Sandford; 1945–1959	Succeeded by John Cyril Edmondson
