= The Salisbury =

Listed pub in Harringay, London, England

- The pub in 2026

- Location within London Borough of Haringey Location within Greater London
- Alternative names: The Salisbury Hotel

General information
- Type: Public house with a flat above; originally a pub-hotel
- Architectural style: French Renaissance
- Location: 1 Grand Parade, Green Lanes, Harringay, London, England
- Coordinates: 51°34′56.2″N 0°05′57.9″W
- Year built: 1898–1899; 127 years ago
- Renovated: 2003 (refurbished)
- Owner: Salamis Trading Ltd

Design and construction
- Architect: John Cathles Hill
- Other designers: Cakebread Robey (engraved glass)
- Designations

Listed Building – Grade II*
- Official name: The Salisbury public house
- Designated: 10 May 1974
- Reference no.: 1358865

Website
- thesalisburyhotelpub.co.uk

The Salisbury is a Grade II* listed public house on Grand Parade, Green Lanes, in Harringay, London, England. Designed by John Cathles Hill and opened in 1899, it is noted for its French Renaissance-style exterior and largely intact late Victorian interior. The pub is included on the Campaign for Real Ale (CAMRA)'s National Inventory of Historic Pub Interiors, where it holds a three-star rating indicating an interior of "outstanding national historic importance".

== History ==
The Salisbury was designed and built by John Cathles Hill, founder of The London Brick Company. The pub opened in 1899, with W. A. Cathles, a cousin of Hill, as its manager. Its construction cost £30,000, equivalent to approximately £3.33 million as of 2025.

Contemporary trade publications took note of the building; The Licensed Victualler and Catering Trades' Journal described it in highly favourable terms:

The position it occupies with regard to other "houses" is unique, because of its combination of several distinct establishments. In this it is a paradox, as the hotel, restaurant and public house which it comprises are distinct, but they are nevertheless equally one. The hotel is one of the finest which exists at the present day; it is one also which will take a genius to eclipse.....and the district (in which it was built) has been turned into one of London's finest suburbs.

On 10 May 1974, The Salisbury was designated a Grade II* listed building. The Campaign for Real Ale (CAMRA) regards it as having an interior of "outstanding national historic importance" and awards it a three-star rating on its National Inventory of Historic Pub Interiors. Alterations made in 2003 included the installation of a black-and-white marble floor in the corner bar and the replacement of a stolen Cakebread Robey mirror with a modern copy.

In 2008, beer and architecture experts Geoff Brandwood and Jane Jephcote, selected The Salisbury as one of London's top ten heritage pubs in their book, London Heritage Pubs – An Inside Story.

In 2023, Time Out magazine ranked The Salisbury ninth in its list of the Top 50 Pubs in London. As of June 2026, the freehold was owned by Salamis Trading Ltd, and the pub was leased to Remarkable Pubs.

== Architecture ==
=== Exterior ===
The building was designed in the French Renaissance style and has three storeys, an attic level, and a mansard roof. It is constructed of red brick with stone detailing and stands on a prominent corner site. Architectural features include shaped gables, domed corner cupolas, large dormer windows, and a central tower topped by an iron crown. The ground floor is faced in Portland stone above a granite plinth, with polished granite columns and pilasters framing the frontage. The windows and entrances retain decorative engraved glass, wrought-iron screens, tiled entrance lobbies, and mosaic floors.

=== Interior ===
The pub's interior was described by the architectural historian Mark Girouard as "magnificently elaborate and complete".

On the first floor there is a large room at the front which was formerly used as a restaurant and concert room. It has an elaborate compartmented ceiling with fibrous plasterwork by the Mural Decoration Company. Engraved glass by Cakebread Robey survives in the doors separating the residential part of the building from the rest of the premises. This floor was later used as a church, before being converted into an apartment. The upper floor contains numerous small bedrooms, each retaining fireplaces and overmantels of varying designs, as well as a kitchen with built-in shelving and a large recess for a range. Original features also survive in the stair halls, including radiators, black-and-white tiled floors, panelling, decorative door surrounds, wrought-iron gas-light fittings, and a former tiled lavatory area.

The bar area has a compartmented ceiling supported by cast-iron columns. There is a large curved wooden bar with a stone trough at its base, forming a complete rectangle serving all parts of the space. The saloon and public bars are divided by a wooden arched screen containing glass engraved with Art Nouveau motifs. At the rear is the former billiard room, now a function room and kitchen, with top-lit roof glass painted with a creeping vine motif. The interior also retains engraved mirrors, stained-glass windows and decorative fire surrounds. The building has two staircases, one of wood and the other with cast-iron balusters.

== Gallery ==
Architectural detail on the Salisbury

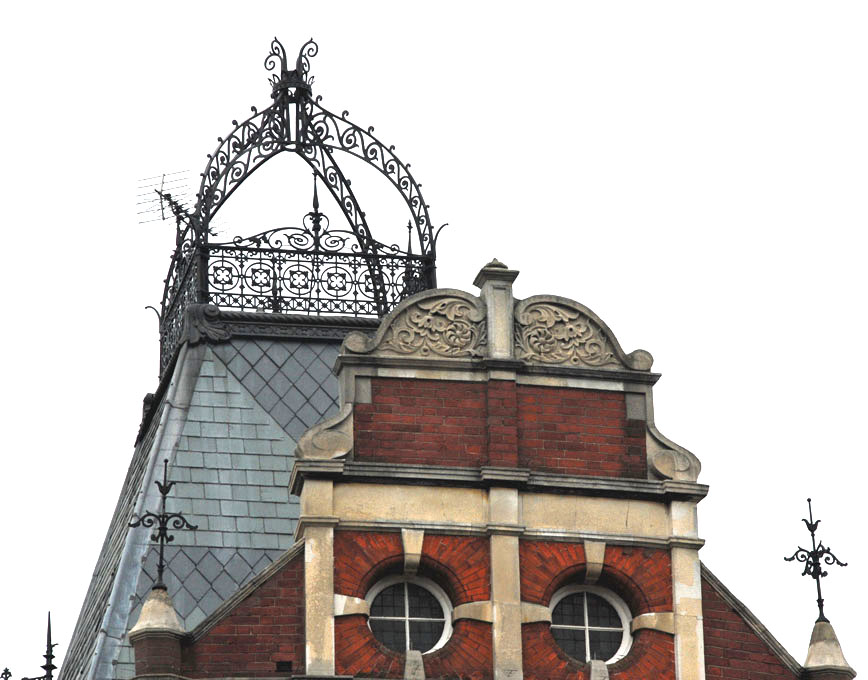
Ironwork crown

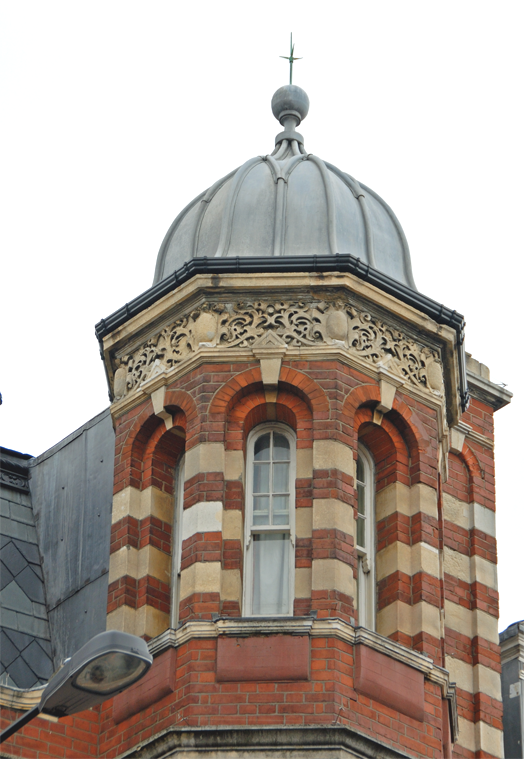
South west tower

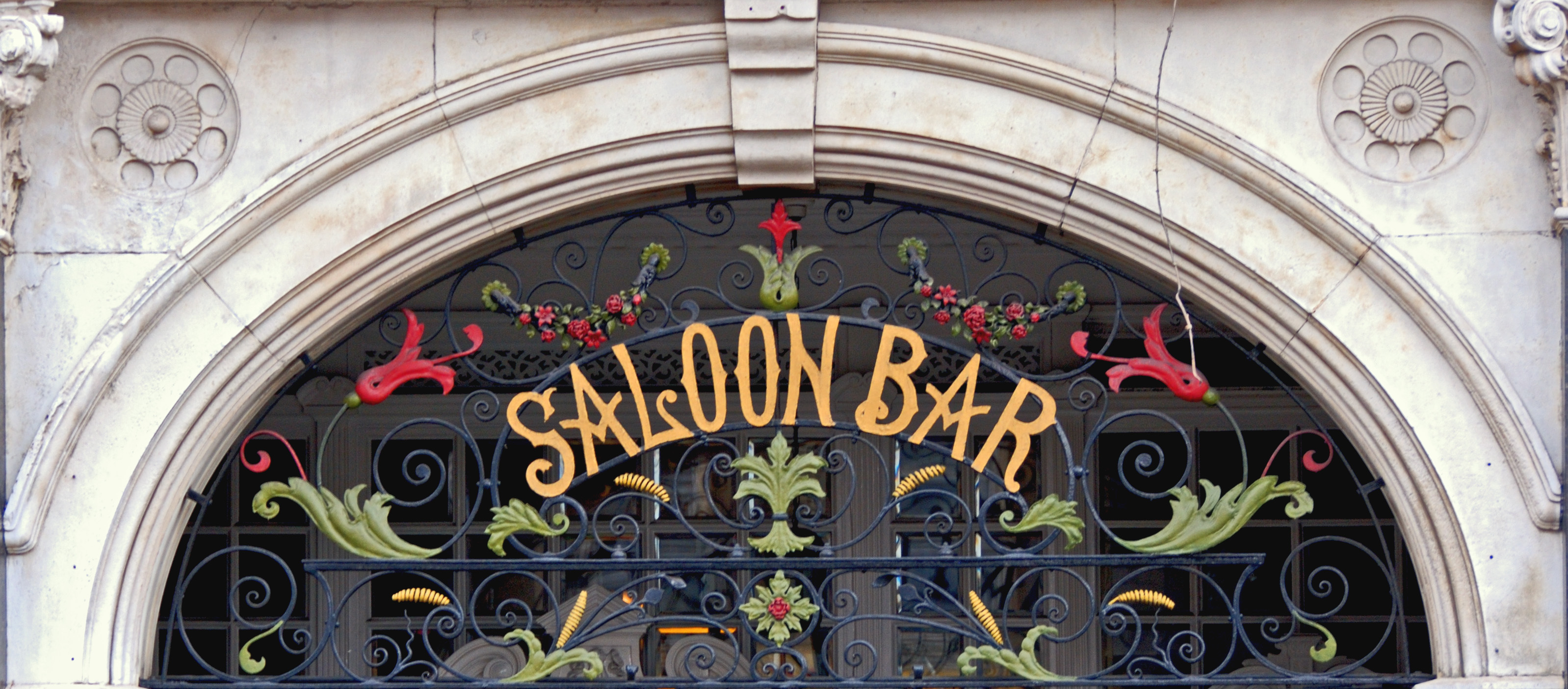
Decorative iron fretwork above south west entrance

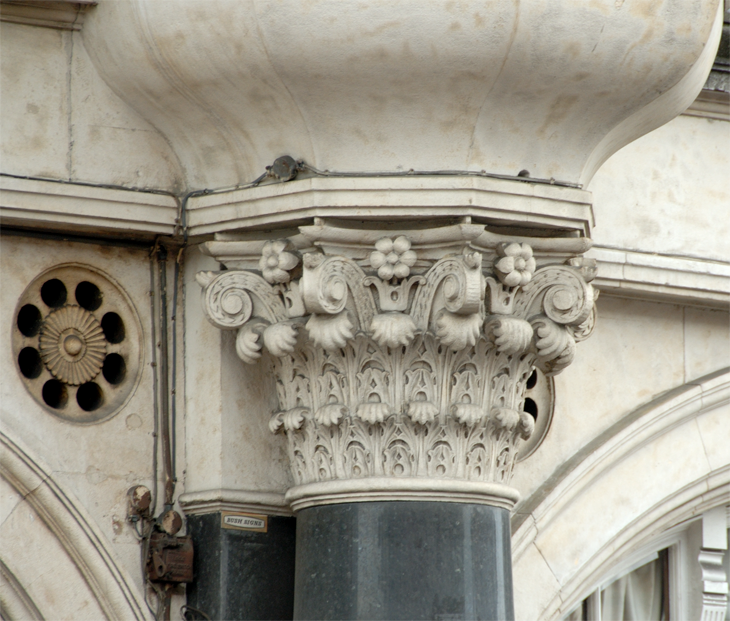
Larvikite column with ornate capital

== In popular culture ==
The pub has been used as a filming location, including for The Long Good Friday (1980), Chaplin (1992), and Spider (2002).

== See also ==
- Grade II* listed buildings in the London Borough of Haringey
- The Queens, Crouch End, another Grade II*-listed pub designed by John Cathles Hill
