= Crouch End Hippodrome =

Former theatre in London N8, England

Coordinates: 51.5810°N 0.1229°W

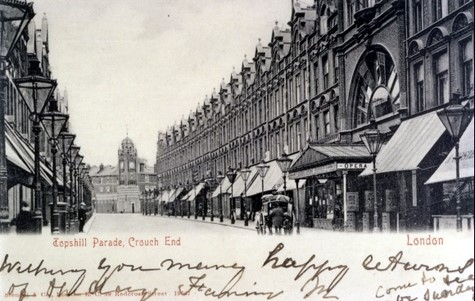
Crouch End Hippodrome on a c.1900 postcard.

The ill-fated Crouch End Hippodrome, originally the Queen's Opera House, was a theatre that once stood in the middle of Topsfield Parade on the western side of Tottenham Lane, Crouch End, London.

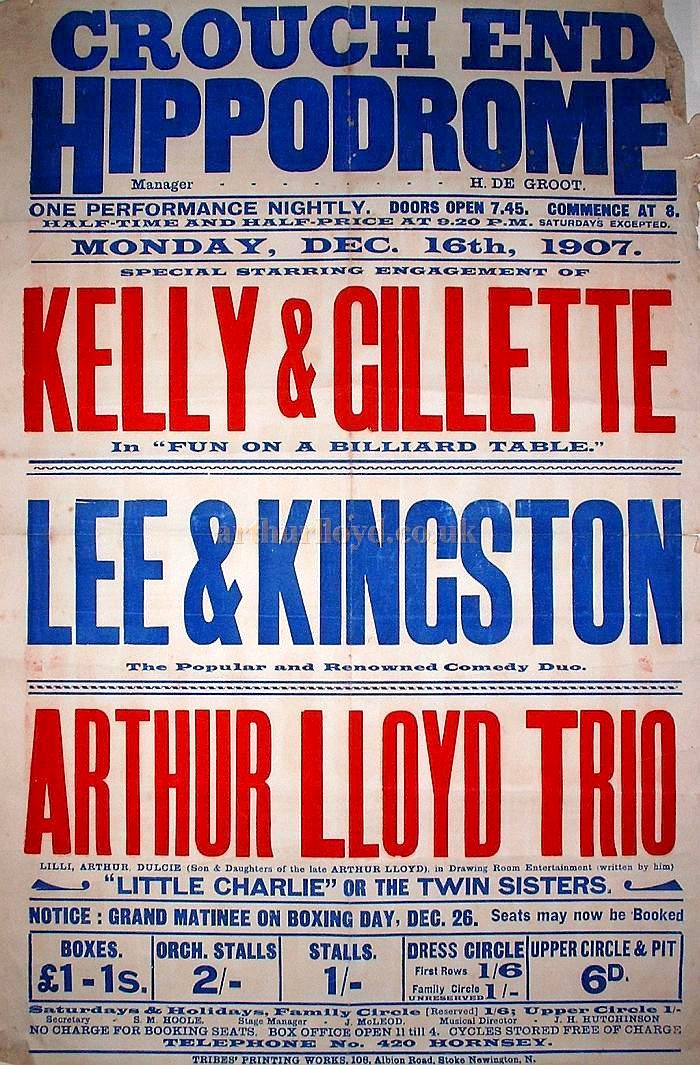
Poster for the Crouch End Hippodrome, 1907.

The venue opened on 27th July 1897 as the Queen's Opera House with the smash-hit musical comedy, The Geisha. The venue had originally been conceived as a space for public meetings and the like and was to be opened as the Crouch End Athenaeum, but commercial pressures led it being reimagined as an entertainment venue. It was transformed into a variety venue when it reopened in 1907 after a three-year closure following a bad fire. Later it was a cinema before being damaged by bombing during the Second World War and subsequently demolished apart from the front which still stands in Topsfield Parade.

== See also ==
- The Queens, Crouch End
