= North West London Credit Union =

Credit Union in the United Kingdom (1998–2013)

- Founded: 1998 (Barnet Council 1996)
- Dissolved: 2013 (transfer of engagements)
- Type: Industrial and Provident Society
- Location: 4-5 The Concourse, Grahame Park, London NW9 5XB

North West London Credit Union Limited was a savings and loans co-operative, operating in the north west London boroughs of Barnet and Brent. Based in Grahame Park, the credit union had over 1,000 members and branches in Burnt Oak, Edgware, and Finchley. In 2013, it merged with London Capital Credit Union and the branches were closed.

== History ==
The credit union was founded in 1998, as the Watling and Grahame Park Credit Union, by residents of the suburbs of Burnt Oak and Colindale. In 2010, it merged with Barnet Council Employees Credit Union (established 1996) and Finchley Credit Union (established 2000), changing its name the same year.

== Activities ==
A member of the Association of British Credit Unions Limited, registered under the Industrial and Provident Societies Acts, North West London Credit Union was authorised by the Prudential Regulation Authority and regulated by the Financial Conduct Authority and PRA. Ultimately, like the banks and building societies, members’ savings were protected against business failure by the Financial Services Compensation Scheme.

Although the credit union was operating efficiently, it was struggling to meet capital requirements recently raised by the regulators. In 2012, the directors approached London Capital Credit Union with a view to merger. The transfer of engagements was completed in 2013, ending 15 years of independent trading.

== See also ==
- Credit unions in the United Kingdom
- British co-operative movement
