= Mountview House Group =

- Founded: 2004 (1953)
- Type: Private company limited by shares
- Location: Mountview House, Lennox Road, London N4 3TX
- Website: mvhg.co.uk

Mountview House Group Limited was a taxi holding company, based in Finsbury Park in the north London borough of Islington, comprising Radio Taxis, Xeta and One Transport. In 2016, it was acquired by Gett, Inc.

== History ==
Originally formed in 1953 as Radio Taxicabs (Southern) Limited, a licensed hackney carriage owner-driver co-operative, which became Radio Taxicabs (London) Limited in 1973, the business demutualised in 2004, as Radio Taxis Group Limited.

The following year, the company acquired Xeta, a smaller niche private hire circuit and, in 2006/7, the One Transport platform, a nationwide ground transport management system, was developed.

In 2014, Radio Taxis Group became Mountview House Group, after a historical nickname deriving from the firm's original MOUntview 3232 telephone number.

=== Legal case ===
In the case of Radio Taxicabs (London) Ltd. v Owner Drivers Radio Taxi Services Ltd. [2004] RPC 351, a rival firm trading as Dial-a-Cab set up a website at www.dialacab.co.uk with a re-direct from www.radiotaxis.com. Radio Taxicabs, owner of the www.radiotaxis.co.uk domain, contended that this constituted actionable passing off. The judgement held that although Radio Taxicabs did have a reputation within the industry as "Radio Taxis," it did not have such a reputation amongst members of the general public and that the words were not distinctive of the business.

=== Credit union ===
Radio Taxicabs (London) Credit Union Limited was a savings and loans co-operative set up in 1987, to help London taxi drivers and their families access affordable credit and secure savings. It was a member of the Association of British Credit Unions Limited.

In 2013, the directors of Radio Taxicabs Credit Union approached London Capital Credit Union with a view to merger. In 2014, after 27 years of independent trading, members of the credit union unanimously voted in favour of the transfer of engagements and London Capital's common bond was extended to include employees of Mountview House Group.

== See also ==
- Taxicabs of the United Kingdom
- Credit unions in the United Kingdom
- British co-operative movement
