= London Capital Credit Union =

Credit union in the United Kingdom

- Founded: 1997 (Hornsey Co-operative 1964)
- Type: Industrial and Provident Society
- Location: The Jeremy Hopgood Rooms, Caxton House, 129 St John's Way, London N19 3RQ
- Key people: Helen Baron, President; Martin Groombridge, Chief Executive
- Website: credit-union.coop

London Capital Credit Union Limited is a not-for-profit member-owned financial co-operative, based in Archway and operating across London and the South East.

Founded in 1997, by 2025, the credit union had over 20,000 members.

== History ==
Islington Council Employees Credit Union was originally established in 1997, to provide secure savings and low cost flexible loans for employees of Islington Council. It became Islington and City Credit Union in 2007, briefly Haringey, Islington and City Credit Union (with the support of Haringey Council) in 2011 and finally adopted the current name, broadening its catchment to include Barnet, Brent, Camden, City of London, Enfield, Hackney, Haringey, Islington & Waltham Forest .

One of Britain's first registered credit unions, Hornsey Co-operative Credit Union and the neighbouring North West London Credit Union transferred engagements in 2013, followed by the smaller Radio Taxicabs Credit Union in 2014.

David Lammy, Labour member of Parliament for Tottenham, was signed into membership in 2014, followed by Dave Prentis, General Secretary of the public service trade union, UNISON (then President of Unity Trust Bank and a non-executive director of the Bank of England). UNISON's registered charity, There for You, has been working in partnership with the credit union since 2013.

In 2015, a merger with the small Rainbow Credit Union for Co-operative members and employees in London and the South East proved impractical; it was placed into administration and ceased trading on 14 September. Notable for being one of the first credit unions to lend money to businesses, the neighbouring North London Credit Union transferred engagements in 2023.

== Activities ==
The credit union promotes thrift by the accumulation of savings, creating sources of credit at a fair and reasonable rate of interest by using savings for the mutual benefit. Its objects include the training and education of members in the wise use of money and in the management of their financial affairs.

Credit unions form part of the wider international co-operative movement and can be found in 97 countries, with over 184 million members. In the UK there are currently 362 credit unions, offering an alternative to payday lenders to some 1.2 million members. Membership of London Capital Credit Union is restricted by Common bond of association / common bond to individuals living or working in the London & the South East, members of the South East Region of The Co-operative Group and the Greater London & Eastern Region of Unite the Union or employees of over 100 of employers across the UK..

=== Products ===
London Capital Credit Union runs salary savings and loans schemes in conjunction with over 100 national and local employers. It also offers a Prize Saver Scheme with a monthly free prize draw for £5,000 as an incentive to save. The credit union is responsible for the operation of the salary scheme, with the employer facilitating monthly deductions from salary.

Low cost Saver Loans allocate part of the repayment to a share account, which means that as members repay loans their savings continue to grow. The credit union also offer a range of other products, including short-term and home-owner loans; credit builder loans, designed to help people repair their credit rating; and security loans, to encourage members not to withdraw their savings. CredEcardplus is a reloadable prepaid card that works in a similar way to a High Street bank account. The credit union has a 94% approval rate for its saver loans.

The credit union is an accredited London living wage employer. In 2015, the Fairbanking Foundation awarded London Capital Credit Union five stars for personal loan products in its first Mark certifications.

=== Dividends ===
Credit unions do not pay a fixed rate of interest on savings balances. Instead, they distribute any trading surplus to members in the form of an annual dividend calculated on average savings or as a rebate of loan interest paid (2% in 2023).

A member of the Association of British Credit Unions Limited, registered under the Industrial and Provident Societies Acts, London Capital Credit Union is authorised by the Prudential Regulation Authority and regulated by the Financial Conduct Authority and PRA. Ultimately, like the banks and building societies, members' savings are protected against business failure by the Financial Services Compensation Scheme.

== See also ==
- Credit unions in the United Kingdom
- British co-operative movement
