= North London Credit Union =

British not-for-profit member-owned financial co-operative

- Founded: 1994
- Type: Industrial and Provident Society
- Location: Enfield, Greater London
- Website: northlondoncreditunion.co.uk

North London Credit Union Limited was a not-for-profit member-owned financial co-operative, based in Enfield Town and operating in the north London boroughs of Enfield, Barnet, Haringey, Waltham Forest and southern Hertfordshire. The credit union had around 1,500 members and managed assets in excess of £3 million. In 2023, it merged with London Capital Credit Union, bringing with it two members of staff.

== History ==
Notable for being one of the first credit unions to lend money to businesses, North London Enterprise Club Credit Union was formed for members of the North London Enterprise Club in 1994. It became North London Chamber and Enterprise Credit Union in association with North London Chamber of Commerce in 1997 and North London Enterprise Credit Union in 2006, before adopting its final name in 2009.

In 2016, the credit union was awarded a grant of £50,000 by the Lloyds Banking Group Credit Union Development Fund to support its capital asset ratio, loan growth and future sustainability.

== Activities ==
A member of the Association of British Credit Unions Limited, registered under the Industrial and Provident Societies Acts, North London Credit Union was authorised by the Prudential Regulation Authority and regulated by the Financial Conduct Authority and PRA. Ultimately, like the banks and building societies, members' savings were protected against business failure by the Financial Services Compensation Scheme.

In 2022, the directors approached the larger, stronger London Capital Credit Union with a view to merger. The transfer of engagements was completed in 2023, ending 29 years of independent trading.

== See also ==
- Credit unions in the United Kingdom
- British co-operative movement
