= Lincolnshire Credit Union =

Credit union in the United Kingdom

- Founded: 2001 (Gainsborough and District 1999)
- Type: Industrial and Provident Society
- Location: City Hall, Beaumont Fee, Lincoln LN1 1DD
- Website: lincscreditunion.org.uk

The Lincolnshire Credit Union Limited is a not-for-profit member-owned financial co-operative, based in Lincoln and operating throughout the county in the English Midlands. In 2011, the credit union had approximately 2,000 adult savers, nearly 500 borrowers and 350 junior savers. LincUp, Alford and District Community Bank and Louth Community Bank are previous trading names of Lincolnshire Credit Union.

As of March 2020, A proposed merger between Lincolnshire Credit Union and Nottingham Credit Union was unveiled, with the proposed merge happening in June 2020.

== History ==
The North Kesteven Credit Union was formed in 2001, adopting its current name in 2004, when the then Financial Services Authority agreed to an expansion of the common bond allowing the credit union to operate within the administrative county of Lincolnshire. Gainsborough and District Credit Union, which had been founded in 1999, transferred engagements in 2007.

In 2009, the board met with the directors of Lincoln Credit Union, which had been serving members in the city of Lincoln since 2001, and agreed that the best interests of the whole Lincolnshire community would be better served by merging the operations of both organisations.

In 2017, the credit union was awarded a seed grant of £18,804 by the Lloyds Banking Group Credit Union Development Fund.

== Activities ==
The members of a credit union are required to share a common bond. In the case of Lincolnshire Credit Union, membership is restricted to people living or working in the county of Lincolnshire in the East Midlands.

A member of the Association of British Credit Unions Limited, registered under the Industrial and Provident Societies Acts, The Lincolnshire Credit Union is authorised by the Prudential Regulation Authority and regulated by the Financial Conduct Authority and PRA. Ultimately, like the banks and building societies, members' savings are protected against business failure by the Financial Services Compensation Scheme.

== See also ==
- Credit unions in the United Kingdom
- Lincolnshire Co-operative
