= Hornsey Co-operative Credit Union =

Credit union in London, England, 1964–2013

- Founded: 1964
- Dissolved: 2013 (transfer of engagements)
- Type: Industrial and Provident Society
- Location: 26 Drylands Road, Hornsey, London N8 9HN

Hornsey (FIA) Co-operative Credit Union Limited was a savings and loans co-operative, established in the Municipal Borough of Hornsey, now part of the London Borough of Haringey, in 1964. One of the earliest credit unions in the United Kingdom, it merged with London Capital Credit Union in 2013.

== History ==
Hornsey Co-operative Credit Union was set up by 10 members of the Ferme Park Baptist church unable to get credit from the banks and who were familiar with credit unions in their native Jamaica, including Bentley Hines, Blair Greaves and Basil Lewis. Originally an informal savings club, it was registered in 1964, 15 years before credit unions gained legal structure in Great Britain under the Credit Unions Act 1979. By the time of its first Annual General Meeting, it had grown to over 100 members.

Separately, Wimbledon Credit Union had been incorporated under the Companies Act 1948 six days earlier, however, Hornsey Co-operative was the first credit union to register under the Industrial and Provident Societies Act 1893 (56 & 57 Vict. c. 39). In 1967, along with other West Indian credit unions, it formed the Credit Union League of Great Britain; this became the Association of British Credit Unions in 1984. Wimbledon Credit Union was wound up in 2005, leaving Hornsey Co-operative as the oldest surviving credit union in the UK.

== Activities ==
Hornsey (FIA) Co-operative Credit Union was authorised by the Prudential Regulation Authority and regulated by the Financial Conduct Authority and PRA. Ultimately, like the banks and building societies, members’ savings were protected against business failure by the Financial Services Compensation Scheme.

In 2012, with its dedicated volunteers and directors getting older, the board approached London Capital Credit Union with a view to merger. The credit union had become semi-dormant, with only one active loan on the books, although it had excellent reserves. In 2013, after 49 years of independent trading, the remaining 250 members of the credit union voted to transfer engagements. In 2014, Elaine Greaves, daughter of one of the founding fathers, was co-opted on to the board of London Capital continuing the family's involvement in the credit union movement.

== See also ==
- Credit unions in the United Kingdom
- British co-operative movement
