= Newsagent's shop =

Shop or person selling newspapers and magazines

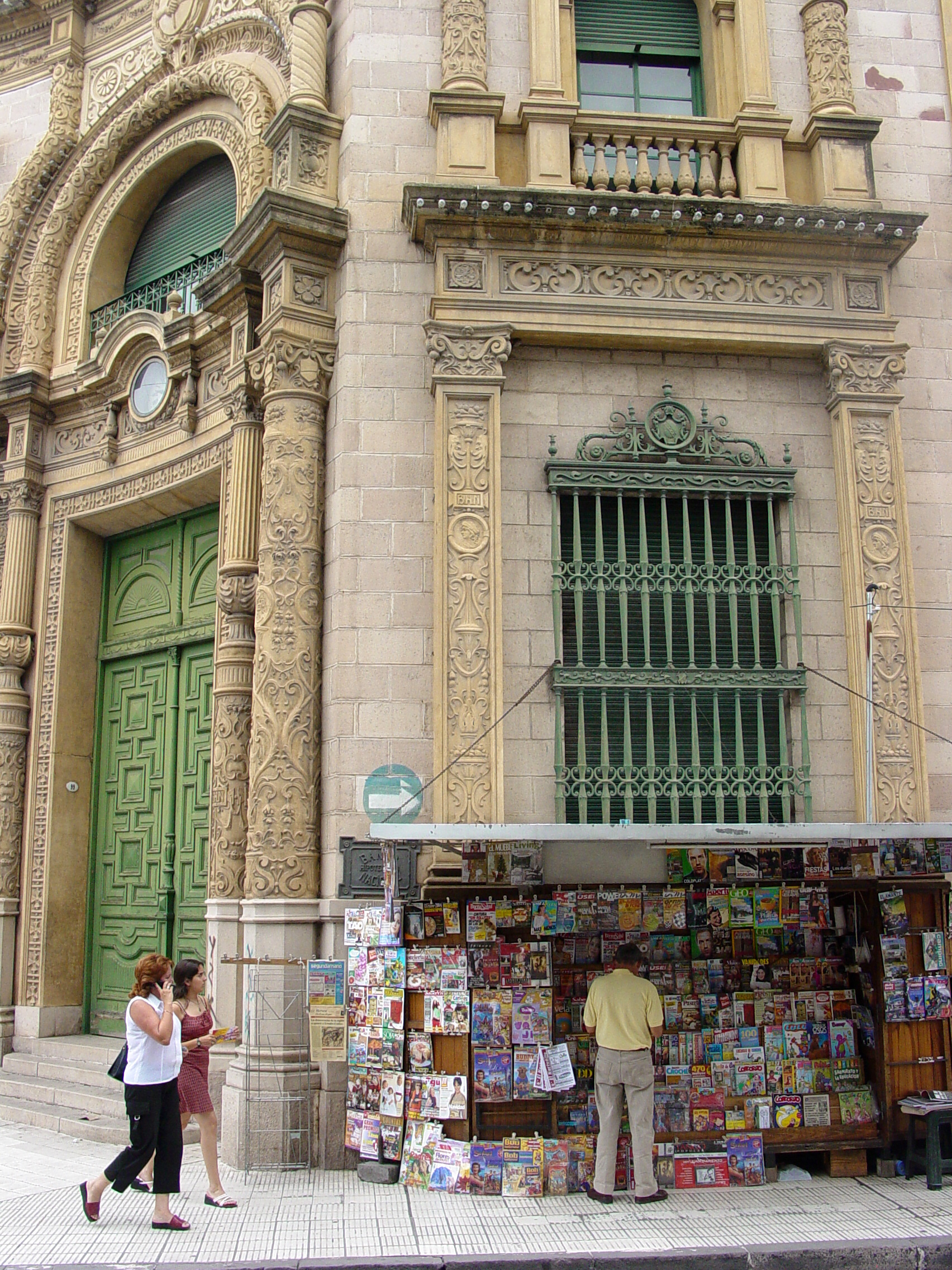
A newsstand in Salta, Argentina, 2009

A newsagent's shop is a small business that sells newspapers, magazines, cigarettes, snacks and often items of local appeal. Newsagents typically operate in busy public places like city streets, railway stations and airports. Racks for newspapers and magazines can also be found within convenience stores, bookstores and supermarkets. The physical establishment can be either freestanding or part of a larger structure (e.g. a shopping mall or a railway station). In Canada and the United States, newsstands are often open stalls in public locations such as streets, or in a transit terminal or station (subway, rail, or airport).

== Terminology ==
It may be simply called a newsagent's or paper shop (British English), newsagency (Australian English) or newsstand (American and Canadian English). In the United Kingdom, Ireland and Australia, these businesses are termed newsagents (or newsagency in Australia).

== By country ==
=== Australia ===
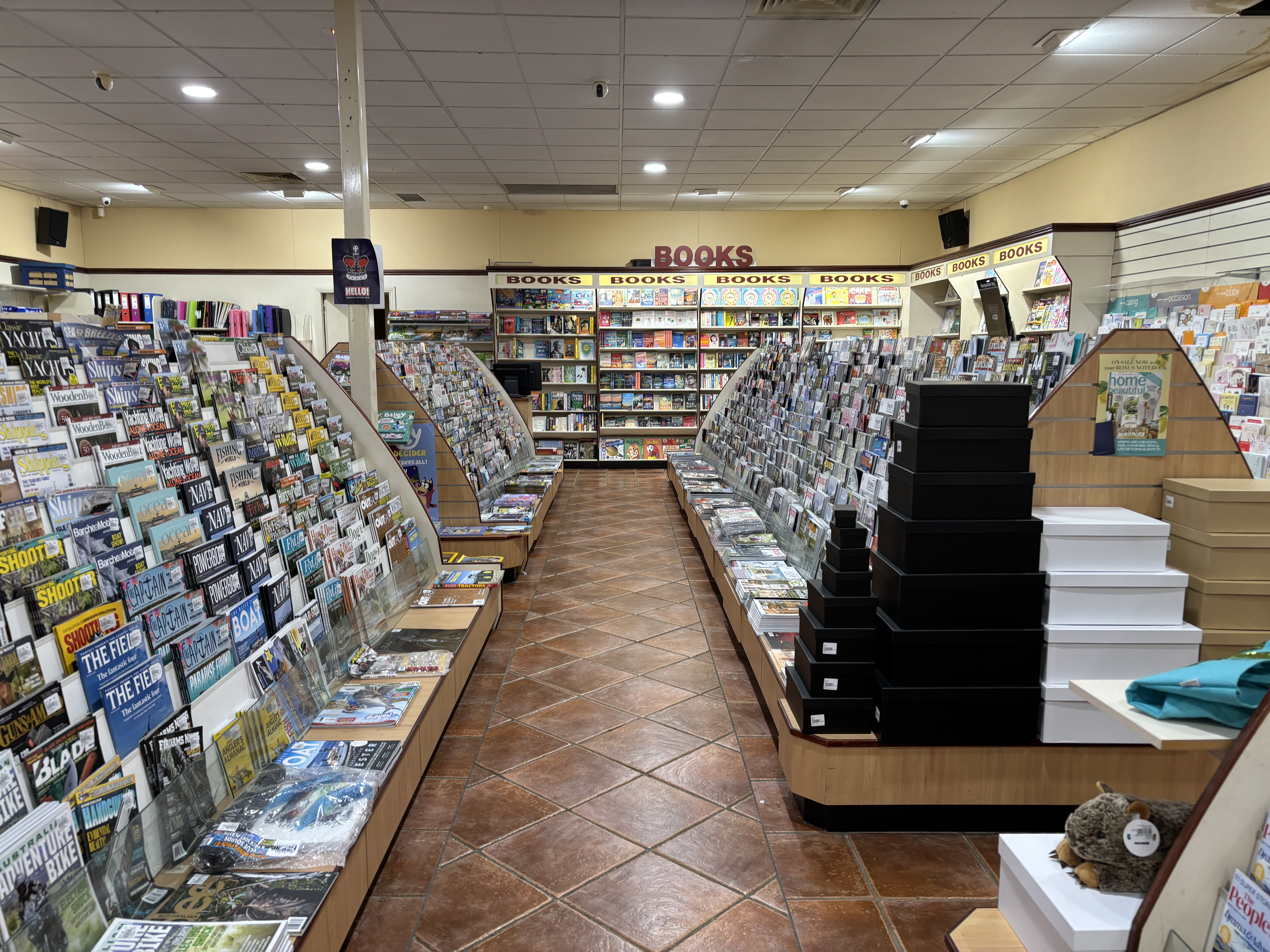
The interior of a newsagency in Canberra, Australia, 2025

A newsagent is the manager of the newspaper department of the shop, often also the owner of a newsagency shop. Newsagencies conduct either a retail business and/or a distribution business. When they first appeared in Australia is unknown; the earliest reference known in Australia is an advertisement in 1855 in Melbourne.

The number of newsagencies in Australia are falling in recent years and this decline is expected to continue. In 2000, there was estimated about 5,000, by 2007/8 there were 4,635 newsagencies, and by 2016/7 there were just 3,150 newsagencies.

==== Retail newsagencies ====
Retail newsagencies primarily offer a comprehensive range of newspapers and magazines, as well as stationery and greeting cards.

==== Distribution newsagencies ====
Distribution newsagencies offer home delivery of a comprehensive range of newspapers and magazines, These can be quite large and sophisticated businesses. If authorised, they are often fully computerized. They often have a territory, which is partly protected by contracts with most of the Australian Newsagents' Federation recognised publishers/distributors. These recognised publishers/distributors include ACP Publishing, News Limited, Fairfax Publications, Rural Press, The West Australian and Australian Provincial Newspapers. These monopolies have been a major source of contention between newsagents and the Australian Consumer Affairs.

=== Brazil ===
In Brazil, newsagents' shops are known as "bancas de jornal" or "bancas de revistas" and are usually family-owned, free-standing kiosks that only deal in periodical publications, telephone cards, bus tickets and the occasional book and cut-price DVD. In suburban areas and villages they are normally housed in a shop selling stationery, tobacco and sweets as well as periodicals.

=== Greece ===
In Greece, newsagents' shops are called periptera (singular: periptero) and they sell newspapers and magazines, but also other goods like beverages (including alcoholic ones), snacks, tobacco; and other kinds of merchandise. Opening times vary. They are typically found on the side of the road in crowded public areas.

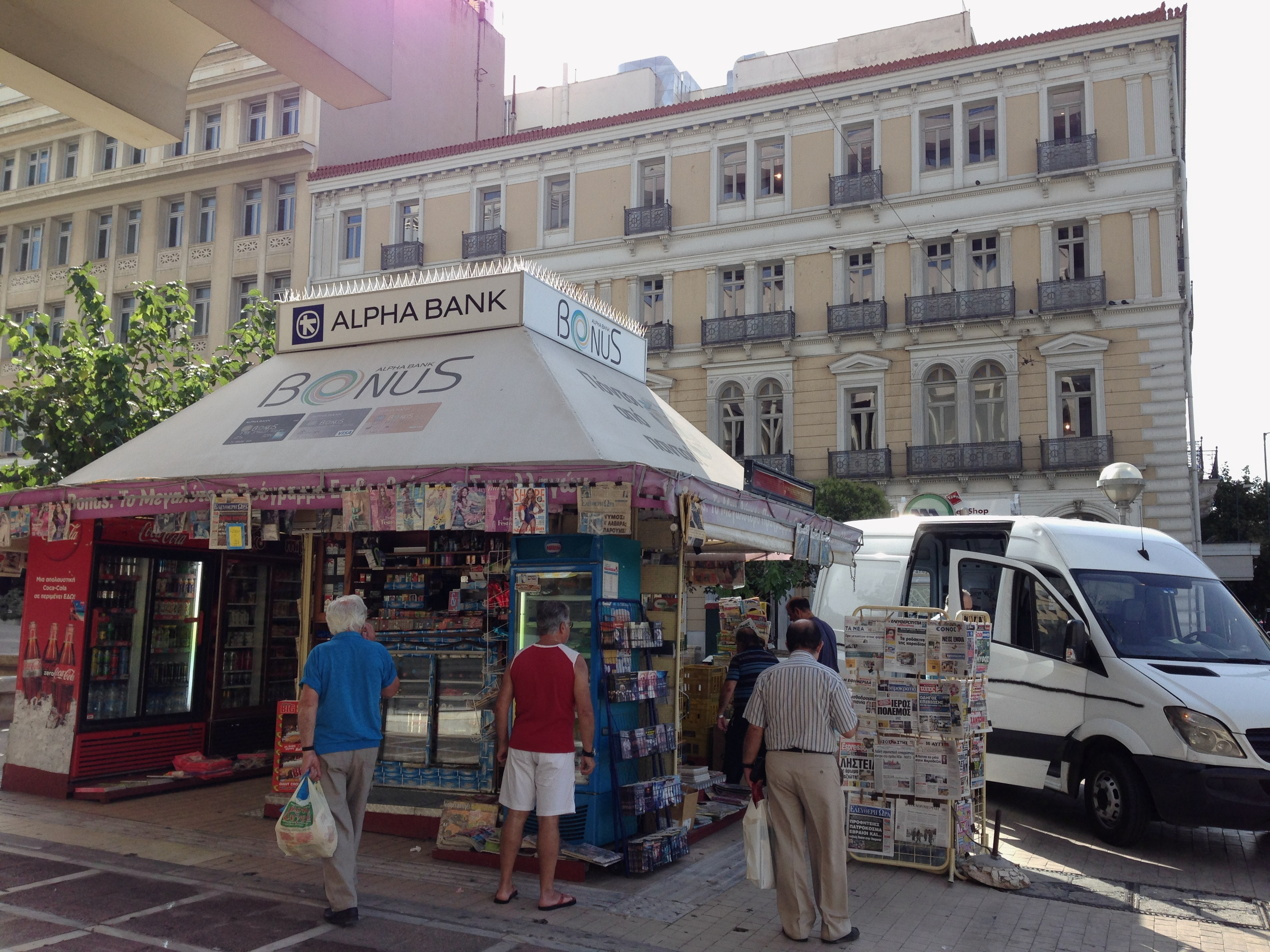
A periptero in Athens, Greece

=== Italy ===
In Italy, newsagents' shops are known as edicola and are usually family-owned, free-standing kiosks that only deal in periodical publications, stickers, bus tickets and the occasional book and cut-price DVD. In suburban areas and villages they are normally housed in a shop selling stationery, tobacco and sweets as well as periodicals.

=== Japan ===
In Japan, newsagents' shops are called kiosks, and are typically found in or around railway or subway stations. In addition to newspapers and magazines, they sell beverages, snack foods, postage stamps, cigarettes, and many other kinds of merchandise. Ekiben boxed lunches can be purchased at larger kiosks in inter-city rail stations.

=== United Kingdom ===
In the United Kingdom, newsagents' shops are small shops selling newspapers as well as magazines, sweets and tobacco. In addition to counter sales, the shops traditionally also deliver newspapers to people's homes. The deliverers, usually children, are said to have a "paper round". Some newsagents also sell provisions and alcoholic beverages. Opening times vary according to the owners' preferences.

Many shops are family-owned. These family-owned shops may carry the branding of a purchasing group or wholesaler group. Alternatively the private owner may chose to do his own purchasing (usually from cash and carries) and carry advertising for a local paper, national news group or soft drink brand externally. Prior to the banning of advertising of tobacco products, this was the most common form of external advertising. The primary organisation looking after the interests of independent newsagents in the UK and Ireland is the National Federation of Retail Newsagents.

Other newsagents are part of national chains such as The Co-op and WHSmith. Mini-marts, off-licences and supermarkets may also act as newsagents.

=== United States ===
Alameda, California

In 1934, John J. Mulvany, Vice President of a Bank of America branch, across the street, donated the materials and labor to build Paul’s Newsstand at the northwest corner of Santa Clara Avenue and Park Street in Alameda, California.

Los Angeles, California

In the late 1940s, at the corner of 1st and Soto streets, in Boyle Heights a newsstand opened and survived.

San Francisco

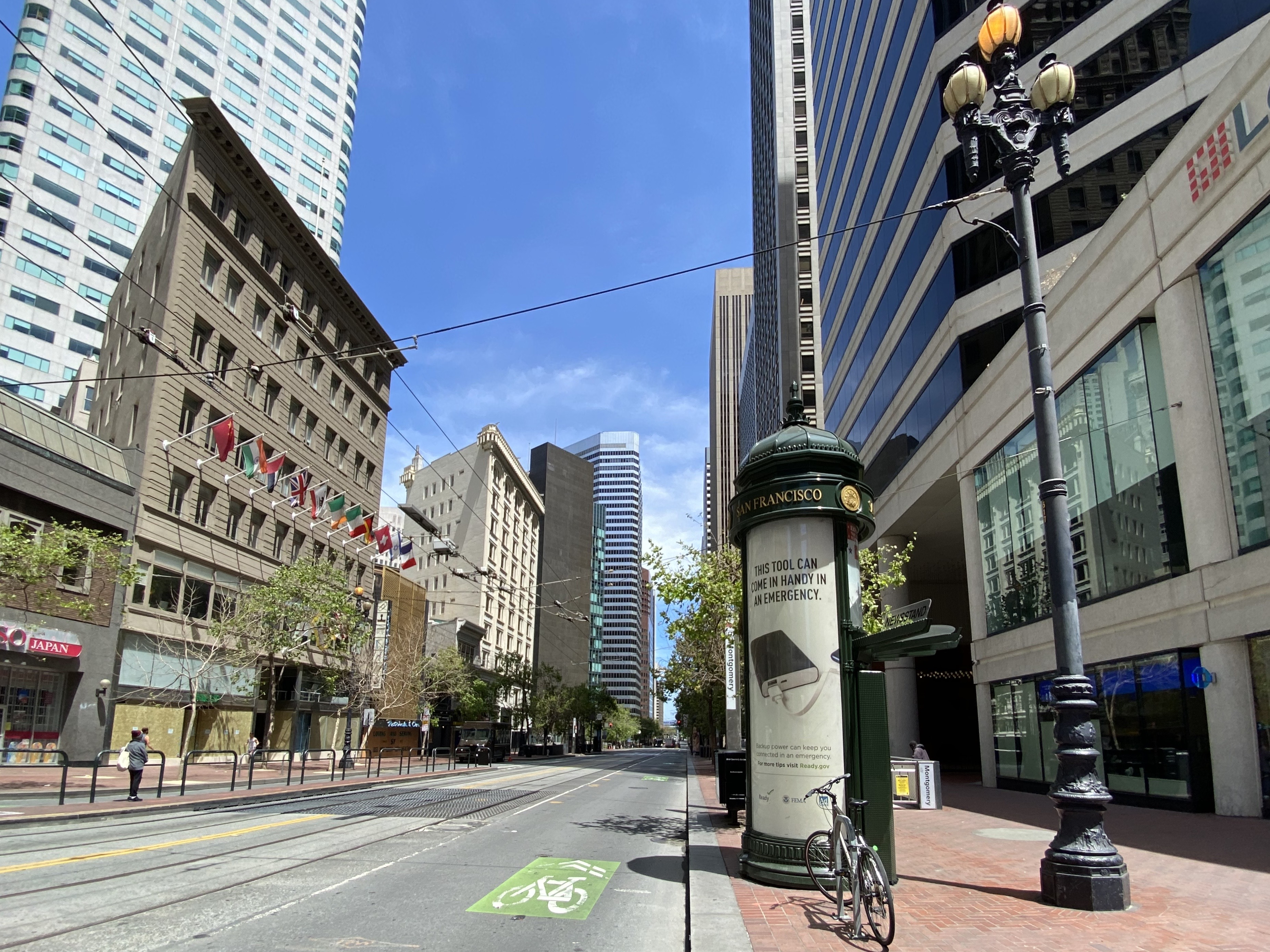
JCDecaux news kiosk, Market St. at Montgomery St., April 27, 2020

JCDecaux installed news kiosks in downtown San Francisco, as part of a contract for advertising displays, toilets and other street furniture, replacing steel beam and aluminium siding newsstands painted beige, telephone pole displays, and plywood shacks painted green. They remain, without news vendors, with a few repurposed for "Free Bike Repair", other printed sales, and continue to display advertisements.

New York City

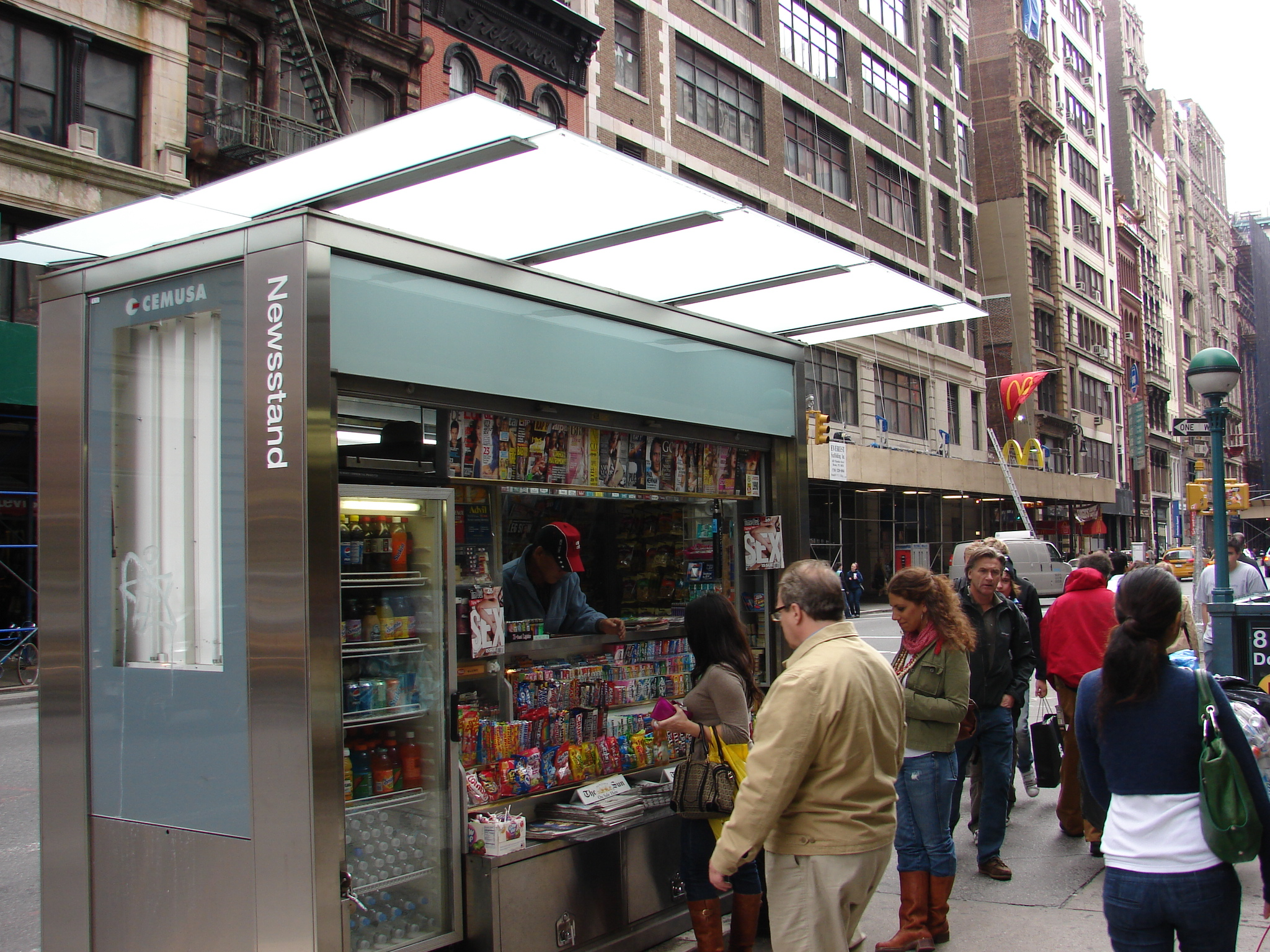
An outdoor newsstand, New York City, October 2008

On street corners in New York City, for instance, newsstands are often shacks constructed of steel beams and aluminium siding or roofing tin; and require a city permit to build and operate. Other New York newsstands are located inside airports, hotels and office buildings – and even beneath street level in underground concourses or on subway platforms. Hudson News, a newsstand brand created in New York City, is operated by retailer the Hudson Group, with more than 500 stores around the world. This brand was created in 1987, and became more popular in the 1990s, during a time when newsstands in commuter terminals were being re-evaluated and reopened to better serve customers and the spaces with the most commuter foot traffic. Prior to this, newsstands caused limited visibility for police officers patrolling the subway stations, as well as impeding crowd movement.

== See also ==
- Digital newsstand
