= Radstock Co-operative Society =

Consumer co-operative based in Somerset

Radstock Co-operative Society Limited
- Formerly: The Radstock Co-operative and Industrial Society, Limited
- Type: Consumer Co-operative
- Industry: Retail, Agriculture
- Founded: May 9, 1868; 158 years ago
- Headquarters: Radstock, Somerset, United Kingdom
- Area served: Somerset, England
- Key people: Don Morris (CEO)
- Revenue: £47.9 million (2020/21)
- Operating income: £745,000 (2020/21)
- Net income: £644,000 (2020/21)
- Total assets: £13.4 million (2015/16)
- Members: 7,000 (2014)
- Number of employees: 369 (2014)
- Website: radstock.coop

Radstock Co-operative Society Limited is a small regional consumer co-operative, which was established in Radstock, Somerset, England in 1868 and in 2023 operated 21 food stores across Somerset, three with post office facilities, alongside a 1,000 acre farm. It is owned and democratically controlled by its customer members, who numbered approximately 7000 in 2014. The society grew from a turnover of £15 million in 2006 to over £35m by 2016, doubling the number of stores over the period. The business has held the Fair Tax Mark since 2016.

In 2016, the society operated a large supermarket in Radstock and eighteen convenience shops in nearby areas. The society also owns Manor Farm at Hardington, a dairy farm which supplies a substantial portion of the organic milk sold through UK Co-operative Stores. It previously owned a Homemaker Furniture store.

In 2020 the society obtained planning permission to replace its Radstock "superstore" with a housing and new store development. The old single-storey building was beyond economical repair, and will be replaced with two three-storey buildings and a public square. In August 2020 the store was moved to temporary premises for the duration of the redevelopment. Demolition of the old building started in November 2022.

The society participates in the British co-operative movement. As well as supplying cheese for national distribution by the Co-operative Retail Trading Group (CRTG) through a milk processor, it obtains food goods from the CRTG. It is a corporate member and shareholder of The Co-operative Group, a national business that is successor to the Co-operative Wholesale Society. In line with many retail co-operatives across the UK, during the late 2000s the society began converting its stores from the 1993 dark blue Co-op cloverleaf branding, to green “The co-operative food” fascias, alongside acquiring stores in Shepton Mallet and Coleford.

== Locations ==
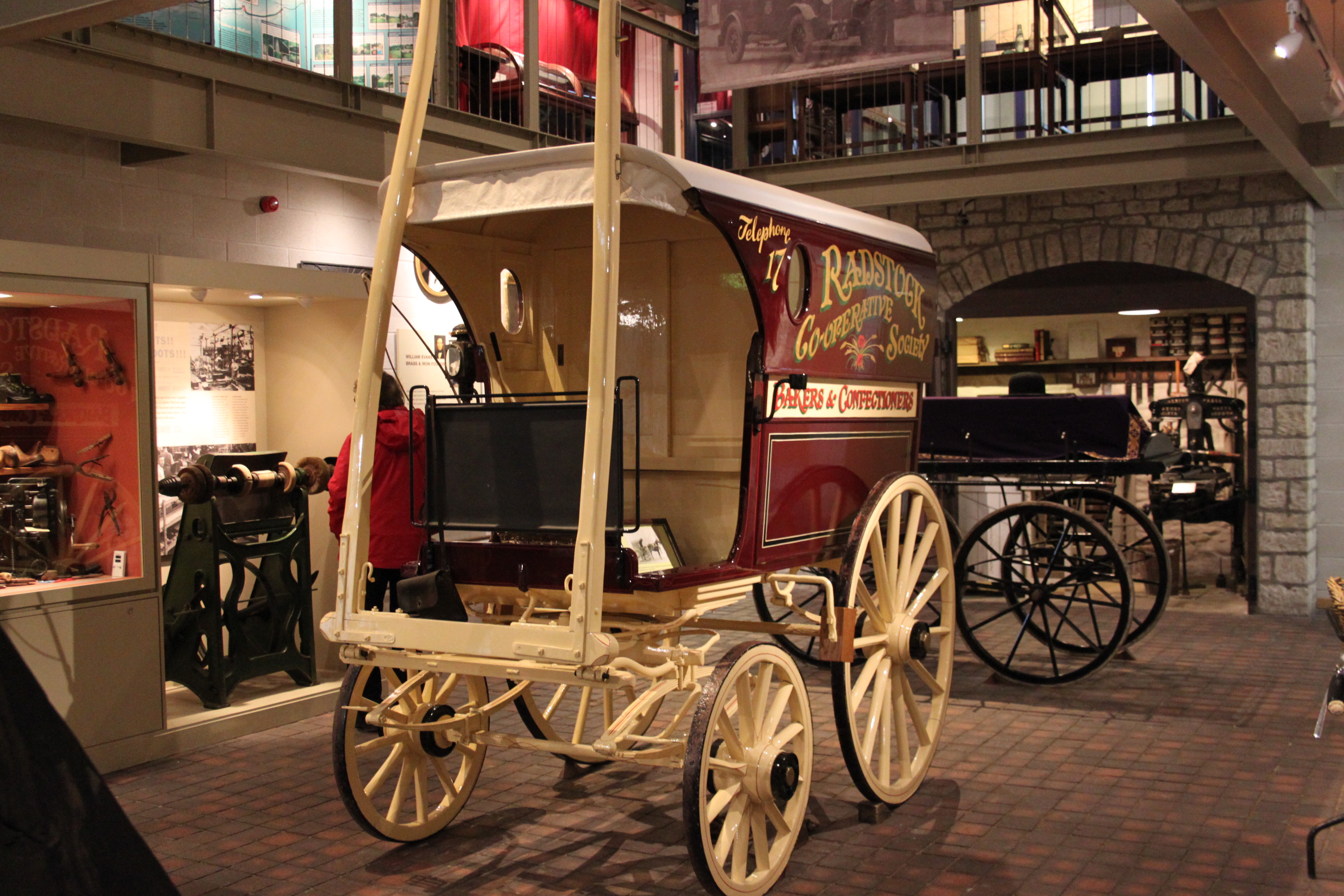
Early delivery wagon of the Radstock Cooperative Society, Taken in Radstock Museum

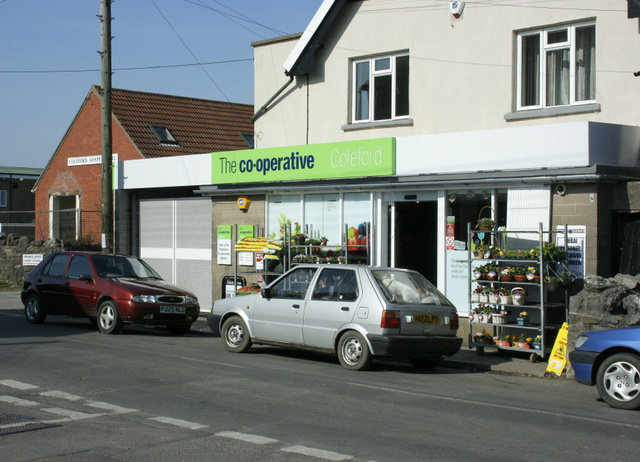
The store in Coleford

- Peasedown St John, 1908
- Timsbury, North Somerset, 1916
- Chilcompton, Somerset, 1919
- Chew Magna, North Somerset, 1924
- Westfield (Elm Tree Avenue), 1940s
- Radstock superstore, 1959 (in redevelopment)
- Shepton Mallet, Somerset, 2008
- Glastonbury, Somerset, 2009
- Coleford, Somerset, 2009 (formerly Crossway Stores)
- Street, Somerset, 2010
- Frome, Somerset, 2011
- Westfield (Fosseway), 2012
- Farrington Gurney, 2013
- Fosseway, 2014
- Frome, Somerset Bath Road, 2015
- Trowbridge, Castle Mead, 2017
- Warminster, Victoria Road, 2017
- Weston-Super-Mare, Milton Road, 2018
- Bridgwater, Paragon Place, 2018
- Haywood Village, Whitney Crescent, 2018
- Highbridge, Tanning Drive, 2020
- Watchet, Liddymore Road, 2023
- Wincanton, Dykes Way, 2025

== See also ==
- British co-operative movement
- Credit unions in the United Kingdom
