= National Federation of Retail Newsagents =

Employers' association

The Federation of Independent Retailers (formally NFFRN)
- Abbreviation: The Fed
- Formation: 1919
- Legal status: Employers Association
- Location: Bede House, Belmont Business Park, Belmont, Durham, DH1 1TW
- Region served: United Kingdom and Ireland
- Members: 15,000 members operating 10,000 stores
- Website: www.thefedonline.com

The National Federation of Retail Newsagents (NFRN) is an employers' association representing more than 10,000 stores across the United Kingdom and Ireland. Its roots go back to the latter part of the nineteenth century.

== History ==
The roots of the NFRN can be traced back to late nineteenth century when local groups across the north of England, formed to bring together retailers in locations such as Blackburn, Accrington and Burnley. The Retail Newsagents and Booksellers Union was formed in 1891 at the Congregational Memorial Hall, Farringdon Street. The Union had branches in Edinburgh, Glasgow, Brighton and Reading but broke up amid infighting in 1901. Whilst one union was faltering, another, the Northern Counties Union, was formed in Manchester. The NCU is the first organisation who can claim unbroken descendants to today. A third union, the National Union, was founded in 1902 but was dissolved in 1915.

The NCU was strengthened in 1911 when a conference in Leeds agreed its merger with the United Kingdom Federation, which had been formed in White City, London, in 1908. Other local federations from across the north of the country joined the newly enlarged organization.

While the movement towards one national organization may have been welcomed by many, progress was not to be smooth as two years later, another organization, the London and Provincial Newsagents, was formed. More London and southern based than the NCU, the LPN nether the less built a significant membership.

With the formation of the Scottish Federation in 1915, the three organizations were to merge in the early interwar years to work to represent their members. It was in the aftermath of the First World War that Alexander MacLaren, a member of a Glasgow newsagents family contacted representatives of the various organizations with the view to forming a national organization, an objective he had worked towards while recovering from serious injuries he sustained during the war.

The result was the National Unity Conference held in Birmingham in 1918. This conference agreed the formation of the National Joint Board of Retailers whose role was to lay the ground work for a new organization. Alongside Maclaren, who acted as Secretary, was F. A. Ratcliffe, of the LPC, who took the role of chairman.

On the 9 and 10 July 1919, at a conference in Leicester, the National Federation of Retail Newsagents, Booksellers and Stationers was formed.

== Structure ==
National Council is the body that runs the NFRN between Annual Conferences. It meets four times a year to debate key issues and to decide national policy. National Council comprises representatives from all 15 NFRN Districts. These National Councillors are elected by members of the district councils during the AGM's.

The National Executive Committee meets every month to implement the decisions from National Council and from Annual Conference. It comprises three elected national officers—National President, National Vice President, National Deputy Vice President – the Immediate Past President and six National Council members who are voted onto the committee during Annual Conference. The National President chairs the NEC, National Council meetings and Annual Conference. They act as an ambassador for the NFRN, officially visiting all NFRN Districts across the United Kingdom and Ireland, attending key industry events on behalf of and to represent members, as well as meeting with senior executives from the newspaper and magazine industry. The current National President is Narinder Randhawa since October 2021.

=== Key people ===
==== Past national presidents ====
Year	President	Branch
2022–present	Jason Birks	County Durham
2021–2022	Narinder Randhawa	West Midlands
2019–2021	Stuart Reddish	Sheffield
2018–19	Mike Mitchelson	Carlisle & Cumbria
2017–18	Linda Sood	Portsmouth
2016–17	Ray Monelle	Weston Super Mare
2015–16	Ralph Patel	Croydon
2014–15	Martin Brown	Leeds
2013–14	Colin Fletcher	Southampton
2012–13	Alan Smith	Derby
2011–12	Kieran McDonell	Newcastle
2010–11	Parminder Singh	Birmingham
2009–10	Suleman Khonat	Blackburn
2008–09	Naresh Purohit	Dartford
2007–08	Colin Finch	South Wales
2006–07	Sam Whiteside	North Wales
2005–06	Mehendra Jadeja	London
2004–05	Peter Wagg	London
2003–04	David Kirwin	Man
2002–03	Colin Finch	South Wales
2001–02	Eddie Clements	Portrush
2000–01	Margaret Adams	Perth
1999–00	Alan Dryden	Salford
1998–99	T Egginton	Mansfield
1997–98	R Rushbrook	Dartford
1996–97	R Turnbull	Hull
1995–96	O L Church	Great Yarmouth
1994–95	Mike Mitchelson	Carlisle
1993–94	P A Seaman	Bristol
1992–93	A Scott	Shropshire
1991–92	J Sharman	Bournemouth
1990–91	T R Pigg	Isle of Thanet

== Campaigns ==
In recent years, the NFRN has stepped up its campaign to reduce retail crime following a sharp rise in recorded incidents of shop theft, violence and abuse in store, criminal damage, and armed robberies.

The NFRN is the secretariat of the All Party Parliamentary Group (APPG) on Retail Crime, chaired by Steve McCabe MP. The purpose of the retail crime group is to raise awareness of retail crime and the impact it has on retailers and shop workers.

In May 2016, following the Police and Crime Commissioner (PCC) elections, NFRN Public Affairs began to meet with newly elected Commissioners from across England and Wales to encourage them to create a business crime strategy which aims at reducing retail crime and increasing response times to retail crime incidents. In August 2016, following a series of Freedom of Information requests, Retail Newsagent Magazine reported that the NFRN investigation revealed a "postcode lottery" for police response times.

The NFRN is stepping up efforts in showing the news industry that Enough's Enough when it comes to unfair carriage charges and that an independent review is vital to stop more shops closing or newsagents deserting the news category.

== NFRN Credit Union ==
NFRN Credit Union Limited is a savings and loans co-operative established for NFRN members and their employees in 2006. A member of the Association of British Credit Unions Limited, it is authorised by the Prudential Regulation Authority and regulated by the Financial Conduct Authority and the PRA. Ultimately, like the banks and building societies, members’ savings are protected against business failure by the Financial Services Compensation Scheme.

== See also ==
- Credit unions in the United Kingdom
