= Basil Lewis =

British community leader, politician, and businessman (1927–2020)

Cllr Basil Lewis OBE

Councillor for Haringey Borough Council (Crouch End Ward)
- In office 4 May 1978 – 6 May 1982 Serving with Brian Smith and Stephen Ayres
- Preceded by: W. A. Blackburne
- Succeeded by: Heather Thorpe

Councillor for Haringey Borough Council (Stroud Green Ward)
- In office 9 May 1968 – 4 May 1978 Serving with J. Lotery and G. H. Stansall
- Preceded by: C. Hannington
- Succeeded by: ward abolished

Personal details
- Born: Basil Lewis; 24 December 1927 Clarendon, Jamaica
- Died: 26 April 2020
- Party: Conservative
- Relatives: Daniel Lewis

Basil Lewis OBE (1927-2020) was a British community leader, politician and businessman. He was the first black councillor elected in the London Borough of Haringey and one of the first black councillors elected anywhere in the United Kingdom.

Basil Lewis was an active community organiser who helped establish a series of local associations in north London, including the Hornsey Co-operative Credit Union (which became one of the longest-running credit unions in Britain), the North London West Indian Association, and the Anglo-West Indian Conservative Society. During his time as a councillor, he helped found Haringey Council's Community Relations Council.

He was awarded an OBE by Queen Elizabeth II in the 1982 Birthday Honours for services to politics and the community, recognising his efforts to raise political participation and build community relations.

== Personal life ==
Basil Lewis was born in Clarendon, Jamaica in 1927. In 1954, Basil left Jamaica for Britain, settling in Hornsey in North London. He started working as a telephone engineer for Standard Telephones and Cables Ltd (later Nortel), before going on to set up his own record shop and then a travel agency Sunshine Travel, which arranged holidays to the Caribbean.

He joined the Union Church, close to where he lived on Drylands Road in Hornsey. Alongside around a dozen church members he helped set up a savings-and-loans club for the local community, designed to help those who could not get a bank loan to borrow money to start businesses or buy a home. Caribbean migrants at the time often found that the interest rates offered and deposits required by banks were unaffordable. On 7 April 1964 the club was formally established as the Hornsey Cooperative Credit Union. Less than a year later it had more than one hundred members.

== Political life ==
Basil Lewis was first elected in 1968 as a Conservative councillor for Stroud Green. He served the ward for ten years. Following boundary changes in 1978, he stood in the newly expanded Crouch End ward, serving until 1982.

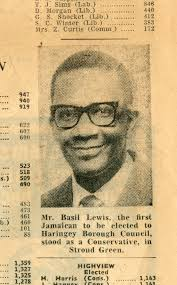
Clipping from the Hornsey Journal, 17 May 1968 (from Bruce Castle Museum collection)

On his election in 1968, Councillor Basil Lewis told local newspaper The Hornsey Journal "I am convinced that the electors in Stroud Green have proved a great example, which may go down in history. Your decision to elect me as one of your ward representatives I accept as a vote of confidence. I pledge myself to serve you to the best of my ability and I will always be ready to assist you and befriend you."

As a councillor, he helped form Haringey's Community Relations Council, Race Equalities Committee and the Ferne Park Housing Association.
