= Stockwell Skatepark =

Concrete skatepark in South London, England

Coordinates: 51.46641°N 0.11596°W

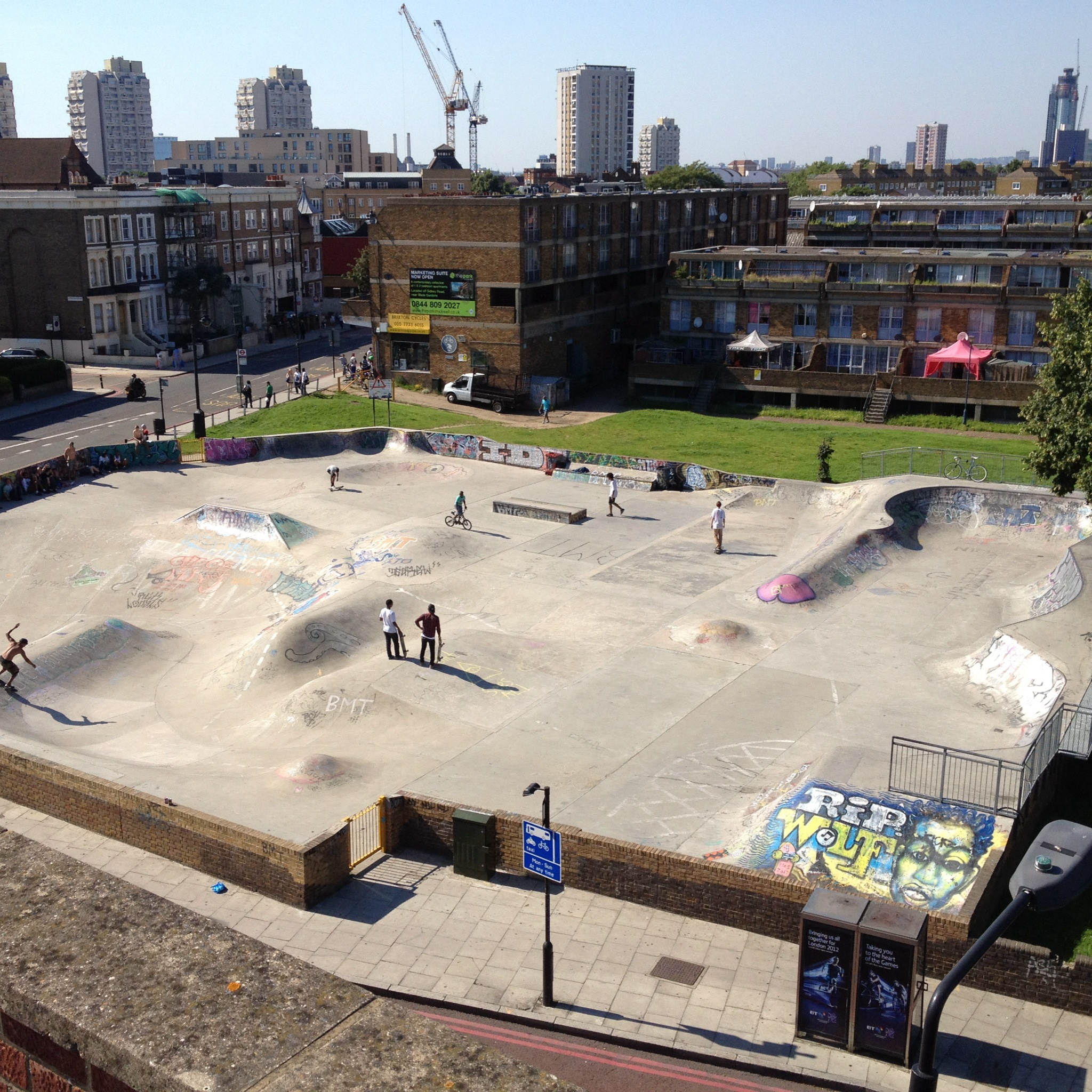
The skatepark viewed from a roof across the road, taken on 24 July 2012

Stockwell Skatepark, also known as "Brixton Bowls" or "Brixton Beach", is a concrete skatepark situated on the corner of Stockwell Park Walk and Stockwell Road in the borough of Lambeth in South London. Construction of the park was funded by the Lambeth Borough Council in 1978 and it has been used since then by skateboarders, BMXers, rollerskaters, and assorted other self-propelled wheeled vehicle practitioners. The park is unsupervised and free to use at all hours, and has remained consistently popular throughout its life, both with locals and with visitors from across the world.

== History ==
Prior to the park's construction, the site was home to Brixton Tabernacle Baptist Church, which has since been relocated to a new brick building nearby on Stockwell Road, opposite Brixton Academy.

The park was built in 1978 by skatepark builder Lorne Edwards. In the late-1990s, the council overlaid the original by then very rough grey surface with a smoother red skin of concrete. In September 2005 that overlay was seriously deteriorated and the park was resurfaced again in grey concrete, this time removing that red surface first. This new surface soon cracked though, and became dangerous in certain places. Users of the park successfully campaigned for a further resurfacing. This was carried out between September 2007 and October 2008. In addition to the new surface, a number of new features were also added during the redevelopment, including a 6-foot bowl end with coping in the north-east corner of the park, previously an empty space. In 2022, the skatepark builders Betongpark resurfaced and updated most of the skatepark, returning the newer parts of it to the red colour of the 1990s and 2000s, and adding various features.

The park has been supported since 2002 by Brixton Cycles, a bike and skate shop which was located next to the park until 2015. The shop has now relocated slightly further north on Brixton Road. Brixton's Baddest skate shop is also nearby on Stockwell Road.

The park is overseen by the Friends of Stockwell Skatepark user group. It is registered as an Asset of Community Value with Lambeth Borough Council.

== Transport links ==
- London Bus Routes 2, 196, 322, 333, 345 and Night Bus Route N2
- London Underground: Brixton Station (Victoria Line)
- National Rail: Brixton Station (Southeastern)
