= Brixton Cycles =

Workers co-operative bike shop in Brixton, United Kingdom

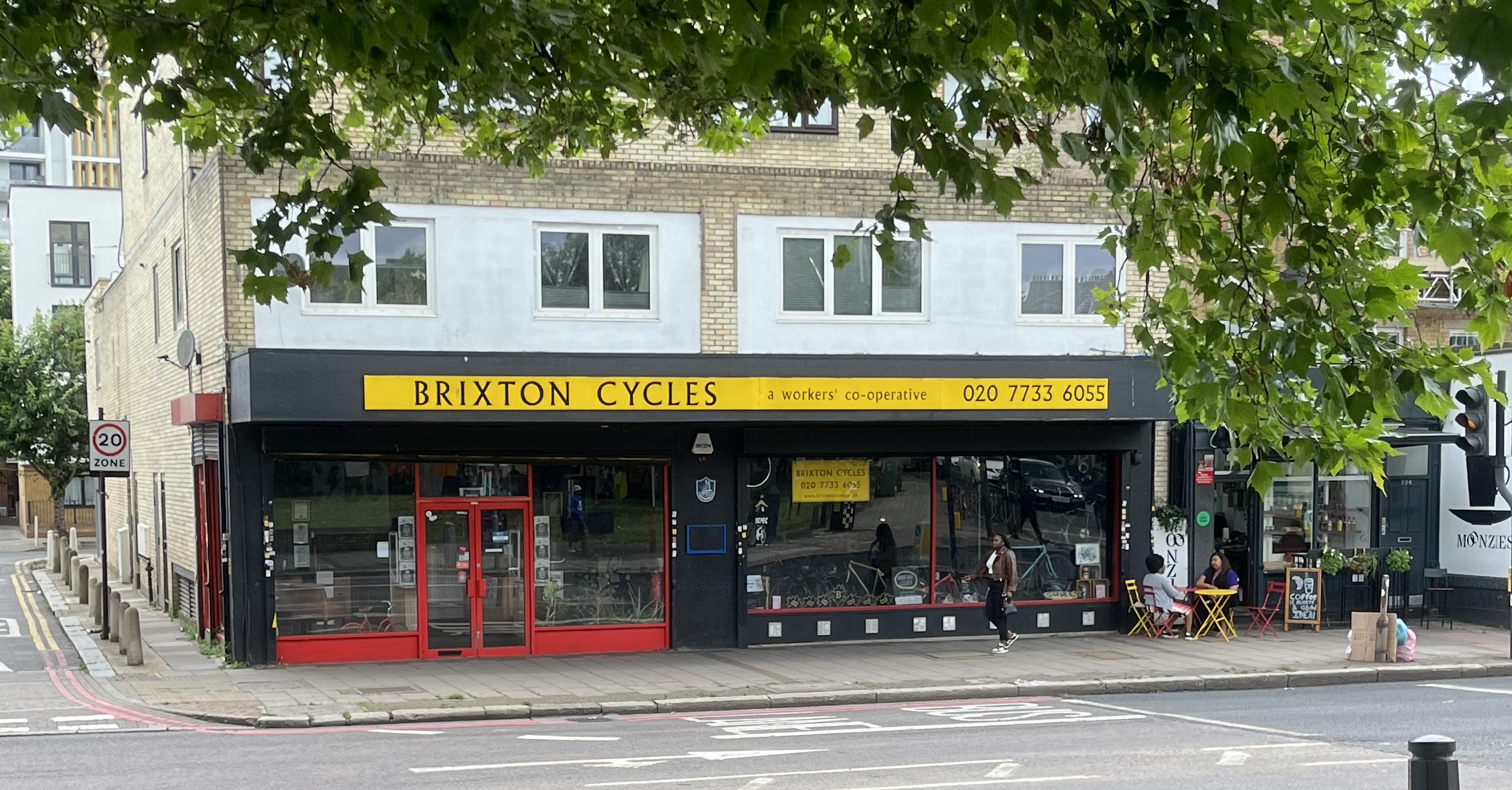
- Brixton Cycles at 296-298 Brixton Road, London.
- Company type: Worker Cooperative
- Industry: Bicycle sales
- Founded: 1983; 43 years ago in Brixton, London, UK. Closed April 2025.
- Headquarters: London
- Services: Bicycle sales, accessories sales, repair, servicing, workshop
- Website: http://brixtoncycles.co.uk

Brixton Cycles was a workers co-operative bike shop in Brixton in the London borough of Lambeth, United Kingdom. It was established in 1983 and closed in April 2025.

Its formation was part of an increasing trend in the 1970s and 1980s of a new cycling shops co-op movement across the United Kingdom. Brixton Cycles being directly inspired by the Edinburgh Bicycle co-op.

The founders who were keen long distance cyclists apparently germinated the idea for the shop on a long ride from Lands end to John O'Groats.

As well as selling products and fixing bike in store the co-op also ran an online shop.

== History ==
Coldharbour Lane 1983 - 2001

The shop first opened in a small space in 433 before moving to 435-437 Coldharbour Lane two years after the Brixton Uprising, at a point that many other businesses had left the area. A founding intention was to make a positive social impact in the area following the uprising.

Early brands sold by the shop at this time included Specialized, Bicycle Chain, Marin and Kona. Local wheelmaker Sam the wheels was an early customer.

Stockwell Road 2001 - 2016

The shop moved to 145 Stockwell Road in May 2001, sitting alongside Stockwell Skatepark the shop supported the local skating and BMX community who used the park.

The shop saw a boom in 2009 when demand for hybrid/commuter bikes outstripped availability. In 2010 police officers who asked the shop to fix their bikes, left multiple bills unpaid. In 2011 the shop saw a big increase in sales of bike tools as shoppers were moving towards building their own bikes.

In 2014 the shop won the award for Best Small Retailer at the London Cycling Awards.

The gentrification of Brixton in this era saw a rise in development, with the estate containing the Stockwell Road shop marked for demolition. Brixton Cycles quickly made a move to crowdfund to afford looking for a new shop premises. The community support of getting Brixton Cycles to a new premises became part of the wider Reclaim Brixton anti-gentrification activism at the time.

Brixton Road 2016 - 2025

With the shop rent tripling with the move to the Brixton Road shop, it at times it became hard for the co-op to stay afloat and open.

With an increase of requests for bike building and repairs the shop changed its layout to double the size of the workshop.

In 2019 the shop was nominated as one of the best bike shops in London by The Londonist with a testimonial supplied by customer and actor Michael Smiley.

In the 2020 COVID-19 lockdown, bicycle shops were quickly deemed essential businesses and with an increase in cycling the shop saw a large surge in orders for bicycles and repairs. Priority services were provided for NHS staff working during the pandemic.

In 2024 comedian and shop regular Chris Morris took to social media to promote the shop's crowdfunding campaign making up funds from a powercut.

Closure, 2025

The Co-op closed its doors in April 2025 and the store was listed for sale. It had earlier launched a crowdfunding campaign to raise £30,000 to avoid closure. Announcements appeared on Facebook and in the cycling press. "We gave it everything. For years, we have been at the coalface, all the while trying to keep cycling accessible in a city that doesn’t always make it easy. But the truth is, between rising costs, a brutal economic climate, and a million other small battles, we just couldn’t make it work anymore. And while we never wanted to let anyone down, sometimes love and hustle just aren’t enough."

== Business structure ==
As a workers co-operative staff were equal owners of the company and were paid an equal hourly wage. Decisions were made by consensus at the business' monthly meeting. At times of financial crisis, staff delayed paying themselves or had to work on alternative models.

All staff worked in the shop, stockroom and as mechanics in the workshop, so expertise was spread out and shared.

== Equality and inclusion ==
The shop had a good representation of women, published author of Bicycle maintenance books Mel Allwood once being a member of staff and director of the co-op.

The shop recognised its community connection, history and support as part of its success of survival.

Workshops took place for gender diverse and LGBTQ+ cyclists to learn basic bicycle maintenance and an event in 2023 celebrated Black cyclists and their involvement in the shop.

== Stock and services ==
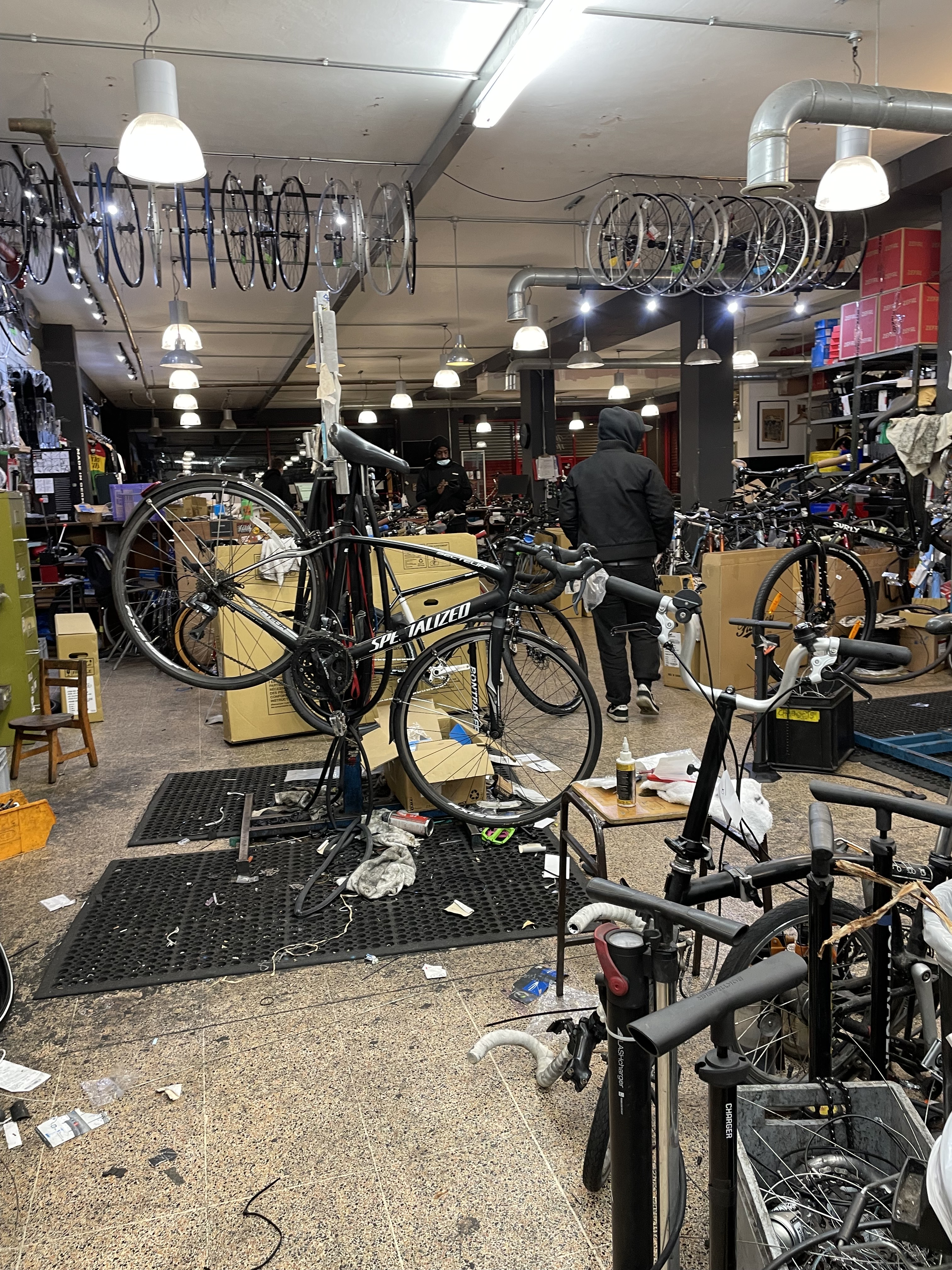
Brixton Cycles workshop

The shop specialised in bikes from Trek and Specialized amongst others.

The advent of online shopping had a negative impact on the shop, with online shops without overheads such as rent being able to offer lower prices. Also the shop has felt they have been subject to showrooming.

The shop offered discounts for NHS staff and London Cycling Campaign members. It also accepted the Brixton pound, a local currency.

The shop's branding utilized AC/DC inspired imagery for merchandising and bright yellow and black exterior signage.

== Cycling Club ==
Brixton Cycles hosted the Brixton Cycles Club - a social club for cyclists with over 180 members in south London. Their ethos is "based on the principles of the co-operative movement". It has a strong focus on inclusion of Black cyclists, with the club jersey being in the Pan-African colours of red, green and gold.

The club held events such as the Beastway series, which had participants including Grayson Perry as well as regular madison events at Herne Hill Velodrome.
