= Lincolnshire Co-operative Challenge =

Former British business education initiative

The Lincolnshire Co-operative Challenge was an English joint competition run by Lincolnshire Co-operative and the Lincolnshire & Rutland Education Business Partnership to promote fairtrade and enterprise within schools. The competition was open to schools in Lincolnshire, North Nottinghamshire and Rutland.

The first and second rounds of the competition took place within the participating schools where finalists were selected to go to the final which took place at the Jackson Theatre, University of Lincoln. The prizes varied between years and were donated by the competition sponsors which include the Lincolnshire Co-operative, Starbucks, The Body Shop and from 2007 Marks & Spencer.

== Winners ==
2005 Friday 10 June

Position	School
1st	St. George's College of Technology, Sleaford

2006 Friday 9 June

Position	School	Prize
1st	Queen Elizabeth's Grammar School, Alford	Ipod Nano
2nd	Uppingham Community College, Uppingham, (Rutland)	Ipod Shuffle
3rd	Carre's Grammar School, Sleaford	MP3 Player

2007 Friday 8 June

Position	School	Prize
1st	Robert Manning Technology College, Bourne	Sony PSP
2nd	Casterton Business and Enterprise College, Great Casterton (Rutland)	DVD Player
3rd	Queen Elizabeth's Grammar School, Alford	Digital Camera

2008 Friday 6 June

Position	School	Prize
1st	Yarborough School, Lincoln	Sony PSP
2nd	Branston Community College	DVD Player
3rd	Queen Elizabeth's Grammar School, Alford	Digital Camera

2009 Friday 12 June

Position	School	Prize
1st	Branston Community College	Sony PSP
2nd	Uppingham Community College, Uppingham	DVD Player
3rd	Vale of Catmose College	Digital Camera

== Number of times in the Top 3 ==
School	Times in Top 3
Queen Elizabeth's Grammar School, Alford	3 (2006, 2007, 2008)
Branston Community College, Branston	2 (2008, 2009)
Uppingham Community College, Uppingham	2 (2006, 2009)
Vale of Catmose College, Oakham	1 (2009)
Yarborough School, Lincoln	1 (2008)
Casterton Community College, Stamford	1 (2007)
Robert Manning Technology College, Bourne	1 (2007)
Carres Grammar School, Sleaford	1 (2006)

Note: There was no Top 3 in 2005
