= Coniston Co-operative Society =

Consumer co-operative in Cumbria, England

Coniston Co-operative Society Limited
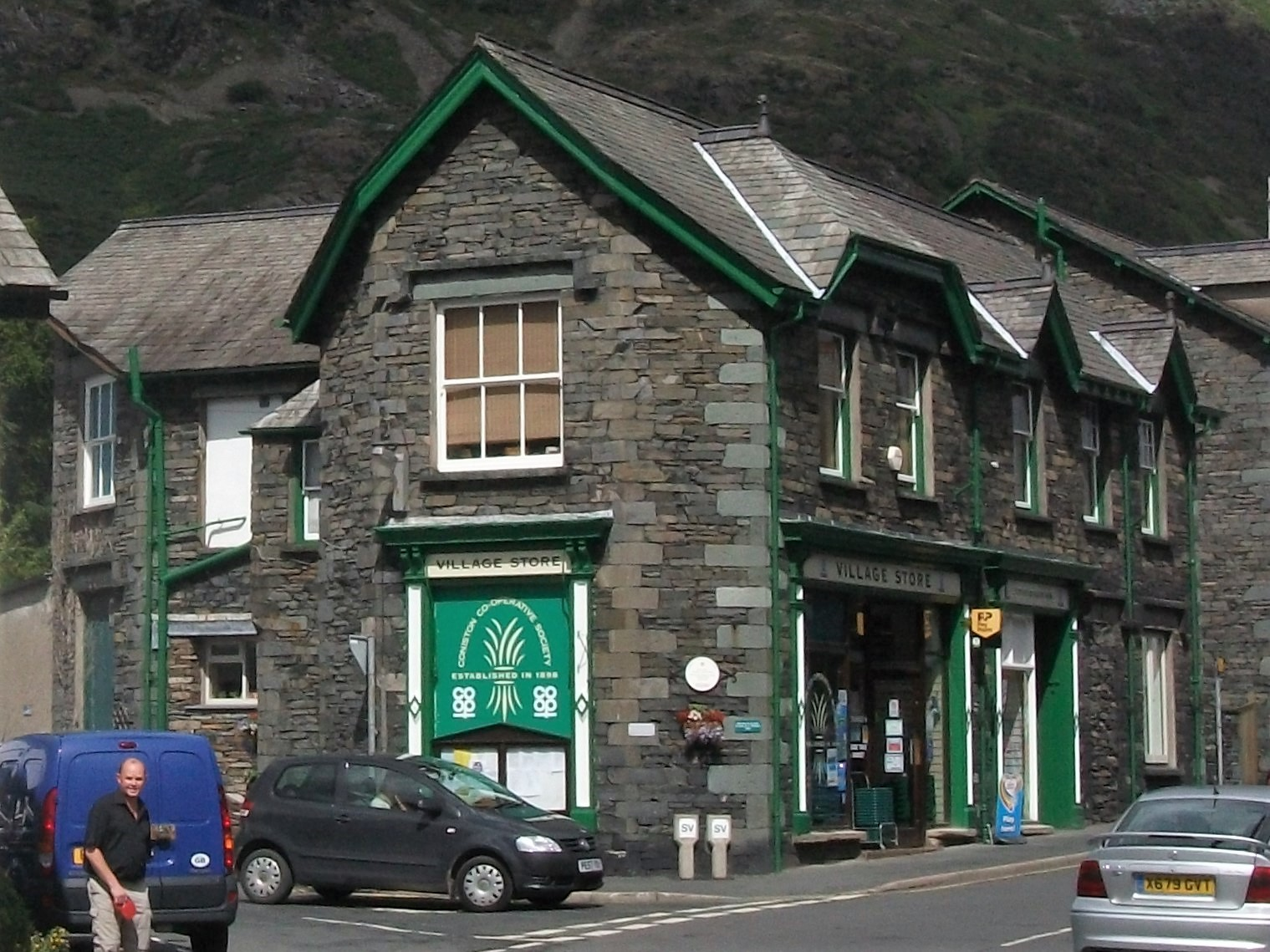
- Formerly: Sawrey Co-operative Society
- Company type: Consumer co-operative
- Founded: 1875; 151 years ago
- Area served: Coniston, Cumbria
- Revenue: £0.8m (2018)
- Total assets: £1.3m (2018)
- Members: 735 (2018)

Coniston Co-operative Society is a small consumer co-operative in Furness, Cumbria, England. It is one of the few retail societies operating a single village store to remain independent.

Founded as Sawrey Co-operative Society in 1875, a branch was opened in nearby Coniston in 1898. The present name was adopted when the Far Sawrey store ceased trading in 1905.

Coniston Co-op is a registered society, democratically controlled by its members. It is a member of Co-operatives UK, The Co-operative Group and the Federal Retail and Trading Services buying group.

== See also ==
- British co-operative movement
