= Lincolnshire Co-operative =

Co-operative retailer in the UK

Lincolnshire Co-operative Limited
- Trade name: Lincolnshire Co-op
- Type: Consumer Co-operative
- Industry: Retail
- Founded: 19 August 1861; 165 years ago
- Headquarters: Stanley Bett House; 15-23 Tentercroft Street; Lincoln LN5 7DB
- Key people: David Cowell: Chair, Jane Moate: President, Alison Hands: Chief Executive
- Services: Food Stores, Pharmacy, Funeral Services, Florist, Travel Agent, Bakery, Coffee Shop, Post Office, Property Services
- Revenue: ▲£375.6m (23/24)
- Members: 288,984 (23/24)
- Number of employees: 2,838 (23/24)
- Website: lincolnshire.coop

Lincolnshire Co-operative Limited, trading as Lincolnshire Co-op, is an independent consumer co-operative which operates in Lincolnshire, and surrounding counties. The society has over 220 outlets with its principal trading activity being its food stores, funeral homes, florist and crematorium, travel agencies, post offices and pharmacies. The Society is owned by over 288,000 members holding Lincolnshire Co-op dividend cards, equal to approximately one quarter of the population of Greater Lincolnshire. The society also owns Gadsby's bakery which is based in Southwell, Nottinghamshire.

As a co-operative, it divides all its profits within its members. Ways of doing this include paying dividend and a dividend bonus at the end of the year, investing in new and improved services and supporting community groups and charities. Since Lincolnshire County Council closed a number of libraries across the county, Lincolnshire Co-op has operated three libraries to support communities.

In the last full year of trading, 2023/24, Lincolnshire Co-op's turnover was £375.6m and a trading surplus of £10.8m, while its society membership was 288,984.

== About ==
Community Champions
In 2013, the Society set up the Community Champions scheme that sees every member linked to a good cause near to where they live. Every time they shop with the Society, a donation goes to their linked good cause. Community Champions change every six months and reflect a different community need. Donations have included over £200,000 for 262 local good causes and charities in April 2025 and £300,000 for local breakfast clubs in October 2024.

Investors in People
Lincolnshire Co-op achieved Investors in People Platinum Investors In People – a prestigious title shared by only two per cent of IIP employers.

To help staff develop, employees can undertake a Foundation Degree in Business Management. The two year qualification was designed specifically for Lincolnshire Co-op by the University of Lincoln and is delivered by trainers from the Society and academics from the University.

== History ==
Lincolnshire Co-operative was founded as Lincoln Co-operative Society in 1861, inspired by Gainsborough joiner Thomas Parker.

Trading began at 1 Napoleon Place, Lincoln, in September 1861. By the end of the first quarter, there were 74 members and the dividend was 9d. Now there are around 296,000 members.

When the Society reached its 150th birthday in 2011, it celebrated with a year of special events including a ‘Big Birthday Bash’ playing host to Lulu and indie rock band Scouting For Girls. It renovated a 1970s ‘birthday bus’ and an exhibition was held at The Museum of Lincolnshire Life, showcasing the Society’s eventful history and a memory book, where members had shared comments about their Co-op from over the years. Over half a million pounds was also donated to local good causes through the ‘Big Birthday Awards’.

== Trading ==
=== Grocery retail ===
The Society operates food stores. All of the stores sell a range of locally sourced produce called ‘Love Local’ which is made up of items from the local area. Products include Lincolnshire Poacher cheese made in Alford and Pipers Crisps made in Brigg.

=== Foodservice ===
The Love Local range includes a selection of baked goods including bread, cakes and Lincolnshire treats like plum bread made by the Society’s own bakery called Gadsby’s based near Newark. Lincolnshire Co-op also operate a coffee shop business.

=== Pharmacy ===
The Society runs pharmacies that dispense and deliver prescriptions. All of the outlets have consultation rooms where people can have private advice from pharmacists and trained advisors. They offer a range of services including sexual health checks and blood pressure tests.

=== Funeral services ===
Funeral services are another part of Lincolnshire Co-op’s family of businesses. It has provided the service for over 125 years. It offers a complete funeral arrangement service, funeral plans, and links clients to a bereavement counselling service.

In November 2013, Lincolnshire Co-op opened South Lincolnshire Crematorium, a community facility available for ceremonies organised by all local funeral directors. It includes a memorial garden, a flower court and a chapel that seats 100 people. In addition, the division includes a memorial mason.

=== Travel agency ===
The Society has travel branches which provide a wide range of services from holiday bookings to insurance, car hire, currency, car parking and more. Many branches also offer specialist extras like cruise, wedding and ski experts.

=== Property, post offices, filling stations and florist ===
Lincolnshire Co-op also has a commercial property arm and runs post offices, filling stations, and a florist.

=== Subsidiaries ===
The following trading companies are fully owned subsidiary undertakings of the parent society:

- Lincoln Co-operative Chemists Ltd.
- LCS Retail Limited
- Lincoln Shop Equipment Ltd.
- LCS Property Limited
- Lincoln Corn Exchange and Markets (1991) Ltd.
- F Maltby & Sons Ltd
- Gadsby’s of Southwell Ltd.
- Greetwell Developments Ltd.
- Ellcee Limited

== See also ==
- British co-operative movement
- Lincolnshire Co-operative Challenge
- Lincolnshire Credit Union
