= Sam the Wheels =

Britain's first black documentary filmmaker (1927–2025)

Clovis Salmon - Sam the Wheels OBE
- Born: Clovis Constantine Salmon; 13 April 1927; Jamaica
- Died: 18 June 2025 (aged 98); London, England
- Occupations: Documentary filmmaker, wheel builder
- Children: 5
- Website: https://clovissalmonobe.org/

Clovis Constantine Salmon OBE (13 April 1927 – 18 June 2025), better known as Sam the Wheels, was a Jamaican-born British filmmaker and bicycle repairman.

== Early life and career ==
Salmon was born in Jamaica on 13 April 1927. As a young man in Jamaica he ran a bicycle shop. Upon moving to London in November 1957, his first job was at a Claud Butler shop on Clapham Manor Street and later Holdsworth Cycle Co.

== Documentary work ==
Salmon was a self-taught filmmaker who filmed hundreds of hours of footage covering community life in south London, although he was not widely recognised until 2021. He began filming in 1959, after buying a projector. Originally, he filmed as a way to send updates to his family in Jamaica. His early films were mostly of church services and music performances. As he developed more skills, he edited the raw footage into short films, adding voice-overs, music, and footage from other sources, producing a collage effect.

His films covered the establishment of the first Black church in Brixton in the 1960s, and the Brixton Uprising in 1981. During the uprising, he used a concealed camera to avoid police confiscation.

Salmon continued to film into his later years.

Salmon's films have been shown at Brixton Cycles, the Barbican Centre cinema and at Autograph gallery. He was represented by 198 Gallery in Brixton.

In the 2024 New Year Honours, he was appointed an Officer of the Order of the British Empire (OBE) "for services to Culture and to the Black Community." That year, he also received a Lifetime Achiever Award from the National Diversity Awards.

== Personal life ==
Salmon was married. He lived on Railton Road, Brixton, London. In his later years, Salmon was a Pentecostal minister. After retiring, he ran a bicycle repair program out of his home.

Salmon died at King’s College Hospital in Camberwell, on 18 June 2025, at the age of 98. He was survived by his wife Delores, five children, and ten grandchildren.
