= Greencity Wholefoods =

Scottish worker co-operative wholefoods wholesaler

Coordinates: 55.857°N 4.208°W

Scottish Wholefoods Collective Warehouse Limited
- Trade name: Greencity Wholefoods
- Company type: Worker co-operative
- Industry: Wholesaler
- Founded: 6 June 1978; 48 years ago
- Headquarters: Dennistoun, Glasgow, Scotland
- Area served: Scotland
- Products: Whole food, organic food and natural products
- Revenue: £7.7 million (2019)
- Number of employees: 54
- Website: greencity.coop

Greencity Wholefoods is a worker co-operative wholefoods wholesaler in Glasgow, Scotland. The co-operative was founded in 1978 in Hillington, in the outskirts of Glasgow before moving in 1983 to its current location in Dennistoun in the city's East End. In 2019 the co-operative reported an annual turnover of £7.7 million and has 54 employee-members.

As a worker co-operative the business is directly owned and controlled by its workers through a directly elected management committee and quarterly general meetings. The co-operative operates a flat wage structure, with every member paid the same hourly wage, alongside a flat management structure and a system of rotating the co-operative's directly elected managers. Greencity has many similarities with Suma, a worker co-operative in West Yorkshire, and stocks many Suma brand products.

The co-operative delivers goods across Scotland, except for the Highlands and Islands which are covered by Greencity's sister co-operative Highland Wholefoods Workers Co-operative which Greencity helped establish in 1989.

== See also ==
- Suma worker co-operative
