= PPA =

PPA may refer to:

== Biology and medicine ==
- Palpatio per anum, a rectal examination
- Parahippocampal place area, in the brain
- Phenylpropanolamine, a largely discontinued decongestant drug
- Primary progressive aphasia, a neurological condition affecting language

== Politics, government, and military ==
- Public Policy and Administration, an academic journal on public administration, often abbreviated as PPA
- Paraguayan People's Army, a group considered a terrorist organization by the Paraguayan state
- Parti du Peuple Algerien, an Algerian political party
- Philadelphia Parking Authority, a parking agency in Pennsylvania, United States
- Philippine Ports Authority
- Progressive Peoples Alliance, a political party in Nigeria
- Protestant Protective Association, anti-Catholic organization
- People's Party of Arunachal, an Indian regional political party
- Popski's Private Army, a small World War II Special Forces unit of the British 8th Army
- Thaon di Revel-class offshore patrol vessel (Italian: Pattugliatore Polivalente d'Altura), an offshore patrol vessel of the Italian Navy

== Businesses and organizations ==
=== Businesses ===
- Palau Pacific Airways, a defunct charter airline
- Piraeus Port Authority, Greece

=== Professional and trade associations ===
- Pakistan Pharmacists Association
- Professional Photographers of America
- Professional Publishers Association
- Pictorial Photographers of America, founded by Clarence Hudson White with several others in 1916
- Pre-School Playgroups Association, a British charitable organisation

== Laws ==
- Pension Protection Act of 2006, United States
- Pollution Prevention Act of 1990, United States
- Public Procurement Act (Switzerland)

== Business ==
- Power purchase agreement, a contract for the purchase of electrical energy
- Purchase price allocation

== Mathematics ==
- Point pattern analysis, in geometry
- PPA (complexity), a class of computational search problems

== Sports ==
- Professional Pickleball Association
- Professional Putters Association
- Poker Players Alliance, a USA advocacy/lobbying group

== Technology and science ==
- Pay-per-action
- Personal Package Archive, an Ubuntu Linux software repository for managing source packages
- Polyphthalamide, semi-crystalline high-temperature plastic in the Nylon family
- Polyphosphoric acid
- PPa, symbol for the unit of pressure, petapascal (10^{15} pascal)
- pPa, symbol for the unit of pressure, picopascal (10^{−12} pascal)

== Other uses ==
- Participatory poverty assessment
- Provisional application, commonly known as a 'provisional patent application'
- Planning, preparation and assessment, an allocation given to teaching professionals as part of their timetable
- Przegląd Piosenki Aktorskiej
