= Suma (co-operative) =

Wholefoods wholesaler in West Yorkshire, England

Coordinates: 53.6956°N 1.8264°W

Triangle Wholefoods Collective Limited
- Trade name: Suma
- Type: Worker co-operative
- Industry: Wholesaler
- Founded: 1977
- Headquarters: Elland, West Yorkshire, United Kingdom
- Area served: United Kingdom
- Products: Whole food, organic food and natural products
- Revenue: £58.7 million (2019)
- Members: 200 worker-owners (2019)
- Website: suma.coop

Suma is the trading name of the Triangle Wholefoods Collective Limited, a worker co-operative wholefoods wholesaler. It was founded in Leeds in 1977 and is now based in Elland, West Yorkshire. It is the largest independent wholefood wholesaler in the United Kingdom as well as the country's largest common ownership co-operative. The co-operative specializes in vegetarian, fairly traded, organic, ethical, ecological and natural products.

Its turnover for the year ending 2019 was reported as £54 million, ranking it 49th among British co-operatives.

In 2019, they secured Fair Tax Mark certification.

== History ==
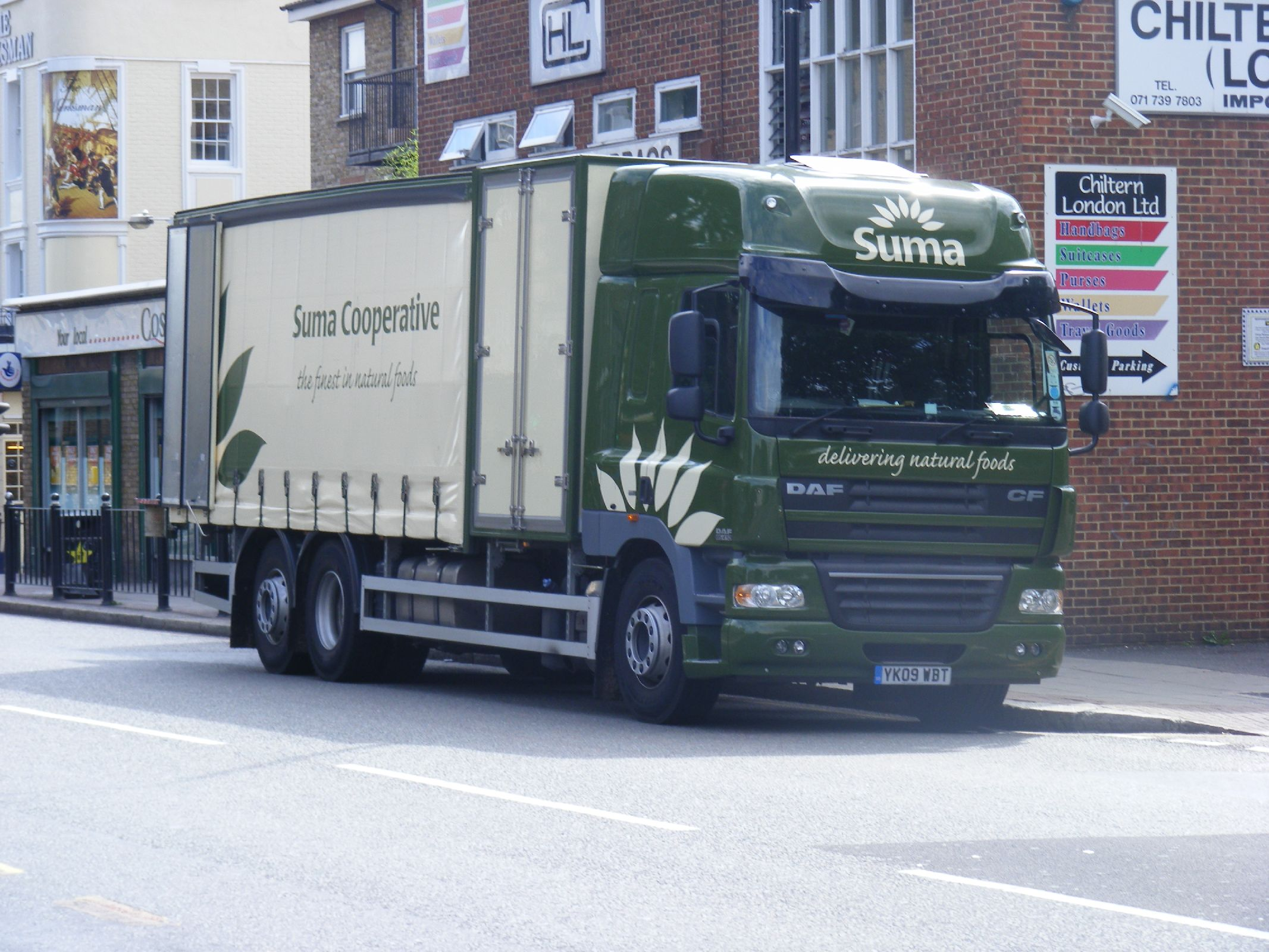
A Suma delivery lorry in Hackney, London, 2009

Suma was started in 1975 by Reg Tayler, who had worked with wholefoods in London. In Leeds, he opened a retail shop. In August 1975, at a meeting with all the wholefood shops in the north of England, he proposed they set up wholefoods wholesaling co-operative in order to supply each other.

== See also ==
- Greencity Wholefoods
