= British co-operative movement =

Co-operative movement in the UK

The United Kingdom is home to a widespread and diverse co-operative movement, with over 7,000 registered co-operatives owned by 17 million individual members and which contribute £34bn a year to the British economy. Modern co-operation started with the Rochdale Pioneers' shop in the northern English town of Rochdale in 1844, though the history of co-operation in Britain can be traced back to before 1800. The British co-operative movement is most commonly associated with The Co-operative brand (best known for its supermarket and Funeralcare brands) which has been adopted by several large consumers' co-operative societies; however, there are many thousands of registered co-operative businesses operating in the UK. Alongside these consumers' co-operatives, there exist many prominent agricultural co-operatives (621), co-operative housing providers (619), health and social care cooperatives (111), cooperative schools (834), retail co-operatives, co-operatively run community energy projects, football supporters' trusts, credit unions, and worker-owned businesses.

Co-operatives UK is the central membership organisation for co-operative enterprise throughout the UK. This is a co-operative of co-operatives: a co-operative federation. Most kinds of co-operatives are eligible to join Co-operatives UK.

== Origins of the British co-operative movement ==
Though the history of the co-operative movement in the UK is often traced back to the Rochdale Pioneers of 1844, the history of co-operation can be traced back much further. The origins of modern co-operatives owe their beginnings not simply to the extreme poverty faced by many in the 18th and 19th centuries, but also to the rapid social changes of urbanisation, the rising food prices which resulted from the marketisation of the economy and from the lack of political representation for the working class during this period. These factors led to a number of social changes including an increased focus on mutual businesses (notably co-operatives) in public discourse during this time and also to events such as the Swing Riots of 1830. Early co-ops often focused on the provision of essential services (notably food) to members where the market was either unable to provide these services sufficiently or was considered unjust. Often the more successful co-ops were established around the trades which were experiencing the largest impact from the rapid industrialisation such as mining and weaving. This was likely due to the clearer direct benefits of membership and the solidarity of workers with a similar plight. The provision of food was a highly successful area for co-ops with many becoming involved in milling and baking bread. The Hull Anti-Mill Co-op, established in 1795 and which traded for a century, provides an example of such a successful society.

=== Rochdale Society of Equitable Pioneers ===
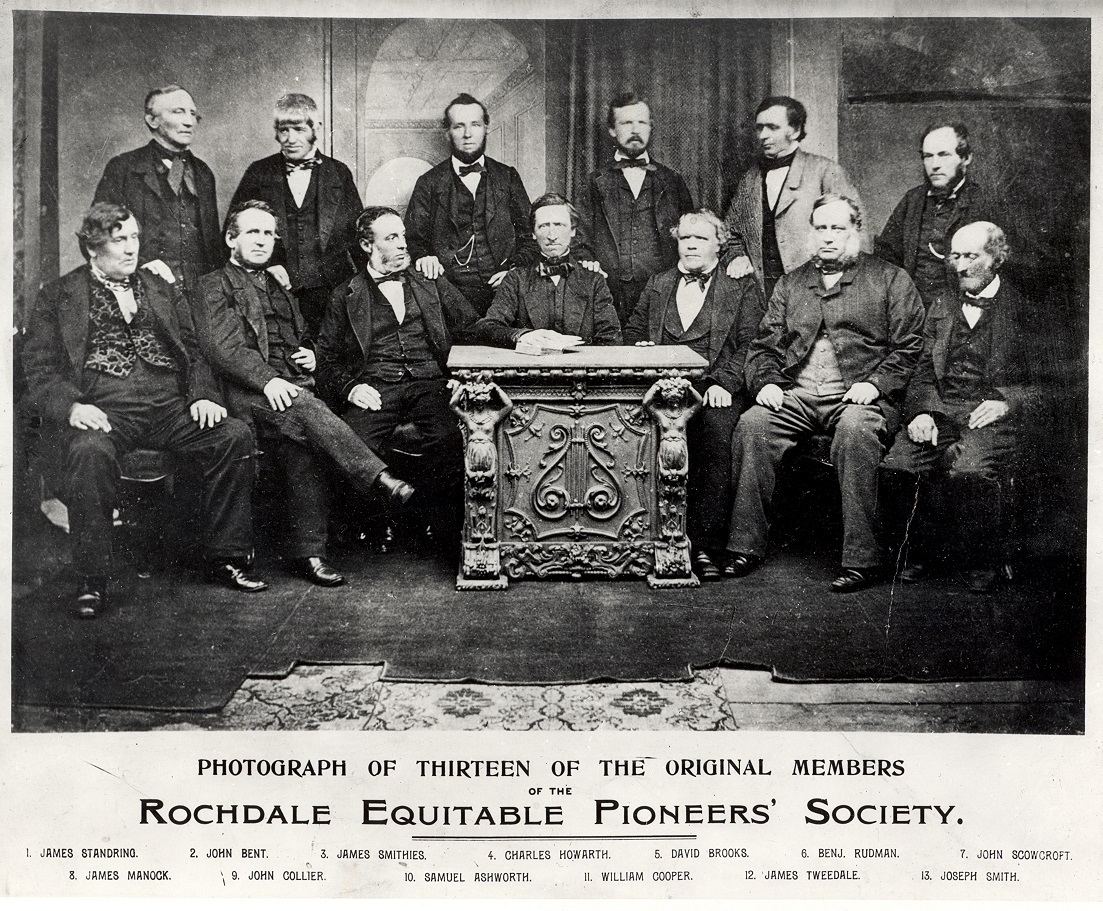
1865 photograph of 13 of the Rochdale Pioneers, who in 1844 established the Rochdale Society of Equitable Pioneers

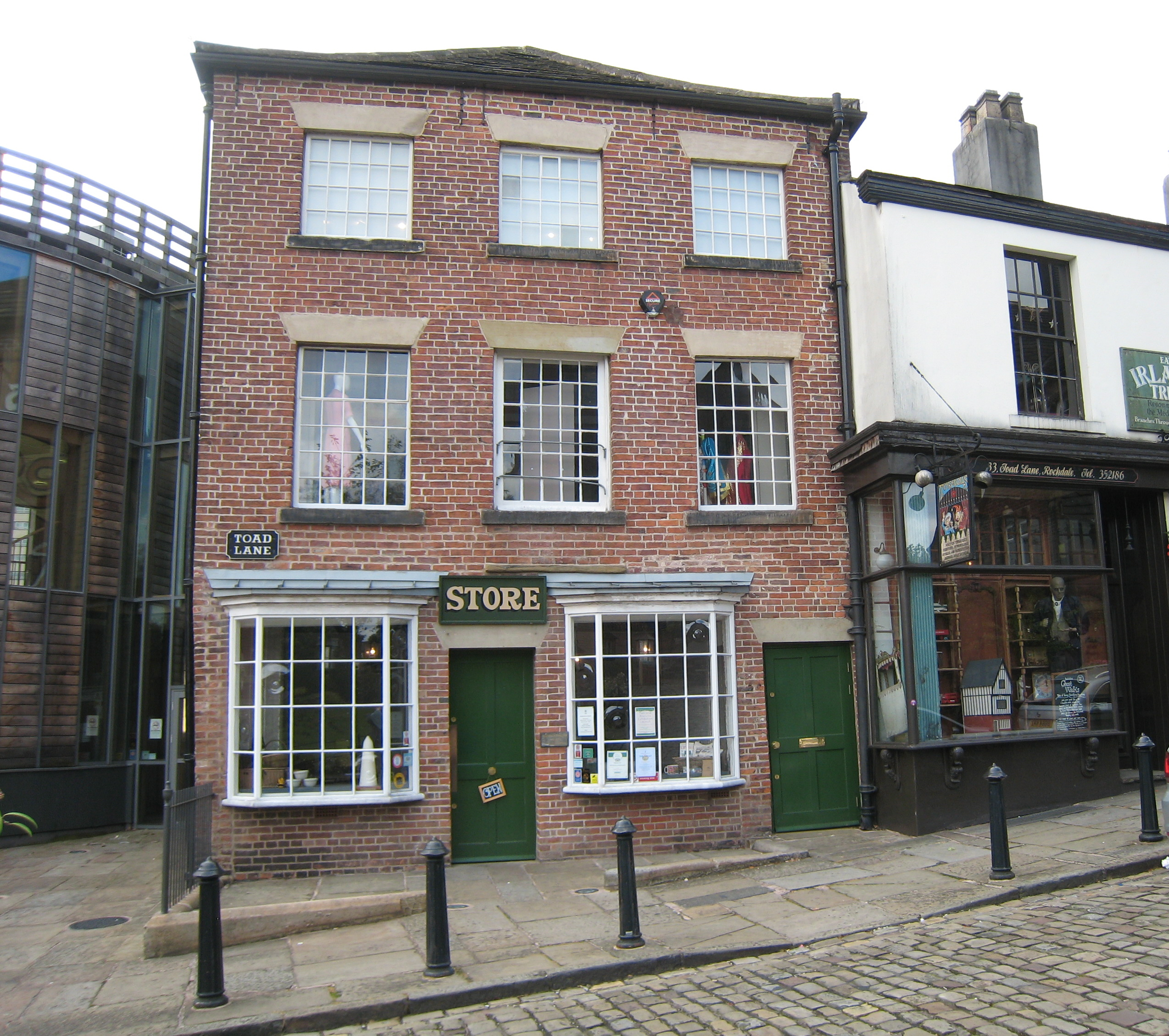
The original Rochdale Pioneers shop, now home to the Rochdale Pioneers museum

Though many co-operative societies had been established by the 1840s, many had not been successful with societies often suffering through financial maladministration or fraud, owing to the very limited legislation surrounding such enterprises. During the boom times, when work in the factories was more fruitful, co-operative societies also had difficulty encouraging people to retain their membership owing to perception of its limited financial benefits. It became understood that some kind of economic benefit for membership was required alongside the educational and social benefits. It was the implementation of the patronage dividend and the formalisation of the Rochdale Principles which led to the success of the Rochdale Society of Equitable Pioneers which was established in December 1844, a business which continues to this day as a part of The Co-operative Group. The Rochdale Pioneers society became highly successful with 1,400 members in 1855 and the co-op expanded further, after opening additional stores, to have 5,560 members by 1870. This success encouraged a boom in co-operatives in the following decades across the UK, but predominately across the industrial heartlands of northern England.

By 1860 there were more than 200 co-ops in the north west of England which were running in a similar manner to the Rochdale society. Private shopkeepers became resentful of the competition which they were experiencing from these new co-operative stores, often as they saw the dividend as an unfair competitive advantage, and so some powerful shopkeepers lobbied for wholesalers to stop supplying these new co-operative societies. Though few such boycotts actually occurred, this threat worried many people in the co-operative movement and so they endeavoured to create a co-operative wholesaler to supply at least some key products to co-operative stores. The Industrial and Provident Societies Act 1862 enabled co-operative societies to invest in other co-operative societies, in effect permitting co-operative federations. Following this the North of England Co-operative Wholesale Industrial and Provident Society Limited, later renamed the Co-operative Wholesale Society (CWS) was launched in Manchester by 300 individual co-operatives in Yorkshire and Lancashire during 1863. The Scottish Co-operative Wholesale Society was founded in 1868.

== Consumers' co-operatives (retail and food) ==
The largest and most recognised part of the UK movement are the many consumers' co-operatives. They are co-operative businesses run for the benefit of their customer members. Of these co-operatives, the largest sector is food retailing, though they have a significant presence in other sectors such as travel agencies and funeral directors. The late 20th and early 21st centuries have seen a gradual exit by these businesses from the non-food retailing market.

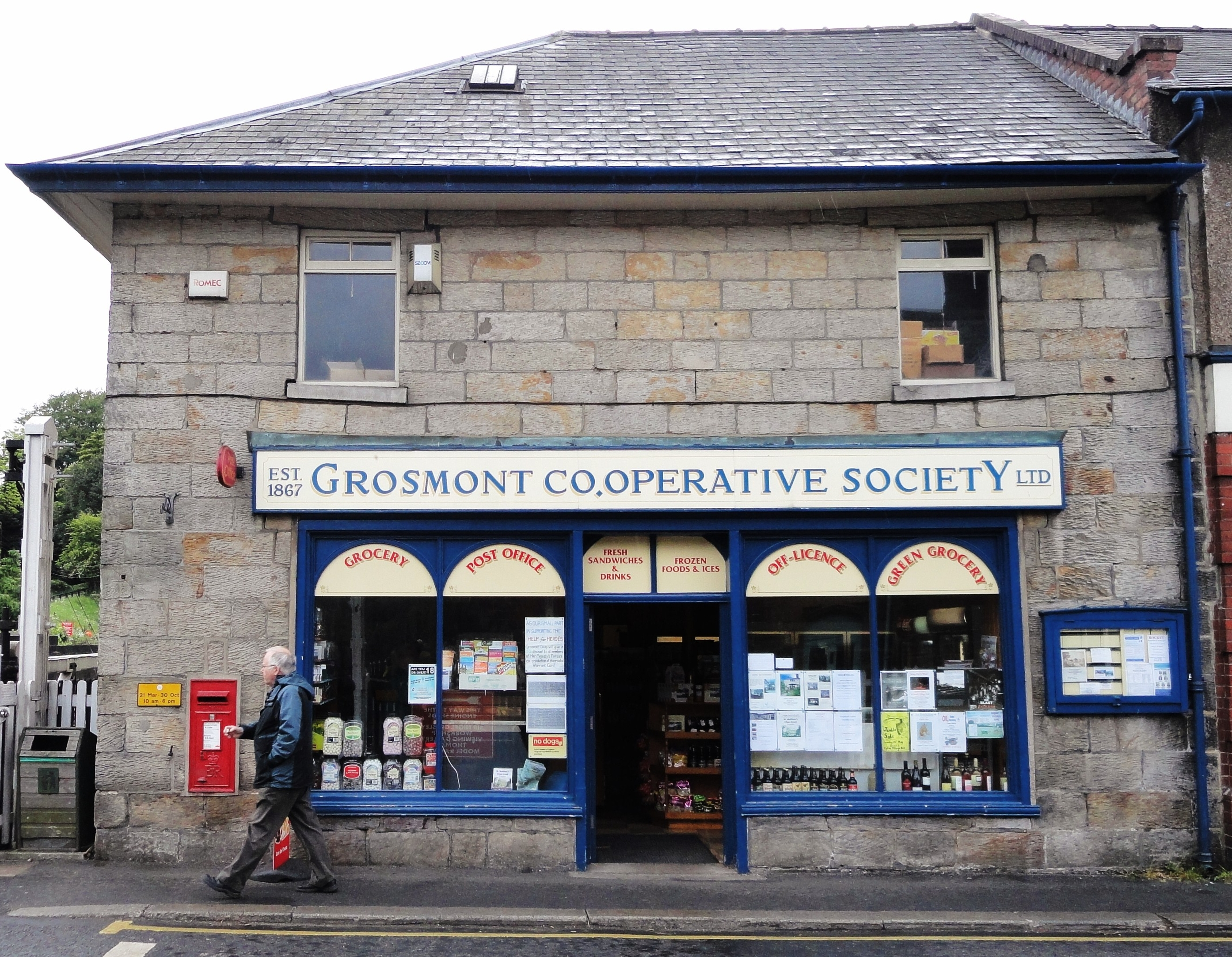
The Grosmont Co-operative Society remains an independent co-op store.

Many co-operatives (by convention known as co-operative societies) started out in a single village, town or city usually with just a single store. Here, members would be customers of the society's trading location and the society would reward these members with a proportion of any profits based on that member's spending with the society, or a dividend. This is a fundamental difference between a co-operative and a joint stock company. Most societies were small, and by 1900, there were 1,439 co-operatives covering virtually every area of the UK. Gradually, many societies expanded by opening further stores or by merging with a neighbouring society. Today, there is one dominant, national society, The Co-operative Group, and a number of large regional co-operative societies such as Central England Co-operative, the Midcounties Co-operative and Scotmid. Many of these large co-operative societies have businesses in a number of sectors, are led by their values principles and owned by their members. Membership is open to everyone and alongside being democratically involved in the decision making of the societies, every year members receive a share of the profits based on the amount made in profits that year and the how much they had spent with any of its businesses. In the case of The Co-operative Group, the society has over four million members and 3,600 trading outlets for its family of business which comprises groceries, insurance reselling, funerals, funeral plans, legal services and loans. In contrast to these large regional or national societies, some have remained with a single store such as Shepley Co-op, Grosmont Co-op, Coniston Co-op and Allendale Co-op.

The decline, through mergers, of single shop co-operatives, was reversed by two trends. Firstly, around 170 community owned shops were established since 1979, many of which are co-operatives. Secondly, the United States food co-operative movement was replicated in the UK: some of the independent food co-operatives established in the late 20th and early 21st centuries operate shops.

=== History of the British consumer co-operative movement ===
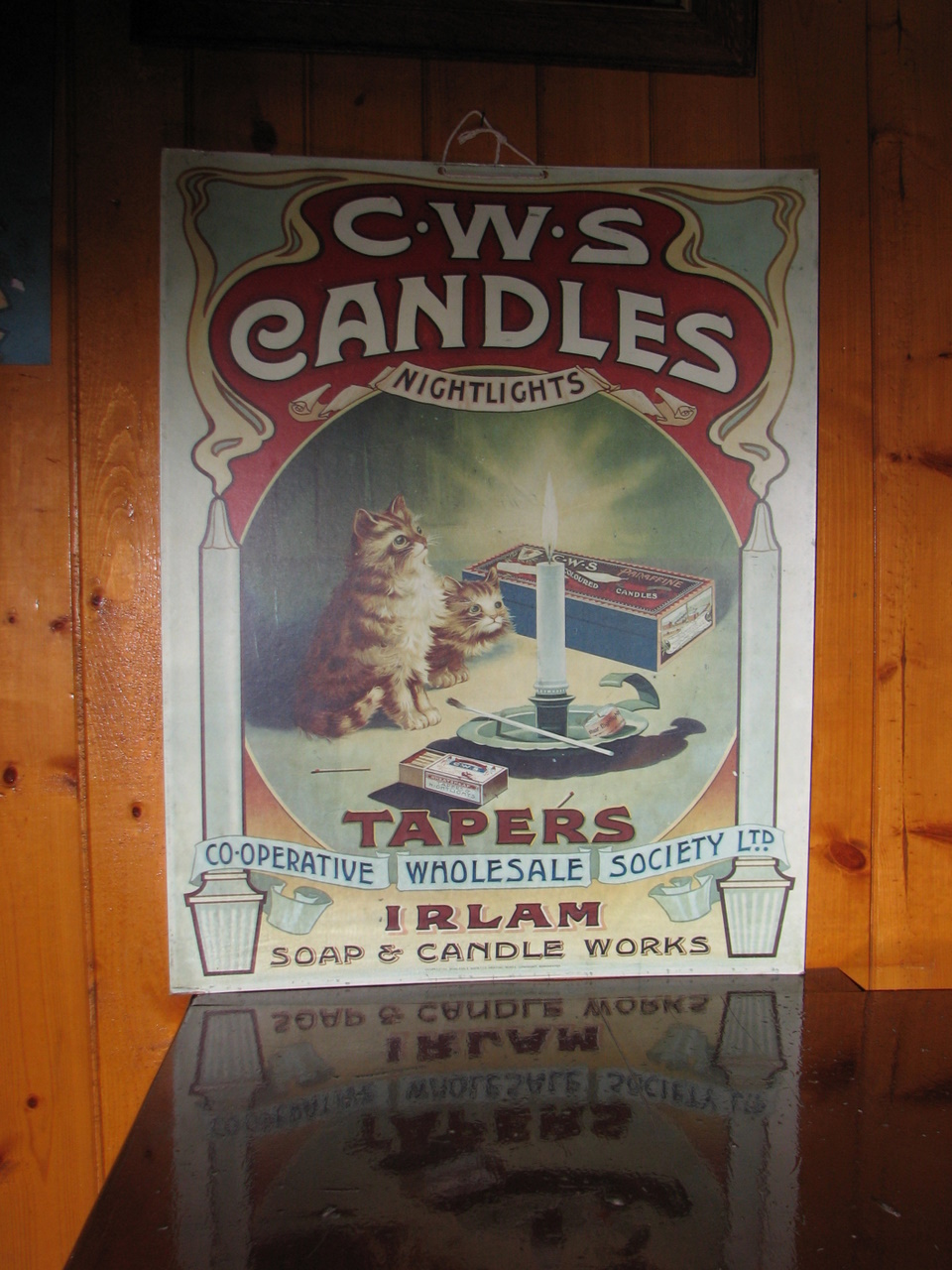
An advert for CWS candles

By 1860 there were more than 200 co-ops in the north west of England which were running in a similar manner to the Rochdale society. Private shopkeepers became resentful of the competition which they were experiencing from these new co-operative stores, often as they saw the dividend as an unfair competitive advantage, and so some powerful shopkeepers lobbied for wholesalers to stop supplying these new co-operative societies. Though few such boycotts actually occurred, this threat worried many people in the co-operative movement and so they endeavoured to create a co-operative wholesaler to supply at least some key products to co-operative stores. The North of England Co-operative Wholesale Industrial and Provident Society Limited, later renamed the Co-operative Wholesale Society (CWS) was launched in Manchester by 300 individual co-operatives in Yorkshire and Lancashire during 1863. The Scottish Co-operative Wholesale Society was founded in 1868. The CWS grew rapidly and supplied produce to co-operative stores across England, competing fiercely for trade from co-operative societies with other non-co-operative wholesalers which led to the CWS becoming highly innovative. By 1890 the CWS had established significant branches in Leeds, Blackburn, Bristol, Nottingham and Huddersfield alongside a number of factories which produced biscuits (Manchester), Boots (Leicester), Soap (Durham) and textiles (Batley). This rapid expansion continued so that by the outbreak of World War I the CWS had major offices in the United States, Denmark, Australia and a tea plantation in India.

Many, fiercely local, societies saw the CWS as a valuable supplier but did not want to exclusively purchase produce from a single source. In order to increase loyalty to the CWS, they started to assist the local retail societies in more ways than simply as a wholesaler. The CWS Bank, the precursor to The Co-operative Bank, financed loans for societies to use for expansion through purchasing new buildings, land or new equipment. After the acquisition of the Co-operative Insurance Society in 1913, the CWS also provided insurance services to members and the CWS also began providing legal services – all business which remain today. It was hoped that these financial ties, as well as the CWS corporate dividend, would increase loyalty to the CWS. During World War II rationing led to an effective pause in any major changes to the co-operative movement in the UK with the CWS becoming highly involved in sourcing overseas goods for UK consumers and manufacturing wartime goods. Following the war there was some attempt to modernise the co-operative stores. After the London Co-operative Society opened its first self-service shop in 1942 the co-operative movement led the way on the development of self-service stores to the point where, by the 1950s, 90% of self-service shops in the UK were run by co-operatives. Despite this the market share and the number of members of the society began to dwindle and - importantly - so did the member share capital which societies used to invest. The CWS responded with an operational facelift in 1968 which introduced the first national co-operative branding, the 'Co-op' cloverleaf. Though this led to some improvements the movement (including the CWS) remained largely unreformed with its grocery market share continuing its downward trend. It was also suggested around this time that societies merge to form regional societies to improve their competitiveness through the economies of scale. Many local co-op societies strongly resisted such mergers but, as their financial situation declined, many were forced to merge to create regional societies or with either the CRS or the SCWS to avoid failing. Consolidation within the movement was considerable and in 1973 serious financial mismanagement of the SCWS Bank led to the SCWS and the CWS merging to form a single UK-wide wholesale society.

The co-operative movement's market share and profitability continued to decline during the 1970s and 80s in part due to a number of reasons. Firstly the process of de-industrialisation which characterised the period led to serious economic difficulties in many of the movements heartlands (notably the northern industrial towns) which disproportionally impacted on the societies through a decrease in consumer spending despite the British economy seeing a rise in consumer disposable income overall. This was largely due to the strong increase in inequality in the UK at this time and the co-operative movement was not well placed to tap into this increase in middle class spending due to the geographic spread of its stores and the co-op's historic association as the shop for the 'working poor'. Secondly redevelopment projects in many cities between the 1950s and 1970s often moved people from rows of terraced housing (which featured co-op stores dotted throughout) to newer purpose-built estates, with around 18,000 co-op stores closing as they become redundant in this way. Thirdly the time was a period of notable inflation and a strong pound which led to a wave of cheap imported goods – this devastated much of the UKs manufacturing businesses (including the CWS). By the 1980s it became clear that the trend in the retail sector was towards large (often out of town) supermarkets and hypermarkets with hundreds of them appearing across the UK. The co-operative movement did build some superstores, having 74 by 1986, but often their development and competitiveness was hindered by the lack of a national distribution network and price competitiveness.

During the 1980s financial troubles and an increasing number of co-operative societies led to the CWS began rescuing many of these (after the CRS began to struggle financially from the number of failing co-ops that it had merged with), the CWS having returned to direct retailing after its merger with the SCWS the decade before. It was these mergers with consumers' co-operatives which led to the co-op having both corporate (co-op societies) and individual members and hence making it both a primary and secondary co-operative. The CWS's expansion into direct retailing (especially after the mergers of the 2000s) led to the CWS becoming such a highly visible business in the UK. The legacy of this was that many people consider the British co-operative movement to be one business, The Co-operative Group.

By the start of the 1990s the co-operative movement's share of the UK grocery market had declined to the point where the entire business model was under question. This was at a time when many building societies were demutualising as many of the public preferred the short-term financial gain of the windfall payment over the perceived lack of benefits from the mutual model. For a time it seemed as though the mutual or co-op model was almost dead – though around the 2008 financial crisis almost all of the demutualised building societies either failed or were forced to merge with a larger bank for support reigniting much debate on the virtues of the mutual and co-op models. The co-op's reputation was not helped in this respect by the factions within the movement, notably the strong rivalry between the CRS and the CWS, acting in a manner which exacerbated the belief held by many members of the public that, rather than working for the interests of all members, co-ops were largely acting in the self-interests of a dominant 'clique' of members within each society. Together these crises meant that the 1990s would become a crucial decade if 'The Co-op' was to survive. In order to raise capital to invest in its food stores (and also the increasingly successful The Co-operative Bank) the CWS sold many of its factories to Andrew Regan in 1994 for £111 million before in 1997 he posed a highly ambitious £1.2bn hostile takeover attempt of the CWS. This shocked many in the movement and consolidated support for the CWS as the 'linchpin' of the movement in a way that many had previous opposed. The CWS was able to defend itself from this takeover bid and after investigations by a private detective and a subsequent criminal court case, Regan's bid was rejected and two senior CWS executives were dismissed and imprisoned for fraud. An arrest warrant was issued for Andrew Regan in 1999 however he had already emigrated to Monaco.

The shock that Mr Regan's bid sent through the co-operative movement has been attributed with sowing the seeds for the merger of the CRS and the CWS in 1999. The merger took two years to complete and the launch of the newly combined business, named The Co-operative Group, was timed with the release of the 2001 Co-operative Commission report, chaired by John Monks, which proposed a strategy of modernisation which focused on improving store design and building a consistent branding whilst also driving for efficiency savings to make the food business more competitive - the similarity in conclusions between the 1919, 1958 and 2001 reports highlights the distinct lack of progress within the movement during this time. The 2001 report also highlighted the need to market what it called 'The Co-operative Advantage' which suggested that commercial success would provide the funding for the social goals of the movement which (when the public saw a tangible benefit to their own lives) would provide a competitive advantage to the co-op which would further its commercial success - a virtuous cycle. Unlike Gaitskell Commission's 1958 report the recommendations of the report, notably the major update to "The Co-operative brand" and the re-launch of the membership dividend scheme, were largely adopted by the co-operative movement including The Co-operative Group. These changes to the business are largely credited with the successes in profitability and the achievement in social goals which improved in the years after the Co-operative Commission report.

This is not to say that modernisation of the CWS had not been under way for some time. Since 1993 the CRTG had been working to switch the role of the CWS from 'selling to' to 'buying for' co-operative societies as a way of maximising the economies of scale to become more competitive to the major supermarkets. Since the 1960s the co-op had been following retail trends after they had occurred, always having to catch up, in a way that it led the changes before World War II. Many leaders in the movement began to appreciate that this 'me too' approach to retailing was not working, for example expanding into hypermarkets after Tesco and Sainsbury's had already developed a dominant position but without the resources to compete on price. As an attempt to differentiate itself from its larger competitors The Co-operative Bank had introduced an ethical policy in 1992 and this, along with its technical innovation, was well received with customers. The CWS decided that, though it had always aimed to trade responsibly (for example though the working conditions in its factories and plantations as well as its boycott of South African produce during the years of Apartheid, by cementing its 'ethical' credentials in a series of strong and clear policy commitments it could work to convince the public of the 'co-operative difference'. This move posed a bold step for the CWS leadership as this was a wholly new approach for such a large business. The CWS worked with The Fairtrade Foundation to help introduce the Fairtrade Mark in the UK, it was an early adopter of the RSPCA's 'Freedom Foods' animal welfare certification, it introduced the first supermarket line of 'environmentally friendly' household products and the first range of toiletries certified by Cruelty Free International as not tested on animals. This new adoption of an ethical strategy was only part of the CWS's changes. After the 1997 strategic review the business suggested that it close the majority of its hypermarkets and department stores and instead focus on its core chain of convenience stores, another significant proposal.

=== List of retail societies ===
Society	Website	Founded	Members	Activities (number of outlets)
Allendale	allendalecoop.co.uk	1862		Food (1)
Bathford	www.bathford.net/BEFA.php	2006	200 (2009)	Food (1)
Central England	centralengland.coop	1854 and 1876	329,000	Food (255), funerals (98), travel (111), non-food (44), petrol (12), opticians (2)
Channel Islands	channelislands.coop	1919		Food (23), non-food (3: two 'Homemaker' stores and one 'Totalsport' store), travel (3), funeral (1 – branded as 'De Gruchy's')
Clydebank	Clydebank Co-operative Society	1881		Food (6)
Coniston	Coniston Co-operative Society	1896		Food (1)
The Co-operative Group	co-operative.coop	1844	6m (estimate)	Food (2,786), funeral (900), insurance, legal services, electrical products
East of England	eastofengland.coop	1858	≈350,000	
Grosmont		1867		
Heart of England	heartofengland.coop	1832	179,657	Food (33), non-food (21), funeral (9), travel (3), post offices (4)
Langdale	langdalecooperative.co.uk	1884		Food and non-food (1)
Lincolnshire	lincolnshire.coop	1861	▲149,247 (2007)	Food (83), Gadsby's Bakery, pharmacies (29), coffee shops (3), non-food (0), post offices (41), travel (9), funeral (9), motors (0), petrol (6), cash registers
Midcounties	midcounties.coop			Food (254), travel (46), pharmacy (46), funerals (81), childcare (46), post offices (92)
Radstock	www.radstock-co-op.com	1867	7,500	Food (14)
Scotmid	scotmid.coop			Food (204)
Steeple Ashton		2005	230 (2007)	Food (1)
Southern	southern.coop	1873	93,000 (2009)	Food (120), funerals (31)
Tamworth	tamworth.coop			Food (14), non-food (2), funeral (8)
Wine Society	thewinesociety.com			Wine

== Former Co-operatively formed businesses ==
Both the Co-operative Bank and the Co-operative Group mutuals retain memberships of Co-ops UK due to their continued contribution to co-operation.

== Utility co-operatives ==
Utility co-operatives provide their members with services such as telecommunications, energy and water.

The Phone Co-op was established in 1998 and provides broadband, fixed line and mobile telecoms services to consumers and organisations. Today this trade is part of the Our Co-op Co-operative and provides business services, landline, mobile telephone and broadband services.

Energy Co-op is an energy supplier which is operated on behalf of Our Co-op by Octopus Energy for Central England Co-operative society members, making it the only co-operative supplier in the UK energy market. The businesses key differentiator product is the community power tariff which sources household electricity from community owned renewable sources across the country and claims to have half of all producers signed up to PPAs. community owned renewable energy schemes have included the Great Dunkilns Farm wind turbine at St Briavels in Gloucestershire and Westmill Wind Farm Co-operative.

== Financial co-operatives ==
=== Credit unions ===
Credit unions are a loan and savings co-operative. Members normally have a 'common bond' to make them eligible for membership. Commons bonds are usually that all members live in a certain locality, work for a common employer or belong to the same trade union, church or association. Because of the need for a common bond, most credit unions remain rather small. Credit unions are run in a not-for-profit way. This means they use their money to run their services and reward their members – not to pay outside shareholders. They must set money aside each year to ensure they don't go bust. They use any leftover money to provide better services to members or share evenly among savings accounts (a dividend)

In Great Britain (England, Scotland and Wales), credit unions are regulated by the Financial Services Authority who set certain standard and approve the people who hold important positions within a credit union. All credit unions must have the words 'credit union' in the title, or in Wales they can have 'undeb credyd'. The main trade association for credit unions in Great Britain is the Association of British Credit Unions Ltd (ABCUL). ABCUL is based in Holyoake House, a Grade One listed building in Manchester owned by Co-operatives^{UK}.

In Northern Ireland, credit unions are currently regulated by the Department of Enterprise, Trade and Investment and registered by its registry function – the Registry of Credit Unions and Industrial and Provident Societies. However, there are proposals for regulatory reform, set out by HM Treasury and the DETI, which detail transferring registration and regulatory responsibility for credit unions in Northern Ireland to the Financial Services Authority. The main trade association for credit unions throughout the island of Ireland is the Irish League of Credit Unions.

== Housing ==
Housing co-operatives are owned and democratically controlled by its member-tenants. As described by its website at https://www.cch.coop/about-the-cch/ , The Confederation of Co-operative Housing is the UK's national body for housing co-ops.

== Worker ==
A worker co-operative is a co-operative owned and democratically controlled by its employees. There are no outside- or consumer-owners in a worker co-operative. Only the workers own shares of the business. It is estimated that there are approximately 403 worker owned and controlled co-operatives in the United Kingdom. In 2009 Co-operatives^{UK} recorded a combined turnover of £144 million with assets of £32 million as part of the Co-operative Review 2009.

The largest employee-owned company in the UK is the John Lewis Partnership. Though John Lewis is a public limited company, its shares are held in trust on behalf of the employees rather than being traded on the London Stock Exchange. Each employee (referred to as "partner" within John Lewis) has a say in how the company is run and each year they are awarded an equal percentage share of the profits based on their salary. In the past ten years, this has amounted to between one and two months' salary for partners. The John Lewis Partnership operates twenty-six department stores and a web store under the John Lewis division and 187 (Dec 2007) supermarkets in the Waitrose division. The company's presence is more marked in the south and east of England though it is gradually expanding to other areas of Great Britain.

Suma is the largest independent wholefood wholesaler-distributor in the United Kingdom and a workers' co-operative. Suma specialise in vegetarian, Fairtrade, organic, ethical and natural products. Greencity Wholefoods is a similar worker co-operative based in Glasgow, Scotland.

Infinity Foods Workers Co-operative is a large independent wholefood business in East Sussex. With a retail outlet with artisan Bakery, Cafe and wholesaler-distribution. Infinity Foods specialise in vegetarian, Fairtrade, organic, ethical and natural products. Infinity Foods workers co-operative has over 100 worker members making it one of the biggest independent employers in the Brighton and Hove area.

Footprint Workers Co-operative, a printing service has been running in Leeds since 1997.

The Edinburgh Bicycle Co-operative is the oldest workers co-operative in Scotland, being established in 1977. It has since expanded and now operates eight stores across Scotland and northern England as well as an online sales platform.. Brixton Cycles, inspired by Edinburgh, opened in 1983 and is also still running today.

== Agricultural ==
Agricultural marketing and supply co-operatives are owned by farmers. Openfield Group, Britain's only national grain marketing and arable inputs co-operative, has over 4,000 farmer owners. Mole Valley Farmers is another example of a supply co-operative founded by farmers.

The late 20th century saw the demutualisation of several large co-operatives, including the large regional West Midland Farmers, which was founded in 1916 as the Atworth and District Agricultural Society. West Midland Farmers renamed itself to Countrywide Farmers in 1999, becoming a joint stock company owned by 11,000 farmers until it went out of business in 2018.

The 1994 break-up of the Milk Marketing Board eventually formed several large dairy marketing co-operatives, including Milk Marque (since demutualised and renamed Community Foods Group), Dairy Farmers of Britain (ceased trading in 2009), Milk Link (merged into Arla Foods in 2012) and First Milk.

== Community co-operatives ==
Community co-operatives are multi-functional businesses "which trade primarily for the benefit of their community and are accountable to that community. They are controlled by the communities themselves, with open and voluntary membership." They have been established particularly in rural areas. Since 1979 around two dozen community co-operatives have been established in the Scottish Highlands and Islands and have carried out retailing, manufacturing and service industries, improving both incomes and the quality of life, often with public support provided through the Highlands and Islands Development Board (HIDB).

=== Community shops ===
Community shops are not dissimilar from food co-ops but are often found in more remote villages and provide some of the services of a convenience store but also frequently have cafe, healthcare or library services. As of 2015, there are 330 community shops in the UK.

=== Community pubs ===
Community pubs have largely resulted from situations where a pub chain has chosen to close a pub, often in a village which is otherwise under-served by pubs. Commonly community pubs in England are established by listing the pub as an Asset of Community Value under the 2011 Localism Act before a group of local people raise sufficient funds to purchase and re-open the pub. Funds are often raised using a community shares scheme and are subsequently run as co-operatives. As of 2015, there are 35 community pubs registered in the UK. In some situations a community pub may also incorporate a community shop.

Examples of community pubs include: The Angler's Rest, Bamford, Fox and Goose, Hebden Bridge, Fox and Hounds, Charwelton, The Rose and Crown, Hexham and The Ivy House in Nunhead, south London.

Community centres

Crossing over sometimes with the function of Community pubs, self-organised social centres or community centres are often worker or volunteer co-operatives. Often starting off as informal collectives or squats, some social centres incorporate, often finding the cooperative model appropriate. These buildings can have community spaces, resources, bars and cafes within them. Examples include Partisan in Manchester, the 1 in 12 Club in Bradford, the Cowley Club in Brighton and the Sumac Centre in Nottingham.

=== Community energy co-operatives ===
A number of community-owned co-operatives have been established to own and run small-scale renewable energy projects. Many of these operate as onshore wind farms, small-scale solar power installations or as micro-hydro projects. Financing for such schemes is often a combination of community shares and loan funding and surplus funds are often distributed (once interest to loan providers and shareholders is paid) to community groups or local development projects. Examples of such co-operatives include the Baywind Energy Co-operative and Torrs Hydro.

== Retailers' ==
Retailers' co-operatives (not to be confused with retail consumer co-operatives, above) provide marketing and wholesaling services to retail businesses.

- Independent retail consumer co-operatives are corporate members of The Co-operative Group, a secondary co-operative. The Co-operative Group manages the Co-operative Federal Retail and Trading Services, servicing 3,200 food stores, including its own and those of its corporate members. The Group also provides other collective buying, marketing and distribution functions.
- Members of the Arizona hoteliers' marketing association, Best Western, have 280 hotels in the UK, as of 2008.
- UK retail business Nisa is part of The Co-operative Group. As of 2008, Nisa represents 300 wholesalers and 674 retailers, with 5000 convenience stores and small supermarkets, including the Costcutter symbol group.
- The Dutch association of retailers and wholesalers, Spar, is very similar to Nisa, but its UK membership is smaller. As of 2008, Spar members have 2,500 outlets in the UK.
- Most retail florists are members of Interflora, a former co-operative that demutualised in 2006 (when it was acquired by its United States affiliate, Florists' Transworld Delivery.)

== Support organisations ==
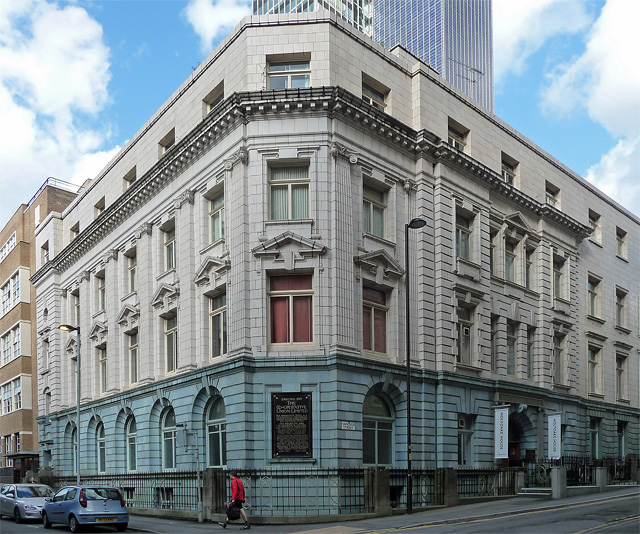
Holyoake House in Manchester, home to a number of co-operatives including Co-operatives UK, the Co-operative College, and Co-op News

In addition to Co-operatives UK, the central membership organisation for British co-operatives, there are a variety of other support organisations and secondary co-operatives serving the sector. The Plunkett Foundation promotes co-operation in rural communities, including the agricultural and retail sectors. There are several other sectoral co-operative bodies, such as the Confederation of Co-operative Housing and Supporters Direct.

Co-operative & Community Finance provides financing for new ventures.

The Co-operative Press publishes Co-op News, the main news organ of the movement. The UK Society for Co-operative Studies brings together academics and co-operators and publishes the Journal of Co-operative Studies.

The Co-operative Party was formed to promote the co-operative sector in Parliament. Retail societies and other co-operatives are among the members of the party, which works with the Labour Party to elect those sympathetic to co-operative issues and to promote co-operation and mutuality. The think tank and consultancy Mutuo was originally developed by the party and now operates independently across the wider mutual sector in the United Kingdom.

The Woodcraft Folk is an organisation widely considered to be the youth arm of the co-operative movement. Woodcraft Folk groups teach the principles of cooperation to children and is financially supported by the Co-operative Group and many other cooperative societies.

The Wales Co-operative Centre is a co-operative development organisation based in Wales. They deliver business support for groups looking to set up co-operatives and social enterprises, and also deliver support around the themes of employee buyout and co-operative consortia working. They also provide support for organisations who are exploring setting up housing co-operatives.

Students for Cooperation is a federation of 30 student co-operatives across the UK. The organisation works to support new and existing student co-ops, and to promote and raise awareness of the co-operative model amongst students.

== See also ==
- The Co-operative Group
