= Association of British Credit Unions =

- Founded: 1984 (1967)
- Type: Industrial and Provident Society
- Location: Holyoake House, Hanover Street, Manchester M60 0AS
- Website: abcul.org

The Association of British Credit Unions Limited, commonly known as ABCUL, is the leading trade association for credit unions in Great Britain.

ABCUL represents around 70% of credit unions who in turn provide services to 85% of the British credit union membership. The Irish League of Credit Unions organises in Northern Ireland on an all-island basis. Both ABCUL and ILCU are members of the European Network of Credit Unions and World Council of Credit Unions.

== History ==
In 1967, Hornsey Co-operative Credit Union and other West Indian credit unions formed the Credit Union League of Great Britain, which became the Association of British Credit Unions (ABCUL) in 1984.

Separately, in 1964, Wimbledon Credit Union joined forces with two other credit unions operating from Roman Catholic churches in Highgate and Hove to form the National Federation of Savings and Co-operative Credit Unions; this later became the National Federation of Credit Unions (NATFED). The federation and the league agreed in 1967 to form a single national organisation, but the project never became reality and the federation continued separately until its dissolution in 2000.

In fact, the two bodies came to represent distinct factions within the early movement: ABCUL represented industrial credit unions exclusively, while NATFED affiliates were drawn from community credit unions. Furthermore, whereas ABCUL pursued a growth-orientated strategy of individual member unions achieving critical mass and market share, NATFED placed greater emphasis on self-help and expansion through the proliferation of smaller member unions.

The Ulster Federation of Credit Unions, which grew out of the Northern Ireland Regional Association of the National Federation in 1995, provides an alternative to the Irish League with a distinct Ulster British identity.

== Activities ==
In common with its member credit unions, ABCUL is registered under the Co-operative and Community Benefit Societies Act 2014. It is governed by a board of directors who are elected by the members.

The Credit Union Foundation Limited is a registered charity and a company limited by guarantee with a board of trustees consisting of the directors of ABCUL and independent trustees. As a registered charity, the Foundation's rules allow it to carry out a different but complementary role to that of ABCUL.

== See also ==
- Credit unions in the United Kingdom
- British co-operative movement
