= Credit unions in the United Kingdom =

Credit unions in the United Kingdom were first established in the 1960s. Credit unions are member-owned financial cooperatives operated for the purpose of promoting thrift, providing credit and other financial services to their members.

Credit unions in the UK now offer a wide range of services to their members; including current accounts, payroll deductions, standing orders and insurance.

Co-operative or mutual organisations engaging in cooperative banking, such as building societies, have existed in the UK since the 18th century.

== History ==
Institutions known as mutual societies grew out of the friendly society movement of the 18th century, with the first mutual insurer, Equitable Life, being founded in 1762. Formalised under the Friendly Societies Act 1819, mutual institutions predated the welfare state and were formed to meet the needs of a growing urban working class. This communitarian self-help movement allowed small regular individual contributions to be pooled for mutual collective benefit, obtaining the same economies of scope and scale necessary for providing insurance and financial products. Mutual societies helped to raise funds for housing and consumer durables at a time when commercial banks were still exclusively commercial lenders. Building societies were formed as small temporary societies by worker co-operatives, pooling resources to build local houses and subsequently allocating them among members by drawing lots. Once all members were housed, these organisations were typically wound up, although some became permanent societies in an effort to promote wider home ownership, as exemplified by the Leeds Permanent Building Society.

The first recorded credit union in the United Kingdom was formed in Derry, Northern Ireland, in 1960. Inspired by the formation of the first credit unions in the Republic of Ireland, six individuals pooled their savings and formally established the Derry Credit Union. In Great Britain, modern day credit unions emerged in the mid-1960s in London and Scotland. The first recorded British credit union was the Hornsey Co-operative, established 1964 in North London by Caribbean families, and is the foundation of what is now London Capital Credit Union. Credit unions were popular in the Caribbean and large numbers of first generation Caribbean-British would become members of credit unions. By 1998, 38% of Caribbean British adults were members of credit unions. In Scotland, several credit unions were established by immigrants from Ireland. In Glasgow, credit union coverage and membership remains broad: one in six Glaswegians is member of a credit union, with nine employee credit unions and 25 community credit unions serving the city.

The Credit Unions Act 1979 for the first time regulated credit unions in the UK. The Act required that all credit unions in Scotland, Wales and England register with the Registrar of Friendly Societies, who was responsible for ensuring that credit unions had a "satisfactory" common bond and adhered to common set of rules. The registrar was tasked with monitoring the activities of credit unions, who had to submit quarterly and annual returns to the registrar. The Act allowed the registrar to suspend a credit union's operations, strike credit unions off the registry and prosecute illegal financial activity by a credit union. In the years immediately following the passing of the Act, the number of credit unions increased significantly. In 1982, 73 credit unions were registered. From the late 1980s to early 1990s the registration of credit unions surged, increasing fourfold between 1987 and 1994. Between 1994 and 2000 a large number of small credit unions closed or merged with other credit unions. In 2000, 660 credit unions were regarded officially registered. A further 220 credit unions had failed to submitted their annual return to the Registrar.

In 1980, the first credit union was registered in Wales. The St Therese's Credit Union served the Catholic community living on a housing estate in Port Talbot. In the 1990s membership of credit unions in Wales grew as credit unions helped to deliver anti-poverty and financial inclusion policies in cooperation with local authorities and national charities. By 1997, 31 credit unions were registered in Wales. Following mergers between smaller credit unions the number of registered credit unions in Wales reduced to 26 by 2010. Between them the 26 credit unions achieve all-Wales coverage. According to Bank of England figures, the number of credit union members in Britain nearly doubled from 562,000 in 2004 to almost 1.04 million in 2012, while total assets increased from £432m to £956m. However, the number of active credit unions in Britain fell from 565 in 2004 to 390 in 2012. Some merged with rivals but others ceased trading, at least fourteen of them between January 2012 and July 2013.

== Regulation and policy ==
Credit unions in the United Kingdom have been regulated by the Prudential Regulation Authority for prudential purposes and the Financial Conduct Authority for conduct purposes since 1 April 2013, previously regulated by the Financial Services Authority from July 2002. Before the Credit Unions Act 1979 was passed, there was no special legal structure for credit unions in the UK. Some of the early credit unions chose to register under the Companies Act and some under the Industrial and Provident Societies Act 1965. They are classified in two types: type 1 are the smaller credit unions while type 2 are larger. From November 2006, many type 2 credit unions began offering their members debit card accounts so that they could withdraw cash from any Link ATM.

In June 2008, the Treasury announced plans to encourage the growth of credit unions by broadening the common bond and removing outdated restrictions, with the intention of significantly reducing the influence of door step lenders and loan sharks. Amendments to the Credit Unions Act 1979 were made by the Legislative Reform (Industrial and Provident Societies and Credit Unions) Order 2011 (SI 2011/2687), which came into force on 8 January 2012. The main changes were the removal of restrictions of membership to reach out to new groups by serving more than one group of people, provide services to community groups, businesses and social enterprises with specific business loans and to offer interest on savings, instead of a dividend, in line with mainstream banking.

Regulations for credit unions place a maximum interest rate on loans of 3% per month.

== Security of savings ==
Since October 2008 UK credit unions are covered by the Financial Services Compensation Scheme (FSCS), which protects savings in banks and similar institutions up to £85,000 (as of February 2017), covering about 98% of people; most members get their money back within a week.

Credit unions offer savers considerably more protection than commercial "savings clubs", as was demonstrated by the 2006 collapse of the Christmas hamper club Farepak.

== Recent changes in credit unions ==
In Britain the number of active credit unions fell from 565 in 2004 to 390 in 2012; some merged, but others became insolvent. Six ceased trading in 2012, and at least eight had ceased in 2013 by the end of July. However, the number of members has increased from 1.04 million in 2012 to 2 million in 2018.

Many credit unions are actively engaged in battling high interest payday loan organisations and loan sharks, offering an affordable credit alternative. In 2013 the Archbishop of Canterbury Justin Welby launched a Church of England plan to support credit unions, to combat the rise of UK payday lenders charging extremely high interest rates, which gave rise to much publicity.

== Comparison with building societies ==
| | Building society | Credit union |
| Mutual society? | Yes | Yes |
| Not for profit | Yes | Yes |
| Registration act | Building Societies Act 1986 | Credit Unions Act 1979 |
| Association | Building Societies Association (BSA) | Association of British Credit Unions (ABCUL) but also the BSA and others |
| Number | 42 | Around 250 |
| FSCS | Yes | Yes |
| Staffed by | Paid staff | Often volunteers |
| Require a 'common bond' | Sometimes | Always |
| Reward savers through | Almost always interest | Generally dividends |
| Generally invest in | Mortgages | Personal loans |
| Offer current accounts | Only Nationwide and Cumberland | Yes, through Vox, Engage, pre-paid cards etc. |

== See also ==
- British co-operative movement
- Banking in the United Kingdom
- Association of British Credit Unions (a trade association in mainland Britain)
- Irish League of Credit Unions (an all-Ireland trade association)
- Credit unions in Canada
- Credit unions in the United States
- List of European cooperative banks
