= List of NASCO member cooperatives =

Below is a list of cooperatives that are members of North American Students of Cooperation (NASCO). Members of NASCO are given services such as board and officer training, member training, networking opportunities as part of the connection to the co-op movement, and assistance on special projects. Currently, members span the contiguous US and Canada. An up-to-date directory of NASCO members can be found on their website.

== Members ==
=== US Members ===
State	Name	City	Website
California	Santa Barbara Student Housing Cooperative (SBSHC)	Santa Barbara	www.sbcoop.org/
California	Solar Community Housing Association	Davis	https://www.schadavis.org
California	University Cooperative Housing Association (UCHA)	Los Angeles	https://www.uchaonline.com/
Colorado	Boulder Housing Coalition	Boulder	boulderhousingcoalition.org/
Colorado	Picklebric	Boulder	https://picklebric.org
Iowa	River City Housing Collective	Iowa City	rchc.coop/
Illinois	NASCO Headquarters	Chicago	nasco.coop/
Illinois	Community of Urbana Cooperative Housing (COUCH)	Urbana	couchcooperative.org/
Illinois	Qumbya Housing Cooperative	Chicago	https://qumbya.com/
Illinois	Members of Society Acting in Cooperation (MOSAIC)	Evanston	mosaiccoop.org/
Illinois	Stone Soup Cooperative	Chicago	stonesoupcoop.org/
Illinois	Evergreen Cooperative	Chicago	
Illinois	Interfaith Community for Detained Immigrants	Chicago	https://www.icdichicago.org/
Indiana	Bloomington Cooperative Living (BCL)	Bloomington	https://www.bloomingtoncooperative.org/
Kansas	People's Owned and Operated Collected House (POOCH)	Lawrence	https://www.peopleshousing.org/
Maryland	Horizontal Housing	Baltimore	baltimorefreefarm.org/
Michigan	ICC Ann Arbor	Ann Arbor, Michigan	icc.coop/
Michigan	Kalamazoo Collective Housing	Kalamazoo	kalamazoo.coop/
Michigan	MSU Student Housing Cooperative (MSU-SHC)	East Lansing	msu.coop/
Minnesota	4th Street Co-op	Minneapolis	4thstreet.riverton.org/
Minnesota	Chateau Housing Cooperative	Minneapolis	chateau.riverton.org
Minnesota	Franklin Housing Cooperative	Minneapolis	franklin.riverton.org/
Minnesota	Marcy Park Co-op	Minneapolis	marcypark.riverton.org/
Minnesota	Marshall Housing Co-op	Minneapolis	marshall.riverton.org/
Minnesota	Riverton Community Housing	Minneapolis	riverton.org/
Minnesota	MATCH Co-op	Minneapolis	https://matchcooperative.wordpress.com/
North Carolina	Weaver Community Housing Association	Carrboro	wcha.coop/
New York	Bitternut Collective	Syracuse, New York	http://www.facebook.com/bitternuthomestead
New York	Nickel City Housing Co-op	Buffalo	nickelcitycoop.org/
Ohio	Oberlin Student Cooperative Association (OSCA)	Oberlin, Ohio	http://osca.wilder.oberlin.edu/
Ohio	Student Cooperative Organization (SCO)	Athens	https://sites.google.com/site/thevinecoop/
Oregon	Portland Collective Housing	Portland	https://www.facebook.com/PortlandCollectiveHousing/
Oregon	Student's Co-op Association	Eugene	https://eugenesca.com/
Pennsylvania	Central PA Community Housing	State College	http://houseasaurus.org/
Rhode Island	Providence East Association of Cooperative Housing (PEACH)	Providence	https://watermynpeach.wixsite.com/bachpeach
Tennessee	DeCleyre Cooperative Housing	Memphis	Official DeCleyre Tumblr
Texas	Community Housing Expansion of Austin (CHEA)	Austin	sasona.org/chea
Texas	College Houses	Austin	collegehouses.org/
Texas	Houston Access to Urban Sustainability (HAUS)	Houston	hausproject.org/
Texas	ICC Austin	Austin	iccaustin.coop/
Texas	Whitehall Cooperative	Austin	whitehallcoop.com/
Wisconsin	Madison Community Cooperatives	Madison	madisoncommunity.coop/

=== Canada Members ===
Province	Name	City	Website
Ontario	Waterloo Cooperative Residence Inc. (WCRI)	Waterloo	http://www.wcri.coop/

== NASCO Properties ==
NASCO Properties was established in the late 1980s to help NASCO become more directly involved in student cooperatives and permanent housing cooperatives. NASCO Properties is governed as a "co-op of co-ops", where representatives of each co-op within NP make decisions through their seats on the board on issues that relate to the entire NASCO Properties system.

Each co-op within NASCO Properties has its own mission, board, and budget, and local co-ops have complete autonomy over local policies, distribution of rents, membership criteria, and most other issues. NASCO Properties maintains financial reserves for local maintenance needs, potential vacancies, and expansion. NASCO Properties manages property taxes, insurance, major renovations, and trainings for the members of each participating co-op.

=== Properties ===
City	Associated Co-op	House Name	Year of Acquisition
Chicago, IL	Qumbya	Haymarket House	1989
Chicago, IL	Qumbya	Howard Bowers House	1991
Chicago, IL	Qumbya	Concord House	2000
Athens, OH	Student Cooperative Organization at Ohio University	The Vine Housing Coop	1990
Santa Cruz, CA	Santa Cruz Student Housing Cooperative	Zami!	1996
Urbana, IL	COUCH	Brooks House	1999
Urbana, IL	COUCH	Harvest House	2000
Buffalo, NY	Nickel City Housing Cooperative	Ole Wondermoth	2002
Buffalo, NY	Nickel City Housing Cooperative	Plankton House	2006
Austin, TX	Community Housing Expansion of Austin	Sasona Cooperative	2002
Austin, TX	Community Housing Expansion of Austin	La Reunion Apartment Cooperative	2013
Kalamazoo, MI	Kalamazoo Collective Housing	Fletcher Collective	2007
Lawrence, KS	University of Kansas Student Housing Association (UKSHA)	Sunflower House	2010
Lawrence, KS	University of Kansas Student Housing Association (UKSHA)	Ad Astra House	2010
Lawrence, KS	University of Kansas Student Housing Association (UKSHA)	Olive House	2010

== See also ==
- Fellowship for Intentional Community (website)
- US Federation of Worker Cooperatives (website)
- CHS (website)
- The Cooperative Foundation (website)
- National Cooperative Bank (website)
- Equal Exchange (website)
- List of condominiums and housing cooperatives in New York
