= Escher Cooperative House =

Coordinates: 42.2956°N 83.7251°W

Escher Cooperative House, named after artist M. C. Escher, is one of the Inter-Cooperative Council at the University of Michigan's (ICC) 16 student housing cooperatives. It is located at 1500 to 1520 Gilbert Court in Ann Arbor, Michigan. The only North Campus-located cooperative, it is the ICC's largest community with over 150 spaces of residents and 9 separately themed "suites." It is also the only building in Ann Arbor built specifically for cooperative housing.

== History ==
=== HUD loan ===
During the 1950s, the University of Michigan responded to post-war growth by developing North Campus, ensuring future demand for nearby student housing. The ICC persuaded the university to set aside three acres of a hilltop off Broadway for a "cooperative village." When the government made low-interest loans available in 1958, the ICC began planning in earnest. Due to the university's hesitation to co-sign, however, the project was delayed until Congress removed the co-signature requirement in 1964. The ICC finally procured a $1.24 million, 50-year low-interest loan from HUD for its North Campus project in 1968. This was the first-ever HUD loan to a non-profit student-owned housing program, marking a high point of student organizing at the campus which had already helped birth the 1960s student movement through the Students for a Democratic Society. According to Luther Buchele, the shaggy ICC delegation that traveled to Chicago to accept the loan underscored this unprecedented level of student activity:

One middle aged woman in the HUD office noted the long hair on John Atchaz, John Gourlay, Rex Chisholm, and Smokey Geyer. She said haughtily to me "This must be a delegation of visitors." "Would you like to loan a group like this a million dollars?" I asked. She answered, "I certainly would not!" I then informed her that HUD had indeed made such a loan and she looked sour.

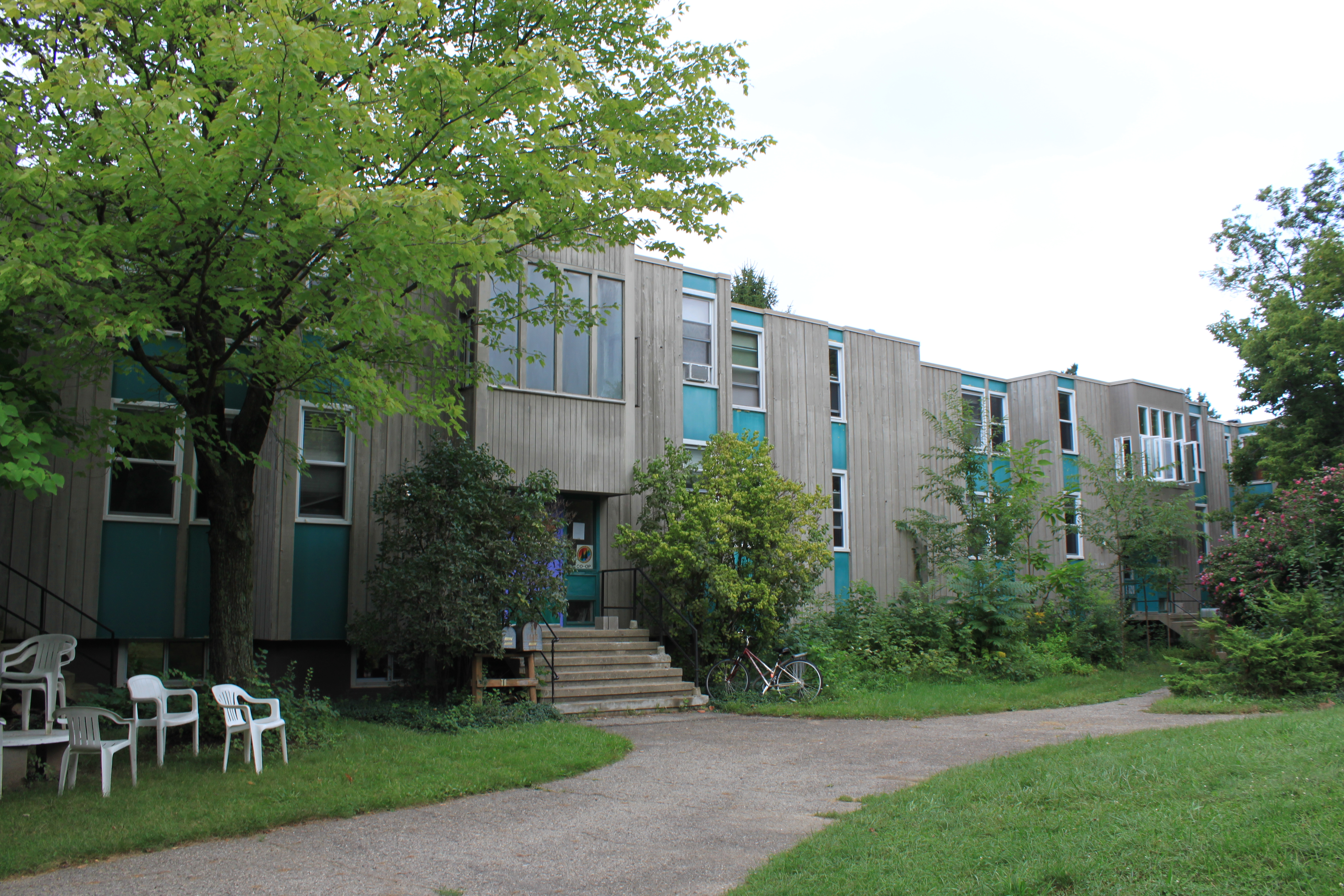
Escher Cooperative House

Tampold & Wells, an architectural firm that had designed co-ops at several Canadian universities, laid out a complex consisting of eighteen interconnected "houses" arranged around the crest of the hill the ICC had reserved. Although a fall 1970 opening had been scheduled, the building was not ready in time for the start of classes. Prospective residents slept on the floor at the adjacent fraternity house (now the Stearns Building) until the building was finished.

=== Nine houses ===
Despite the initial plans, it does not appear that the North Campus building ever functioned as eighteen separate co-ops. Instead, the planned eighteen were consolidated into nine "houses" making up the "North Campus Division" of the ICC. Each house had 24 members and its own treasurer, although co-op meals were shared in the two basement dining halls. The names of the houses reflected the social, political, and literary interests of members at the time: Sinclair was named for then-imprisoned Ann Arbor poet and activist John Sinclair, Russell for pacifist philosopher Bertrand Russell, Zapata for Mexican revolutionary Emiliano Zapata, and Bag End for the home of Bilbo Baggins in Tolkien's Shire.

=== Three houses ===
By the early 1980s, the North Campus co-op system showed signs of strain. To address rising vacancies and turnover, the board voted in 1984 to make the building's large rooms optional singles, instead of assuming that each would have two students. Despite this policy, the building effectively shut down for lack of members in 1985. Consultant Jim Jones, who had worked with other large houses at the Inter-Cooperative Council of Austin, attributed the problems to the limited time of the co-op population, which consisted almost entirely of graduate students. Jones also considered the administration of nine separate houses to be inefficient.

With the ICC Board, Jones oversaw the 1985 rebirth of North Campus as two houses: Renaissance and O'Keeffe. Each was organized around one of the two basement kitchens, similarly to the Austin College Houses model. Consolidating the nine co-ops into two may have saved the North Campus project from the unfortunate fate that befell other large student co-ops like Berkeley's Barrington Hall, although cultural factors may have also played a significant role.

The Board considered consolidating the building into a single co-op, but decided against it. Jones, noting that the North Campus building and old "North Campus Division" had been artificially "defined out of existence" as a cohesive whole, in 1987 proposed a new "third body" to represent the shared interests of all North Campus co-op residents on the board of the ICC. This entity became Escher House.

=== One house ===
Over the 1990s, and into the 2000s, Renaissance and O'Keeffe had distinct cultures. For a time, O'Keeffe meals had a vegetarian option (since O'Keeffe was the larger house) while Renaissance meals did not. Residents joked about the "Tofu Curtain" dividing the building just as the Iron Curtain had divided Europe. The increasingly expensive Ann Arbor rental market prompted a gradual increase in the number of undergraduate and international students at co-ops. The old problem of inefficient administration reared its head once more, as two separate teams of officers coped with peak occupancy.

In April 2014, Renaissance and O'Keeffe merged into Escher House via ratification of a new constitution. This document implemented changes based on lessons learned from a number of co-ops over many years. A single officer team replaced the previous two, a House Council was created for officer oversight, and a Judiciary Committee was introduced for hearing specific member appeals. Thanks to a policy exception granted by the ICC, Escher was granted three board members, ensuring North Campus residents' representation on the board was unchanged.

Today the two basement kitchens are still referred to as Renaissance and O'Keeffe, and the nine sections of the building that were once separate houses are now "suites" bearing the same names.

== Residence ==
In keeping with the geographical placement of Escher house, residents are primarily students from the schools of art & design, architecture and urban planning, engineering, and music, theatre, and dance. A large population of O'Keeffe consists of graduate students in the aforementioned schools as well as in other disciplines, although there are also long-time residents that have lived there for over two decades. However, a substantial portion of house members are undergraduate students. The house itself tends to be quieter than the other cooperatives on the University of Michigan's Central Campus, due to the older average age of members. The property is surrounded by acres of verdant property; wildlife such as white-tail deer, groundhogs, fox squirrels, skunks among others call the grounds home. Much of the land surrounding the House is owned by the University, however, and as of 2023, rapid development to the east of the House has commenced in the form of recreational fields and parking lots. There is a large recreational room where residents often watch movies, sing karaoke, play pool, have parties and play ping pong among other activities. There is an outdoor smoking area where members congregate in the non-winter months on weekends to go together to parties - mainly in other coops. There is also a bonfire area in the center area of the building where parties are held and other coop members often come.

== Suites ==
The house is composed of nine suites named after historical figures or literary works: Trantor Mir, Walden III, John Sinclair, Bag End, Emiliano Zapata, Valhalla, Bertrand Russell, Karma, and Falstaff.

Each suite houses approximately fifteen to twenty members, although the number may be lower during the spring and summer months when many of the university's operations slow significantly. Members' rooms are either "large singles" meant for a single occupant (originally a double room), double rooms, or small singles. Along with residents' rooms, each suite comprises a small kitchen and a lounge with television. Cats are allowed in 4 of the suites.

== Food ==
Escher employs its own private chef, with several members assisting her, to prepare dinner and provide lunch materials for members. GUFF (General Unspecified Free Food) food is available in the central kitchen twenty four hours a day, seven days a week. Vegan, vegetarian and omnivorous options are available at all meals and those with food allergies are accommodated. At the end of 2015, the members voted for meat-free Fridays.

== Cost of living ==
Money paid in exchange for living in the house are known as charges rather than rent, since members own shares in the Inter-Cooperative Council (and therefore a minute portion of their house) which then distributes money throughout the 16 cooperatives. Charges vary based upon such factors as gas, food, electricity and water prices, but typically run from $700–$1100 per month based on size of the room, whether one has a roommate, and the contract period signed for. There is a GUFF pile in the laundry room where members place unused clothing and other items to be freely taken by other members. Charges are all inclusive.

== Work ==
In addition to charges, each member is required to contribute time to the upkeep of the house. Work generally consists of cleaning or cooking tasks, and it is broken into 3 different units. Work for the house includes cooking, cleaning the basement or the kitchen, taking care of the grounds, and/or holding officer positions. "House labor" is expected to take three hours each week. Suite chores include vacuuming common areas, cleaning the suite kitchens, or serving as suite manager or on the house council (a group of suite elected people chosen to oversee house officers). This "suite labor" is expected to take around 30 minutes each week. The third division of labor is to clean hall bathrooms, which is split between the members living in the 4 or 5 rooms bordering the bathroom.
