= Student housing cooperative =

Nonprofit, communal and self-governing housing developments for enrollees at schools

A student housing cooperative, also known as co-operative housing, is a housing cooperative for student members. Members live in alternative cooperative housing that they personally own and maintain. These houses are designed to lower housing costs while providing an educational and community environment for students to live and grow in. They are, in general, nonprofit, communal, and self-governing, with students pooling their monetary and personal resources to create a community style home. Many student housing cooperatives share operation and governing of the house. As with most cooperatives, student housing coops follow the Rochdale Principles and promote collaboration and community work done by the members for mutual benefit.

Most student housing coops in Canada and the United States are members of North American Students of Cooperation.

== History ==
Several of the earliest US student cooperatives (e.g. at Northwestern University and Wellesley College) had begun by at least 1915, for the purpose of housing female students. Most student housing cooperatives are formed to provide an alternative dorm for students who are unable to afford college due to housing costs. For example, the Harriet E. Richards House at Boston University (1928) was established to provide a cheap alternative to dorm life for women scholars. The Berkeley Student Cooperative, amongst others, started during the Great Depression to help provide affordable food and housing for Berkeley students. Other early examples that started in the Depression years: the Cooperative Living Organization at the University of Florida in Gainesville, Florida founded in 1931 and the Michigan Socialist House at the University of Michigan in Ann Arbor, Michigan founded in 1932.

Others were formed to provide a more inclusive and supportive environment for students. Many student housing cooperatives are focused around socialist principles or political activism (Michigan Socialist House), veganism or vegetarianism, racial or ethnic identity (Biko), or environmental concerns.

Throughout the twentieth century, student housing cooperatives expanded, but some floundered. Many formed coalitions in the face of rising debt or bankruptcy. The North American Students of Cooperation (NASCO) was formed in 1968 as a way to link existing cooperatives together while educating and improving cooperatives across North America. Today, NASCO primarily serves as an association that promotes development and communication amongst coops and promotes communal living.

== Management ==
There is not a standard way of running a housing cooperative. Most student housing cooperative members have full voting privileges on issues such as rent, future members, and community activity and then maintain an elected board of committee members who oversee the running of the cooperative. Many student housing cooperatives require work shifts that help lower the overall cost of living. These may include chores or cooking. Some coops award points to the type of chore and members are required to complete a certain number of points a week. All cooperatives expect members to contribute assistance throughout the year to keep the cooperative running smoothly and efficiently. It is up to the individual coops as to whether the members elect a board or committee to oversee the entire cooperative.

== List ==
=== Australia ===
Two student housing co-operatives are presently operating in Australia:

- STUCCO Cooperative Ltd in Newtown, Sydney, founded in 1992
- Canberra Student Housing Co-op in Canberra, founded in 2010

=== Canada ===
Student co-operatives are situated in close proximity to colleges and universities. The biggest student housing co-operative in the world is Waterloo Co‑operative Residence Inc. in Waterloo, Ontario with 1300 resident members.

The East Coast is represented by:

- New Brunswick Residence Co‑operative from Fredericton, New Brunswick.

Central Canada is represented by:

- Educational Community Living Environment (ECOLE) in Montreal, Quebec
- Coopérative d'habitation étudiant Triangle Rose in Montreal, Quebec
- Campus Co‑operative Residence Inc in Toronto, Ontario
- Guelph Campus Co‑operative in Guelph, Ontario
- Waterloo Co‑operative Residence Inc. in Waterloo, Ontario
- Science ’44 in Kingston, Ontario

The West Coast is represented by:

- College Housing Co‑operative Limited in Winnipeg, Manitoba
- Common Ground Co‑operative in Winnipeg, Manitoba
- Assiniboia Community Housing Co‑operative in Edmonton, Alberta.
- Campus Residence Co‑operative Association in New Westminster, British Columbia

Many of the co-ops are members of The Cooperative Housing Federation of Canada and NASCO.

=== France ===
In France L’Association de Coopération pour le Logement des Etudiant·es de France (L'ACLEF), founded in 2015, exists to take on the management of empty properties to rent to students. L'ACLEF operates CoopColoc, housing students in Paris and Bordeaux alongside Campus & Toits in Toulouse.

=== Germany ===
There are multiple student housing co-operatives in Germany:

- Collegium Academicum in Heidelberg
- Schwesternhaus in Hannover
- Studentendorf Adlershof in Berlin
- Studentendorf Schlachtensee in Berlin
- Studierendenwohnheim des Karlsruher Instituts für Technologie (KIT) e.V. in Karlsruhe
  - Hans-Dickmann-Kolleg
  - Hans-Freudenberg-Kolleg
  - Insterburg
  - Kolleg-am-Ring
- Wohnheimsiedlung Massmannplatz e.V. in München

=== Switzerland ===
There is one operational student housing co-operative in Switzerland:

- La Ciguë in Geneva, founded in 1986.

=== United Kingdom ===
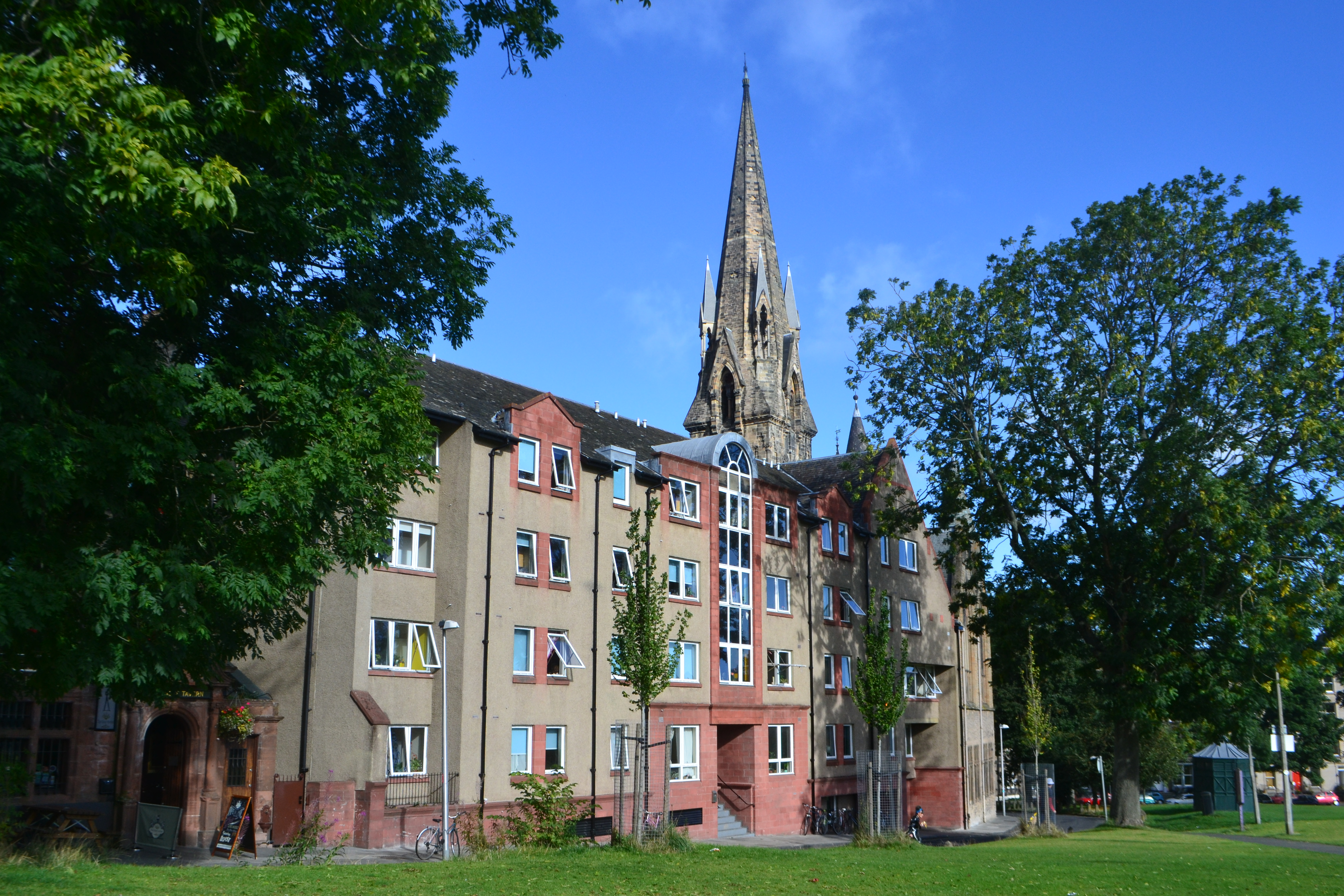
Edinburgh Student Housing Co-operative houses 106 members

There are four operational student housing co-operatives in the UK:

- Edinburgh Student Housing Co-operative with 106 members, opened 2014
- Birmingham Student Housing Co-operative with 9 members, opened 2014
- Sheffield Student Housing Co-operative with 5 members, opened 2015
- SEASALT (South East Students Autonomously Living Together) in Brighton with 7 members, opened 2021

There are also initiatives at various stages of development to establish housing co-operatives in Glasgow, Manchester and Bristol.

All operating coops and initiatives are members of Students for Cooperation, a UK wide federation of student co-operatives which includes a number of other groups across the UK working to establish student housing co-operatives. Students for Cooperation commissioned a report on establishing a National Body of Student Housing Cooperatives (NBSHC) to help support and grow the UK student housing cooperative movement. In 2018 this new body, Student Co-op Homes, was launched as a secondary co-operative for raising finances to buy property to lease to student housing co-operatives. The organisation has similarities to North American Students of Cooperation.

An unsuccessful plan to launch a student housing co-operative took place in 2004, when MMUnion partnered with the National Union of Students and Confederation of Co-operative Housing to offer cheaper cooperatively owned alternatives to city housing for Manchester Metropolitan University students. The NUS plan fell through as NUS management changed.

=== United States ===
Artist, student and community co-operatives are common in the San Francisco Bay Area. Many of these housing co-operatives are members of organizations such as NASCO.

Currently, the second biggest student housing co-op in the world is Berkeley Student Cooperative, formerly known as the University Students Cooperative Association, in Berkeley, CA with 1250 students living in 17 houses and 3 apartment complexes. Other large-scale co-op systems include MSU Student Housing Cooperative of Michigan State University, the Inter-Cooperative Council at the University of Michigan, and UCLA University Cooperative Housing Association with 400+ students.

Other examples of such cooperatives include:

- Berkeley Student Cooperative in Berkeley, California
- Bloomington Cooperative Living in Bloomington, Indiana
- Brown Association for Cooperative Housing in Providence, Rhode Island
- College Houses (e.g. 21st Street Co-op) and the Inter-Cooperative Council at the University of Texas at Austin
- Cornell Cooperative Housing at Cornell University
- Dudley Co-op at Harvard University
- Genesee Valley Cooperative in Geneseo, New York
- Harriet E. Richards House at Boston University, in Boston, Massachusetts.
- Kalamazoo Collective Housing in Kalamazoo, Michigan
- The University of Kansas Student Housing Association in Lawrence, Kansas
- Cooperative Housing at the University of Maryland in College Park, Maryland
- Student Housing Cooperative at Michigan State University
- University of Minnesota Students Co-op and Riverton Community Housing in Minneapolis, Minnesota
- Minnesota Students' Cooperative in Saint Paul, MN
- Students' Co-Op at the University of Minnesota
- The Oberlin Student Cooperative Association at Oberlin College
- Penn Haven Housing Cooperative at University of Pennsylvania
- Cooperative Housing at Purdue at Purdue University
- Qumbya in Chicago, Illinois
- Santa Barbara Student Housing Cooperative in Santa Barbara, California
- Santa Cruz Student Housing Co-ops in Santa Cruz, California
- Cooperative Houses at Stanford University
- Stewart Little (cooperative housing) in Ithaca, NY
- The Tri Co-ops and Baggin's End/Domes in Davis, California
- Two Dickinson Street Co-op in Princeton, New Jersey.
- University Cooperative Housing Association at UCLA
- Inter-Cooperative Council at the University of Michigan
- Community of Urbana Champaign Cooperative Housing in Urbana, Illinois
- Students' Cooperative Association in Eugene, Oregon
- The Cooperative Living Organization in Gainesville, Florida
- Helyar House at Rutgers University in New Brunswick, NJ
