= Bower (Co-op) =

Bower House
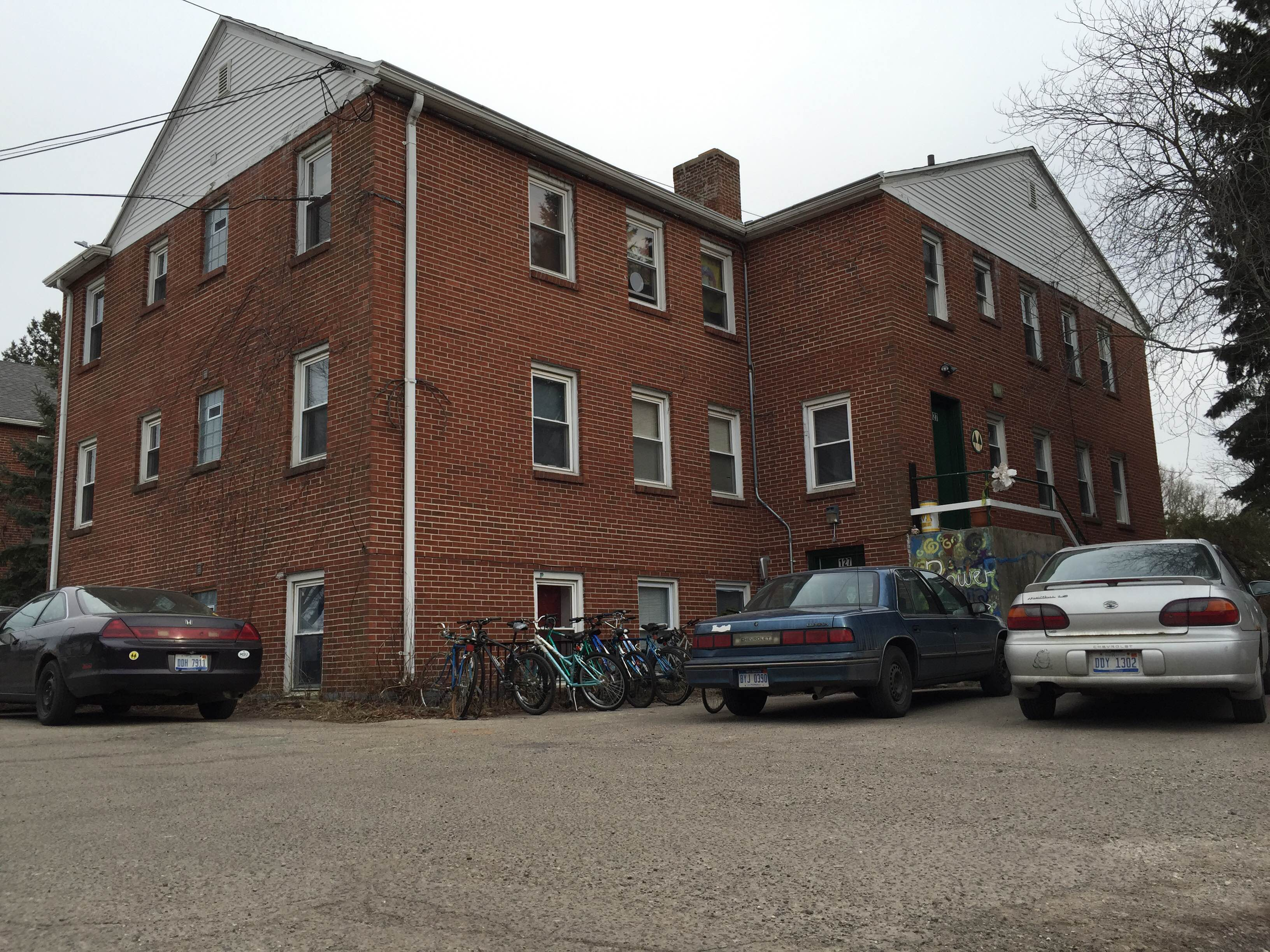
- Interactive map of the Bower House area
- Former names: Vlach-Bower

General information
- Type: House
- Location: 127 Whitehills Dr East Lansing, Michigan, 48823
- Coordinates: 42°44′43.4″N 84°28′57.9″W
- Owner: MSU SHC

Bower is a student housing cooperative located in East Lansing, Michigan, USA, and a member of the Student Housing Cooperative at Michigan State University. The house has been operating as a co-operative since 1947, and as an active member of the MSU SHC since 1971. It is well known for having a strong history of eco-friendly action and activism.

== History ==
The house was founded in 1947, and named after Bob Bower who was killed during World War II. At the time, Bower was primarily a co-op for war veterans. It remained an all men's house until the 1960s when Vietnam veterans began to occupy the house.

In 1971, Bower joined the SHC and went on to become known as one of the most vegetarian, and vegan-friendly houses in the MSU SHC. The house is also well known for being very environmentally aware through its eco-friendly recycling and shopping habits, as well as a fair amount of activism that has been channeled through the house.

== Structure ==
Bower house has three floors, seven bathrooms, a living room, dining room and kitchen. In 2015, Bower had 19 occupants; however the City of East Lansing permits up to 24 occupants. The front yard contains an organic garden, as well as an outdoor compost.
