= Waterloo Co‑operative Residence Inc. =

Student housing cooperative in Waterloo, Ontario, Canada

Waterloo Co-operative Residence Inc. (WCRI) is a non-profit student housing cooperative located in Waterloo, Ontario, Canada. It is owned by its residents, also known as members, who attend the University of Waterloo, Wilfrid Laurier University, and Conestoga College. The co-op is governed by the Rochdale Principles.

WCRI is significant in the history of the North American co-operative movement as it would expand to become the largest student housing cooperative on the continent. As of 2024, the co-op can accommodate over 1300 residents in its 13 dormitories and apartments, making it the largest organization of its kind in North America.

WCRI was a founding member of the Ontario Student Co-operative Association and the North American Students of Cooperation.

== History ==
WCRI was founded in July 1964 as the Waterloo division of Toronto's Campus Co-operative Residence Inc (CCRI). Engineering student Richard Rowe had lived in one of Toronto's Campus Co-op houses during a 1963 work-term, and returned to Waterloo with a plan to duplicate the co-op model in Waterloo. Rowe organized a meeting via the Student Christian Movement, and recruited 24 students as paid members of the new co-op. In collaboration, the group bought a boarding house on University Avenue, along with a smaller second house across the street. Initially, the two separate houses on University Avenue in Waterloo accommodated twenty-seven male and nine female students, though meals were taken together at the men's house. One cook was hired, but all other work was done by the members. There was much greater demand than space available. By November 1965, the organization had 140 members in 10 houses and a residence under construction. WCRI also added a house at 59 Albert Street.

Initially, the adjacent University of Waterloo was not in favour of the co-operative. Wilfrid Laurier University held a similar view, refusing to host posters advertising its existence. However, the success of the Waterloo model would help to inspire a wave of Canadian student co-ops, funded under the Canada Mortgage and Housing Corporation’s student housing program (then named the "Central Mortgage and Housing Corporation).

Independence from CCRI was soon deemed desirable and the process of splitting off into a separate co-op was undertaken. Letters patent for the incorporation of WCRI were issued on November 8, 1965.

By September 1966, more than 200 students lived in various WCRI accommodations. In addition to owning several houses, the co-op had built a four-storey dormitory called Dag Hammarskjöld Residence, the first such building in North America to be built, owned, and operated by students. Construction had been accomplished under a new federal funding regime, via the Canada Mortgage and Housing Corporation. At this point, full-time staff were beginning to be hired to handle various administrative matters. The three floors of "Hammar" were named after the Freedom Summer murder victims, Chaney, Goodman and Schwerner.

Despite some debt, plans were drawn up to build four more three-storey buildings on 2.5 acres of land that WCRI acquired at 280 Phillip Street. A $2.5 million mortgage was secured, and construction began early in 1968. The co-op sold the last of its houses in 1976. In 1986, the co-op invested $6.5 million to develop a 94-unit apartment complex, consisting of three buildings. In 1993, an apartment basement space was converted into the Weaver's Arms Pub, the first student-owned pub in Canada.

In 1993, WCRI owned 12 buildings and had assets of more than $15 million. At that time it was one of three Ontario student housing co-ops that offered to lend money to The Triangle Housing Co-op, which was started in 1990 by students from Concordia and McGill universities, the Universite du Quebec a Montreal, and the Quebec Public Interest Research Group. The WCRI loan was contingent upon the Quebec students also securing a mortgage from a local caisse populaire, and a mortgate guaranteed from the Canada Mortgage and Housing Corp.

In 2003, the City of Waterloo reclassified the WCRI lands at 280 Phillip Street as Residential (from Industrial).

By 2006, WCRI had 972 members and was the largest student co-op in Canada, the second largest in North America.

During the Covid-19 pandemic, WCRI rented the 105-bed Dag Hammarskjold residence to the Region of Waterloo as short-term accommodations for people experiencing homelessness. The site was funded by the region and allowed people to keep physically distant from others while also offering food, harm reduction supplies and support to find permanent housing.
