= Student Housing Cooperative at Michigan State University =

Spartan Housing Cooperative (SHC) is a nonprofit member owned and operated housing cooperative. The SHC was formed as in 1969, as a federation of existing student housing cooperatives in East Lansing. Since the first of the SHC's member houses formed 69 years ago, SHC has accumulated more than 4,000 members.

== Houses ==
The Spartan Housing Cooperative currently maintains 18 houses in East Lansing, Lansing, and Okemos.

=== Current Houses ===
- New Community
- House of Apollo (previously Avalon)
- All Nations
- Beal
- The David Bowie Memorial Cooperative
- Hedrick
- Howland
- Toad Lane
- Miles Davis
- Orion
- Phoenix
- Raft Hill
- Harambee
- The Shire
- Rivendell
- Vesta
- Bower
- Zolton Ferency

^{#} In 1971, the MSU SHC became a collective land trust with donations of property from Bower, Elsworth (Bowie), and Hedrick cooperatives.

=== Houses No Longer A Part of the SHC ===
- Atlantis
- Eleutheria (located at 125 Evergreen Street, it was destroyed by fire in June 1972)
- Hillsdale House Cooperative

== A Chronological History of the SHC Houses ==
1939 to 2024
Year	Event
1939	Hedrick co-op established at 415 Abbott
1940	Elsworth co-op established at 218 Albert
1941	Hedrick members purchase the house at 903 East Grand River
1944	Bower purchased in the summer at 708 E. Michigan State University
1946	Motts Co-op established; Ulrey men's co-op established
1947	Bower co-op established
1948	Howland co-op established; All Nations co-op established; Hedrick repopulated at 903 East Grand River
1949	Beal Street co-op established
1950	All Nations co-op closes; Elsworth sells 218 Albert, the members build 711 W. Grand River
1954	Hedrick co-op on 903 E. Grand River burns down
1956	Hedrick co-op rededication at 140 Haslett (now Collingood) by MSU President Hannah
1963	Howland co-op buys 548 M.A.C.
1964	Hedrick co-op purchases 146 Haslett (later to be Farency co-op)
1969	SHC forms as a federation of Bower, Elsworth and Hedrick; Ulrey Men's co-op closes, starts up Ulrey Trust Fund; Ulrey Women's co-op starts up at 437, 445 Abbott
1970	Eleutheria co-op established (rental property); Evergreen co-op established
1971	SHC becomes a collective land trust; Motts house closes, members move to 420 Evergreen (aka The Raft)
1972	The Raft is renamed Knight House co-op; Eleutheria destroyed by fire; Ulrey Women's co-op established at 505 M.A.C.; Eleutheria and Ulrey repopulate Nexus; Nexus established at 437/445 Abbott; Evergreen co-op sold to local apartment building owner's, Phunn: Bogue Street co-op rented at 207 Bogue.
1973	Haslett Street becomes Collingwood; 501 M.A.C. purchased (potentially new housing for Nexus or new Comm)
1974	Tralfamador co-op established at 501 M.A.C.
1975	Knight House renamed Major Raoul Lufberry; Phunn House purchased at 207 Bogue
1976	445 Abbott sold to a sorority; 152 Collingwood purchased as a part of Hedrick; Nexus closes at 437 Abbott; Phoenix established at 437 Abbott
1978	New Community: 415/425 Ann Street is purchased
1979	Phoenix closes at 437 Abbott
1980	Major Raoul Lufberry closes; SHC obtains a $1 million HUD loan for: Woodside (910 Abbott, a co-op for a year), New Community rehabilitation, Key Largo established at 146 Collingwood, and Atlantis
1982	Atlantis repopulated at 207 Bogue; Ulrey repopulated at 505 M.A.C.
1985	Elsworth co-op close, rented to [Asher Christian Scientists]; Ulrey renamed Zolton after Zolton Ferency at 505 M.A.C.
1986	146/152 Collingwood break away, renamed Key Largo
1987	Elsworth at 711 W Grand River rented to Sigma Alpha Mu (SAMmies); 146/152 Collingwood split; 152 Collingwood rented Asher Christian Scientists; 146 Collingwood becomes Key Largo
1988	501 M.A.C turned into a graduate co-op
1989	501 M.A.C. reopened to general membership
1991	Miles co-op established 152 Collingwood
1992	SAMmies expelled and repopulated as an Elsworth at 711 W Grand River
1993	Zolton closes at 505 M.A.C.
1994	Phoenix established at 239 Oakhill; 415 Ann repopulated as a co-op (Toad Lane); Key Largo renamed Ferency after Zolton Ferency
1995	Audre Lorde renamed Niko co-op
1996	Tralfamador changes its name to NASA; Elsworth closes from Summer until the Fall
1997	NASA renamed Orion
1998	Bower repopulated by Atlantis, Elsworth, Hedrick, Miles, and Orion; Alliance between SHC and Circle Pines formed; SHC grants Sigma Pi exclusive rights to Phoenix co-op
2000	Phoenix repopulated by SHC, Sigma Pi moves to Niko
2001	Niko (Sigma Pi) renamed Shadowood
2002	Sigma Pi leaves Shadowood and leaves the SHC; Shadowood repopulated and renamed Mosier
2005	Atlantis was purchased in 2005 following the sale of the Atlantis Co-op on Bogue Street. Atlantis had been sold in anticipation of the City of East Lansing’s plan to exercise eminent domain for the Cedar Village area development project.
2009	SHC acquires the independent co-op Beal House after the residents were unable to pass city inspection or pay their taxes
2020	SHC buys 131 Whitehills from Jim Jones, an apartment style property neighboring Bower house
2024	131 Whitehills, now known as All nations finishes remodeling and starts accepting members

== A Brief History of Campus Cooperatives ==
Some of the earliest student co-ops in the United States were established around the turn of the century. In Austin, Texas, and in Gainesville, Florida, students began by providing themselves with meal plans. These programs eventually led to early housing co-ops.

These co-ops continued, observing and participating in the rise of the Cooperative League of the USA (CLUSA), and weathering the First World War and the Red Scare of 1919. As the twenties came to an end and the Great Depression set in students, like most people in the US and Canada, were barely able to get by. However, the co-op activist and religious leader Toyohiko Kagawa provided the nation's students with a renewed vision of social and economic cooperation. With the spark of Kagawa's enthusiasm, the 1930s saw the establishment of such long-standing co-ops systems as those in Berkeley, California; Ann Arbor, Michigan; and Toronto, Ontario.

The Second World War slowed much of the momentum of this period; many co-op members were drafted for the war effort. However, the end of the war, with the introduction of the GI Bill, saw new demands for student housing and the establishment of co-op systems in Ithaca, New York; Oberlin, Ohio; and Lincoln, Nebraska.

The late forties also saw the first attempt at a national student co-op organization: the North American Student Cooperative League (NASCL). Although quite successful at first, NASCL lost its major funding source, CLUSA, who cut support in the mid-fifties.

In the sixties, the political fervor over the free speech movement and the antiwar movement brought new enthusiasm to student cooperatives, this time as a social and political alternative to the postindustrial capitalist system. Government support in the form of low-interest housing loans in the US and Canada also contributed to the new boom in student co-ops. In 1968, the new NASCL, the North American Students of Cooperation (NASCO), was formed. Since that time, NASCO has served as the main networking and support system for student co-ops.

== See also ==
- North American Students of Cooperation

https://www.nasco.coop/sites/default/files/srl/Hasten%20Slowly%20-%203%20Chapters.pdf
