= Cooperative Living Organization =

Housing cooperative in Florida, US

Coordinates: 29°39′11″N 82°20′29″W

- Formation: 1931
- Type: Housing cooperative
- Headquarters: Gainesville, Florida
- Location: United States
- Website: Official website

Cooperative Living Organization (CLO), formerly Collegiate Living Organization, in Gainesville, Florida, is one of the oldest continuously operating independent student-governed cooperative living organizations in the United States. The 89-year-old organization has provided over 2000 financially disadvantaged students an opportunity for a University of Florida education while providing experience in independent and socially responsible living by pooled resources and self-governance.

== History ==
CLO began in the depression year of 1931 with four Tallahassee, Florida boys who pooled their meager resources in order to remain enrolled in the University of Florida. They rented a garage apartment near the campus sharing housework and expenses. Their shared expenses came to $13.00 a month per person. Rapid expansion of the group to 23 members and the rental of two houses led to formal organization and the election of officers in 1933.

Two policies were formulated that underpin the organization to the present. First, individual financial contributions would be set by democratic rule for the least cost compatible with comfortable living conditions. Second, those who could afford to live elsewhere, non-students, and students whose primary objectives were social association rather than academic achievement through cooperative living were excluded from membership. Criteria for judging applications for membership were financial need, potential for scholastic achievement, leadership qualities and willingness to work as a group for the common objectives.

By 1938 the membership increased to 64 and in 1940, Dr. Joseph Fulk, a former professor of School Administration at the University of Florida, placed the present property at 117 N.W. 15th Street, Gainesville, Florida in trust with CLO as the beneficiary in memory of his deceased wife, Nellie Swanson Fulk. The organization incorporated as the Cooperative Living Organization, Inc. and expanded to as high as 80 members assessing $22.50 per person per month for room and 3 meals per day. Except for the World War II years, membership remained steady at that level. Member contributions rose to the $50 range per month in the '60’s and the organization supported three employees, a full-time cook and assistant, and a part-time accountant in addition to compensation for its elected officers.

In February 1967, CLO was reincorporated under the name of the Collegiate Living Organization in order to comply with a previously unnoticed law which disallowed the use of the word "cooperative" in the name of any corporation not associated with the agricultural industry. At this time the organization adopted a non-discrimination policy. In 1968 the organization was the first off campus living organization including social fraternities and sororities at the University of Florida campus to accept African-American students. Under the leadership of CLO alumni Frank Shepherd, architect Jack Turner and enthusiastic support of the University of Florida President and administration, a successful movement to acquire funds through a HUD loan for new buildings resulted in replacement of the wood and brick houses historically referred to as the "Brown House," "White House," "Brick House," and "Chow Hall" with modern concrete buildings with capacity for up to 80 residents. These new buildings were completed in the early 1970s. It was also in the early '70s when women began to be admitted as members. On April 7, 2009 CLO returned its name to Cooperative Living Organization.

== Governance ==
Throughout its over 75-year history, CLO has been governed internally solely by its members through a model democratic system spanning policy, admissions, maintenance of the physical plant, fiscal and disciplinary issues outlined in its Charter and By-Laws.

Since inception the role of the University of Florida administration in governance of CLO has been largely advisory as provided for in the property deed placed in trust with the Florida Board of Control, and later the Florida Board of Regents as trustees. University of Florida administrations have on average restricted interaction to an advisory role respecting and promoting the independent mission of the organization. UF president Stephen O'Connell, for whom the Stephen C. O'Connell Center was named, took a more active supportive stance during the 60s and 70s by helping CLO acquire a low-cost student housing loan for construction of a new facility. Periodically, changing UF administrations have taken a more patronizing "in loco parentis" role toward CLO and in the most extreme instances attempted to actively assume control and management of the organization and its property.

As early as 1947 the University of Florida Dean of Students attempted to take control of the fiscal management of the corporation declaring that since CLO was composed of students, the University had full jurisdiction over operations. CLO was able to enlist the help of the Florida State Attorney General’s office who stood behind the independent status of the organization as a corporation in the State of Florida.

In February 2006 under the assumption that it was the sole responsible trustee of CLO property, the University of Florida Office of Student Affairs attempted to seize control of the property by shutting down CLO operations. This was on the grounds that students were no longer capable of independent maintenance of the physical plant, citing several safety violations. They also tried to say that the cooperative’s mission was irrelevant with respect to the average social and financial status of modern students of the University of Florida. The move caused an international response from CLO alumni, friends and families of graduates facilitated by internet communication in solidarity with current members of the organization. This response resulted in a court-mediated agreement between the University of Florida and CLO members and alumni. The proceedings were tracked closely by local newspapers, The Gainesville Sun and the University of Florida student paper, The Independent Florida Alligator, whose editorials generally supported the position of the historic student organization. During this period the CLO Alumni Foundation (CLOAF) was organized and was appointed trustee of the property with CLO as its continued beneficiary. The CLO Alumni Foundation was incorporated in 2006 as a tax-exempt, non-profit entity in the State of Florida and provides a more active advisory and financially supportive role than previously provided by the University of Florida while protecting and perpetuating the original mission. CLO is a member of the North American Students of Cooperation.
