= Tofu Curtain =

Cultural or socioeconomic divide in Western Massachusetts

Tofu Curtain is a nickname for a cultural or socioeconomic divide between two geographic regions and the people who reside in them, with the concept of tofu symbolizing certain lifestyles and political leanings. The term was coined in Massachusetts to identify trends on either side of a county line in the Pioneer Valley along the Connecticut River, and has also been widely used similarly with regards to gentrifying neighborhoods in Melbourne, Australia. While the Tofu Curtain most often refers to these specific regions of Victoria and Western Massachusetts, other tofu curtains have been named along similar socioeconomic, educational, ideological, political and/or ethno-racial divides in various locations around the globe.

The term derives from the political and ideological Iron Curtain that separated communist Eastern Bloc countries from Western Europe during the Cold War. The insertion of "tofu" into the phrase asserts that a high proportion of vegetarians reside on one side of the divide, and associates left wing politics with vegetarianism.

== Locations ==
=== Western Massachusetts ===
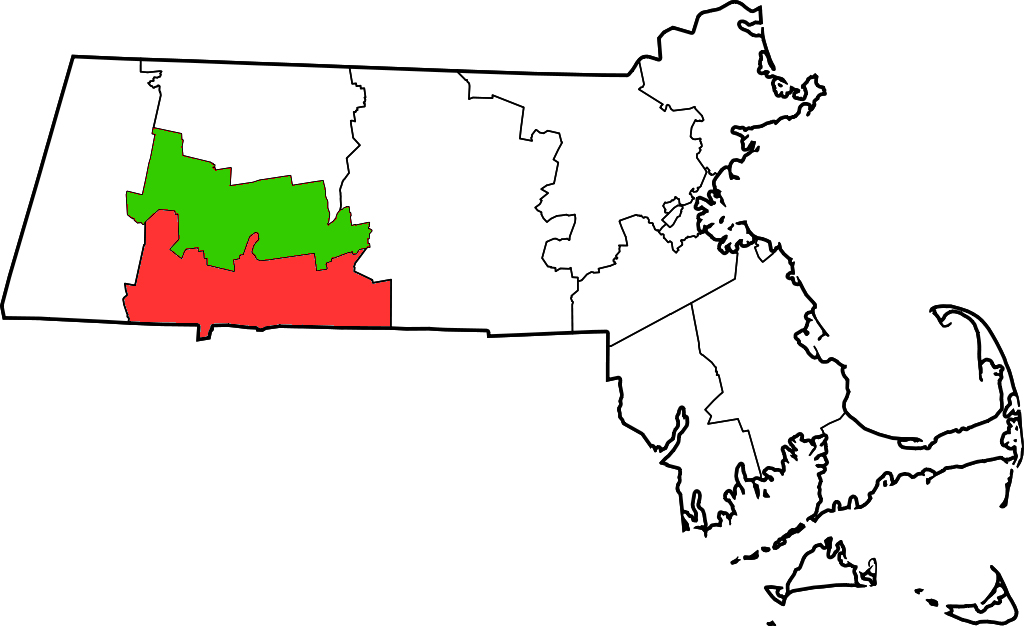
A map of the U.S. state of Massachusetts highlighting two of its counties in the Pioneer Valley; Hampshire County appears in green, Hampden County in red, with the Tofu Curtain tracing the line between them.

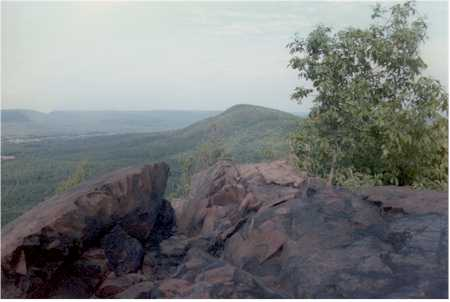
View of the Holyoke Range from Bare Mountain

The line of the Tofu Curtain in Western Massachusetts runs roughly east–west along the Holyoke Range. To the north is wealthier Hampshire County, home to the Five College Consortium of Amherst, Hampshire, Mount Holyoke and Smith Colleges, and the University of Massachusetts. To the south is Hampden County, comprising the mostly working class cities of Holyoke and Springfield, and their surrounding towns. While this southern part of the Massachusetts' Pioneer Valley is the second largest metropolitan region in the state, areas of it are economically depressed, with a deficit of available jobs and significantly lower household incomes. Meanwhile, the more rural and collegiate areas to the north are home to a preponderance of worker cooperatives and small businesses that often manufacture and sell natural products (such as tofu) to a more affluent population. The term was applied to this region of Massachusetts as early as 2006.

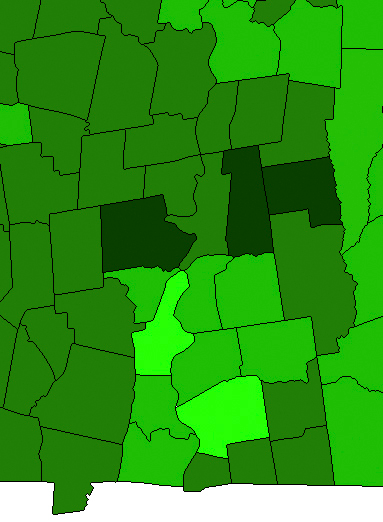
2015-2016 SAT scores by town with the clear contrast between the north and west of the Metacomet Ridge and the Greater Springfield area, illustrating disparate educational outcomes

While the Tofu Curtain's distinction is based on U.S. Census data and the repute of the two counties on either side of the Holyoke Range, their demographics are not absolute. Hampshire County being framed as "more collegiate" than Hampden either ignores the presence of the nine additional colleges and universities in the Springfield metropolitan area's Knowledge Corridor, or regards these educational institutions as inferior to those of the Five College Consortium. In addition to being populated by some more affluent residents and college students, economic disparities exist within Northampton, resulting in neighborhood rifts on that side of the Tofu Curtain. Despite the presence of a wealthy college and huge university, an estimated 30-40% of students in the Amherst-Pelham school district qualified for free or reduced lunches in 2017 due to living in low-income households.

Likewise, Hampden County's large working-class and Puerto Rican populations have been active in community organizing and progressive politics, activities often associated with the culture of the college towns to the north. The assertion that there is a Tofu Curtain has also been a rallying point for people living and working on both sides of the county line to create equitable systems of food sovereignty, workplace democracy, and environmental justice as means to destratify the region economically while uniting it politically. In a 2022 interview with WRSI radio, Emily Brewster of Merriam-Webster called the Tofu Curtain "an imagined line" that can be "problematic" and "over-simplifying" in its attempts to define a region and its people.

=== Elsewhere in the United States ===
People use the term "tofu curtain" to describe a similar sociopolitical phenomenon outside of Western Massachusetts. Likewise, the term is used pejoratively by those opposed to a liberal political position. The term "tofu curtain" can also be used to describe an ideological situation, as opposed to a specific geographic area. In a 2003 essay, Paul Gilroy described a political speak-out on a university campus and used the term "tofu curtain" as a metaphor for petty factionalizations among different strains of student activism:

As peace rallies proliferate, the campus left will have to tear down the tofu curtain and dig itself out from underneath the wreckage of identity politics so narcissistic and short-sighted that it reproduces the political solipsism and imperialistic indifference that are usually associated with power and privilege.

Similarly, the Inter-Cooperative Council at the University of Michigan has used the term "tofu curtain" to refer to a dietary split between vegetarians and meat-eaters among its members. At one point an agreement among the co-ops made the split geographical, marked by a particular corner in Ann Arbor with all co-op houses on one side having "veggie" and on the other side "carnie" kitchens. The Ann Arbor co-ops were using the term as early as 1984.

=== Australia ===
In Australia's 2016 federal election, voters south of Bell Street in Melbourne's northern suburb of Brunswick voted overwhelmingly for the Green Party and those to the north went for the Labor Party. While the neighborhoods that voted Labor still lean left politically, they tend to be more working class, and the gentrified neighborhoods of Brunswick and North Melbourne went Green. The split helped nickname Bell Street as Melbourne's own Tofu Curtain. In 2018 Australia's fossil fuel industry took advantage of the nickname by volleying the term pejoratively in attempts to divide Green Party and Labor activists from organizing together against expansion of coal mining and gas drilling. Other nicknames for Bell Street and the sociopolitical split it represents have proliferated in Melbourne, including "The Corduroy Line," "The Latte Line," "The Great Wall of Quinoa," and "The Hipster-Proof Fence", evoking Australia's famed "rabbit-proof fence" of the early 20th century.

=== Asia ===
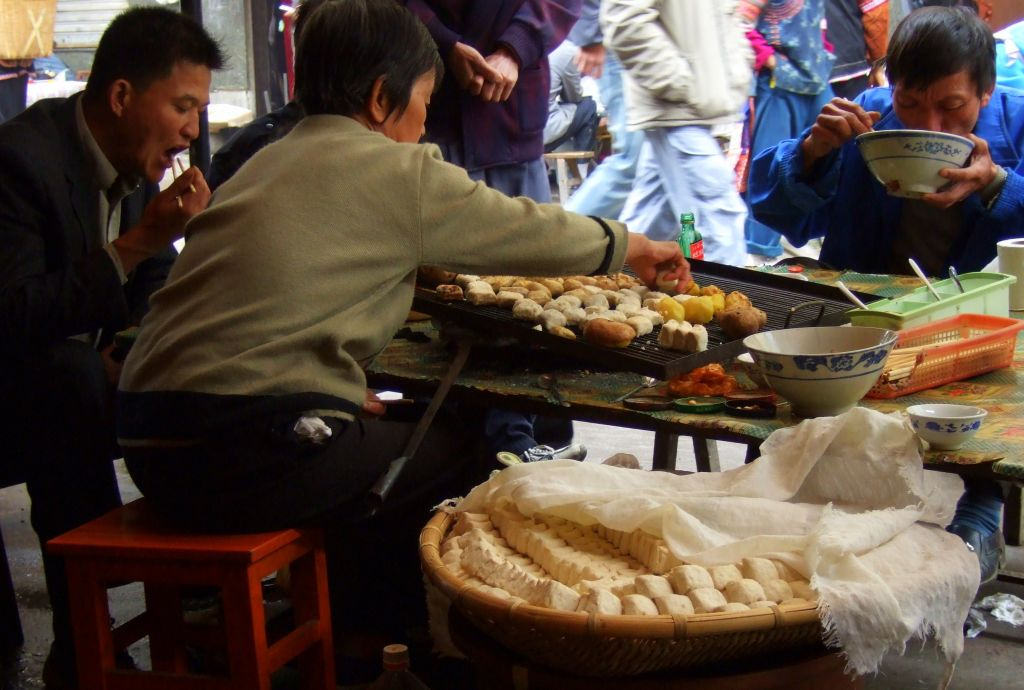
Tofu and potatoes grilled, served and eaten at a street stall in Yunnan, China

Because tofu originated in China, Japan, Korea, and other regions of East Asia, the term "tofu curtain" has also described differences between Eastern and Western culture. A 2007 study conducted by the United Nations's Food and Agriculture Organization showed that in one year China consumed nearly 100 times more soybeans per person than the United States, while the Japan-to-U.S. per capita rate of soybean consumption was more than 200-to-1. That same year, the Food and Agriculture Organization Corporate Statistical Database revealed that South Korea's soy consumption rate fell about midway between Japan's and China's. 2013 data showed these proportions to be about the same, with Taiwan consuming the highest amount of soy foods per capita, at a rate 15% higher than that of Japan's. Unlike in the United States and Australia, tofu in East Asia is a dietary staple and is not associated with particular political parties, movements, or factions.

== In other media ==
In September 2016 Western Massachusetts residents launched TofuCurtain.com, a site for "Satire and Commentary in the Pioneer Valley." Among the site's earliest stories were "Recent Graduate Will Shave, Cut Hair After Finding Job," "WikiLeaks Release Reveals Town of Hadley Extremely Boring," "Hampshire College Replaces American Flag with 'For Sale' Sign," and "New Privilege Checkpoint at Coolidge Bridge raises Traffic Concerns." By the end of 2018, the website no longer existed.
