= New Community (Co-op) =

Housing cooperative

- Interactive map of the New Community area

General information
- Type: House
- Location: 425 Ann St, East Lansing, Michigan, 48823
- Coordinates: 42°44′09.4″N 84°28′42.0″W

Website
- http://msu.coop/new-community

New Community (New Comm) is a housing cooperative located in East Lansing, Michigan, and is a member house of the Spartan Housing Cooperative (SHC). New Community was founded as an independent cooperative in 1969 and was officially incorporated into the SHC at 425 Ann Street in 1987. Though the New Community housing cooperative has undergone a series of property and management changes, it remains a staple of cooperative living in the region.

== History ==
Started by a group of radical cooperators in 1969 who wanted a less structured living style, the group, which called themselves New Community, began renting houses in the late 1960s. The New Community properties were designed to be a counterculture, utopian experiment for students at Michigan State University. The New Community Cooperative joined the newborn Student Housing Cooperative in 1972. New Community as it is currently known, located at 425 Ann Street, was officially incorporated as a housing cooperative of the SHC on June 24, 1987.

The original property of New Community's on Albert Street was moved to M.A.C Ave. to make way for a Marriott Hotel. The SHC rented a property at 437 Abbott, a location of several previous co-ops (such as Nexus and Phoenix), which became the new location for New Community in 1979.

With money from a HUD loan in 1980, the SHC eventually purchased properties at 415 and 425 Ann Street to provide housing for New Community members. The properties split a year later, and New Community became exclusively located at 425 Ann. The SHC operated 415 Ann Street as a rental property until 1995 when it became an incorporated five-member co-op known as Toad Lane.

New Community served as the official Honors College co-op from 1997 until 2004 but has since returned to open membership. In 2010 and 2011, the residents engaged in home improvement projects to repaint several rooms, remove old carpet, and refinishing wood floors to instead have tile installed in the first-floor bathroom and hallways.

== Current House ==
New Community is currently located at 425 Ann Street on the corner of Division Street, two blocks north of Michigan State University's campus. The house contains seven single resident bedrooms and four double resident bedrooms. The house is most commonly referred to as "New Comm."
