= Baggins End =

Student housing at the University of California, Davis

Coordinates: 38°32′36″N 121°45′53″W

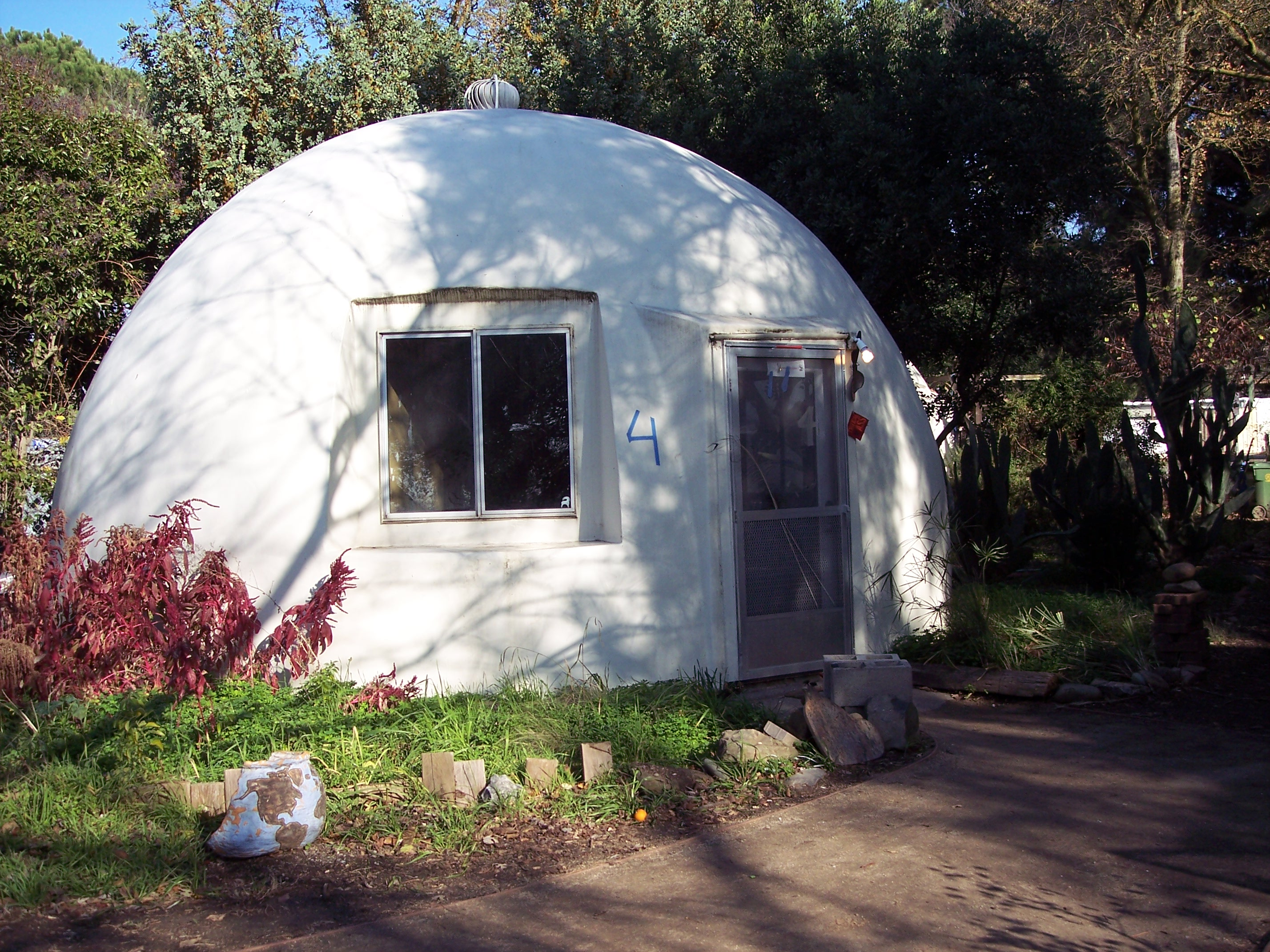
A dome. Each one houses 2 residents

The Baggins End Domes, also known as The Domes or the Davis Domes, are a student housing cooperative at the University of California, Davis built by students in 1972. They are part of the Sustainable Research Area which includes the Student Farm and the Experimental College Gardens. Inspired by Buckminster Fuller, there are 14 domes, featuring painted fiberglass-shell exteriors, the insides of which were coated with sprayed polyurethane foam, and "core-walls" with a kitchen on one side and a bathroom on the other. On January 25, 2011, an announcement was made by Student Housing that no new leases will be granted for the following academic year. The Sustainable Living/Learning Task Force with faculty and students was initiated to investigate options.

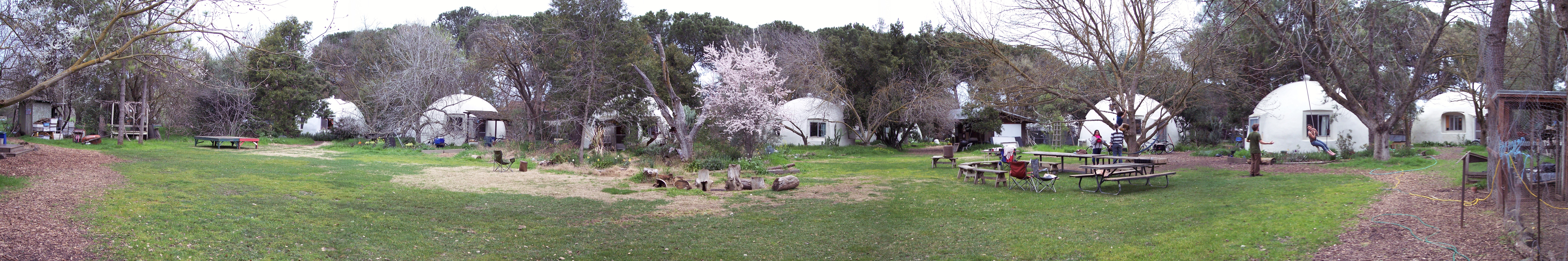
Panoramic view of domes and common areas.

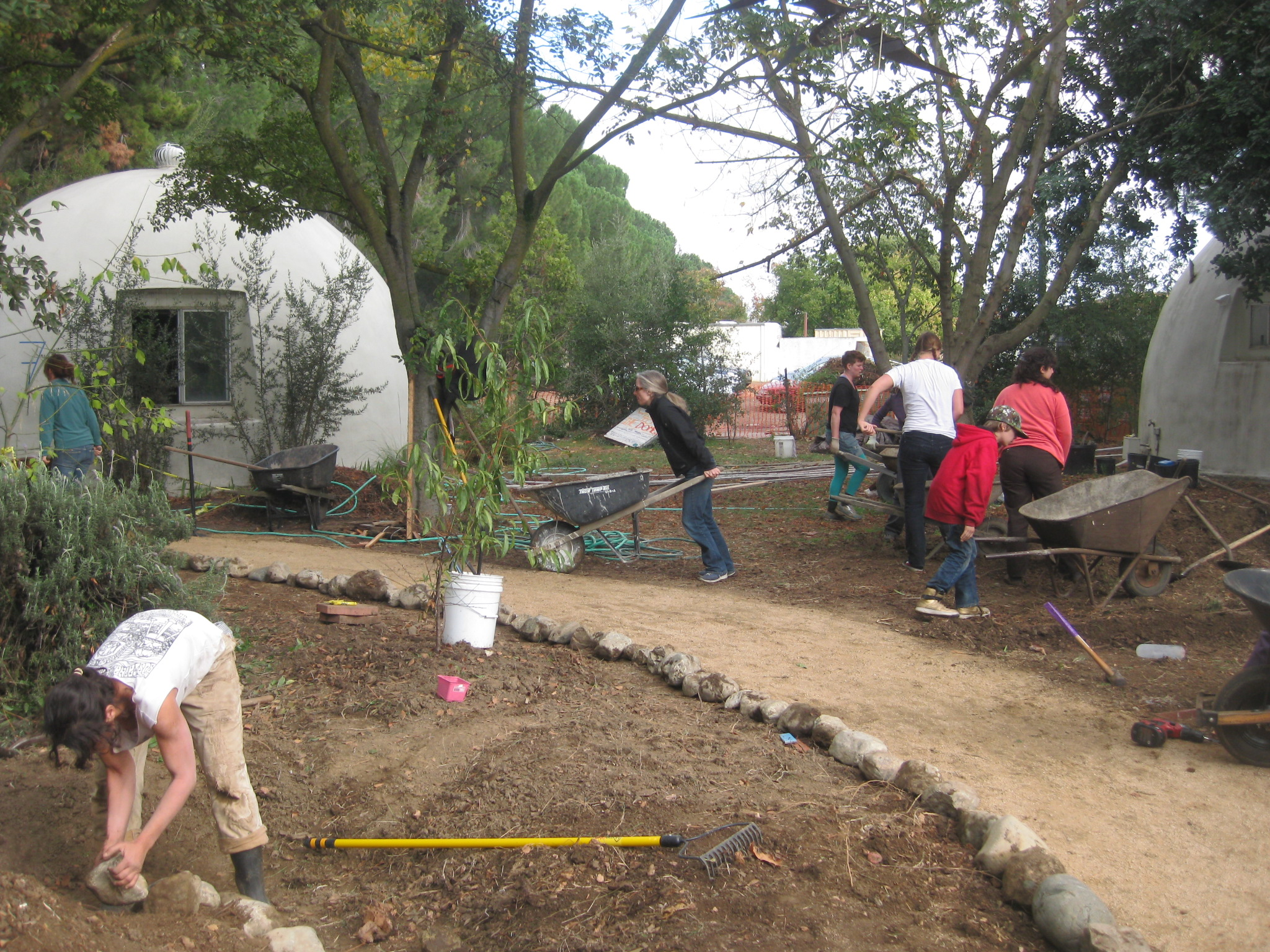
Domes restoration project in 2011.

Domes residents, also known as Domies, ended up collaborating with the Solar Community Housing Association (SCHA) cooperative in Davis, California. SCHA and Domies raised money to repair the domes and lobbied the university to transfer management of the Domes to SCHA. A community build event was held on November 3–6, where hundreds of volunteers performed the majority of the work, which included creating wheelchair accessible pathways and gardens, building new railings, and patching foam.

SCHA signed a ground lease with UC Davis at the end of December 2011, 14 new Domies moved into 7 of the domes at the start of January. The work was continued through July 2012.

UC Davis holds photo archives of the Domes between the years of 1972-1997, which are accessible to the public.

At full capacity, the Domes house approximately 26 full time UC Davis students. As of October 2026, approximately only 12 of the 14 original domes are presently occupied by students. 2 are presently under renovation.

Each Dome is numbered numerically between 1 and 15. A communal "yurt" is located closely nearby (established in spring 2008), where SCHA staff and "Domies" alike reside and attend to related affairs within the wider organization.

Like the other properties throughout SCHA, the Domes have each of their residents volunteer in an assigned "committee", which discuss matters throughout the organization, ranging from financial liability to governance.
