= Stucco Co-operative =

Student housing co-operative in Sydney, Australia

Coordinates: 33.89501°S 151.18697°E

Stucco Co-operative Ltd
- Type: Student housing cooperative
- Founded: February 21, 1992; 34 years ago
- Headquarters: Sydney, Australia
- Revenue: 257,122 Australian dollar (2023)
- Total assets: 1,678,853 Australian dollar (2023)
- Members: 40
- Website: stucco.org.au

STUCCO Housing Co-operative is a student housing co-operative in Sydney, Australia. Officially opened on 21 February 1992, it was the first of its kind in Australia, though there is now also the Canberra Student Housing Co-operative. Its name is a contraction of "Student Co-operative" rather than a reference to the rendered coatings on the external brickwork in the STUCCO building.

== History ==
The Co-operative is located on the heritage-listed former F. W. Gissing glass factory at 197-207 Wilson Street Newtown, New South Wales. While adaptively reused as student housing, the building retains its architectural integrity as a recognisable former factory. With its surviving Federation and inter-war features, industrial character, consistent building form of brick bays and parapet walls and three street frontages, the building makes an important contribution to surrounding streetscapes. The building is a distinctive feature of Wilson Street, which is visible from a number of near and distant vantage points.

It is a 40-member Housing Co-operative made up of both undergraduate and postgraduate full-time students of the University of Sydney who hold Australian citizenship. Stucco regularly holds charity events such as art exhibitions, live music performances, discussion groups, and parties. Stucco also allows community groups to utilise the space for their own events and has had the pleasure of hosting groups such as The Beautiful Minds Project, the Solidarity Choir, and Adventure Time. Stucco has been able to support not-for-profit, activist and charity organisations such as Refugee Action Coalition and the Redfern Tent Embassy, utilising its resources and space to benefit the community.

== Stucco Solar Project ==
In 2015, the City of Sydney Council afforded Stucco an "Environmental Performance Innovation Grant" to help Stucco create the first multi-unit residence to achieve a unified solar panel and battery network in Australia.

The solar system is a test case and demonstration of solar–photovoltaic and battery storage installation in the context of multi-unit residences. The system holds 114 panels and 36 batteries, producing 30 kWh with storage capacity for 42.3 kW.

The project was managed by Louis Janse van Rensburg and Bjorn Sturmberg, both former residents of Stucco, with media and publicity handled by Sarah King (2016 President of Stucco).
