= MOSAIC (housing cooperative) =

Coordinates: 42°3′14.7″N 87°40′55.4″W

MOSAIC's logo

Members of Society Acting in Cooperation (MOSAIC), also known as MOSAIC Co-op, is a housing cooperative in Evanston, Illinois, United States. It is the only housing co-op serving Northwestern University students, though it is not affiliated with the university.

MOSAIC was formed in 1998 and was originally located at 2013 and 2015 Ridge Avenue. In autumn of 2004, MOSAIC relocated to 2000 Sherman Avenue in a house known as the Zooo. MOSAIC expanded to a second house, called the Treehouse, located at 1427 Elmwood Avenue in September 2015. As a result of the COVID-19 pandemic, MOSAIC closed the Zooo in July 2021, making the Treehouse the only remaining home for MOSAIC.

The co-op draws its membership from students of Northwestern as well as non-students. Members are committed to limiting environmental impact on the community and providing vegetarian/vegan cuisine. MOSAIC frequently hosts Northwestern student group activities, as well as its own events, such as open-mic nights and crafting workshops.

MOSAIC is a member of NASCO.
