= 21st Street Co-op =

Student housing cooperative in Austin, Texas

Coordinates: 30.28388°N 97.74564°W

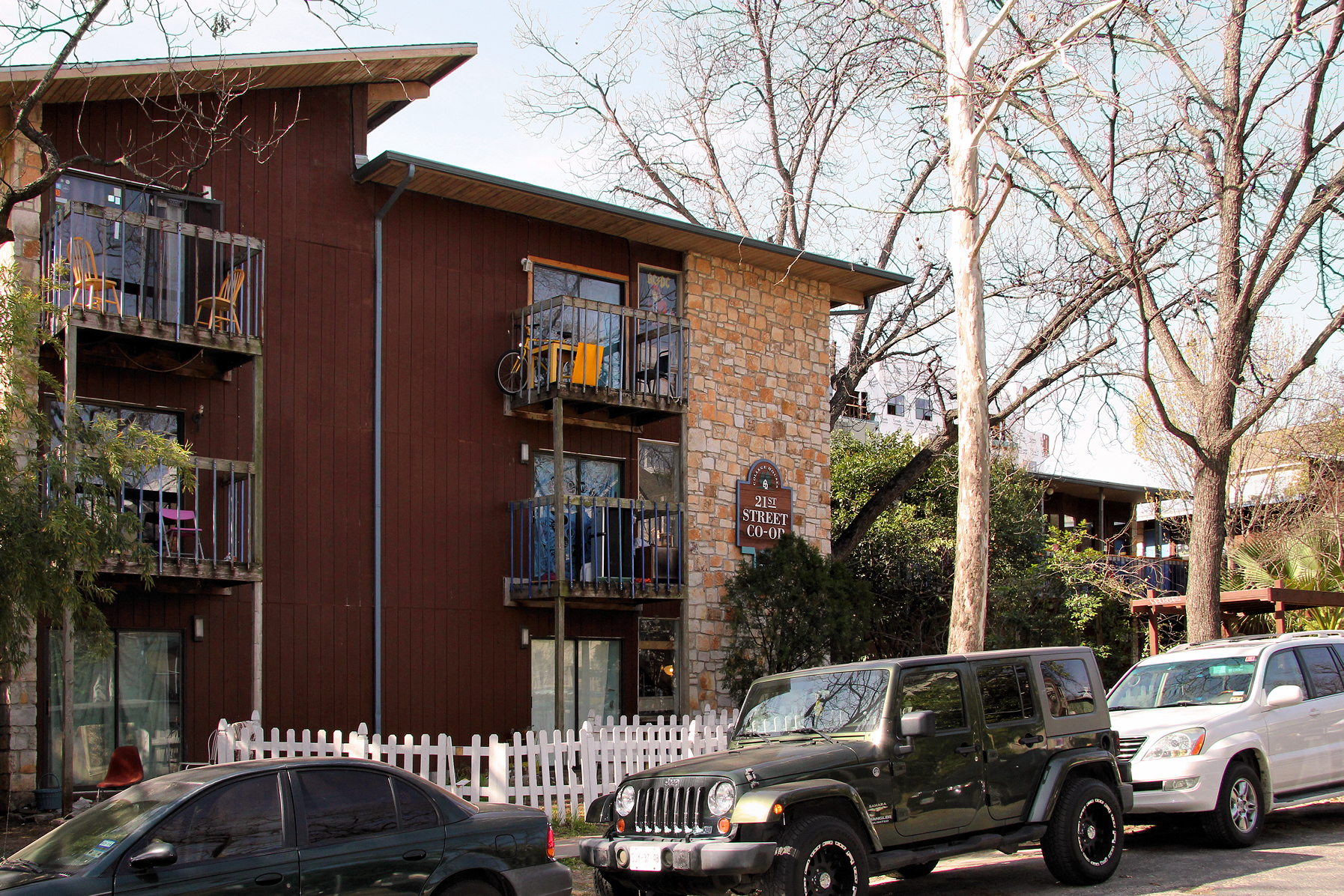
21st Street Co-op

The 21st Street Co-op is a student housing cooperative in Austin, Texas housing 100 residents. It is part of the College Houses co-op system.

Located at 707 West 21st Street, the house is just a few blocks west of the University of Texas at Austin campus and Guadalupe Street (the Drag). The 21st Street Co-op offers a combination of suites, walkways, balconies and landscapes.

== History ==
The five new buildings of College Houses were still under construction in August 1974 prior to the fall semester. William Tamminga, a popular Austin architect of the 1970s, designed and built the complex. The funding was provided by a loan from the United States Department of Housing and Urban Development (HUD). Michael McHone, now a local real estate developer, was primarily responsible for securing the funding.

One hundred contracts for new members were signed and dropped off at the College Houses, Inc. offices located in the Ark Co-op. The Ark was 21st Street Co-op’s “big sister”, located 50-yards away. Room and board contracts were originally $245 per month for a single room and $135 for a shared room.

With the fall semester of 1974 about to begin, all of the inaugural members began showing up, but the buildings were still far from being ready. Contracts had been signed, so College Houses, Inc. rented some rooms at the former Brownstone Apartments as temporary housing. The Brownstone was half a mile away, six blocks north on Rio Grande.

Cold breakfast was available at the Brownstone. For almost two months everyone had to travel to the Ark for main meals. There were as many as 225 co-op residents coming to the Ark for dinner. Menus typically consisted of a vegetable, a salad, potatoes or pasta, a meat dish or meat substitute, and a dessert. Textured vegetable protein (TVP) was introduced as a cost-cutting measure.

In early November 1974 the buildings were officially opened. This day was celebrated at 21st Street Co-op and is typically celebrated on the third Saturday of November. This event is often referred to as "Birthday" by residents of the co-op.

The buildings were mostly dark red cedar with bright blue trim and many windows. There wasn't any landscaping. The walkways and stairs were very slippery and caused several accidents. They were later treated to increase traction.

Closets had not been designed into the rooms due to budget constraints, so College Houses, Inc. contracted Foursquare Furniture to build heavy particle board units to use as closets. It was left up to the co-op residents to assemble them, paint them and install them in each room.

There have been various injuries and a fatality at the co-op over the years. One of the third-floor decks collapsed in 1987, seriously injuring three residents. During the 1980s, a resident working on the roof was stung by a bee. He went into a panic and fell off of the roof, and did not survive.

Solar collectors were installed on the rooftops. As with the Ark and later Taos, a soda machine was modified to sell beer. This was strictly illegal and never approved by the TABC. In fact, there was much panic in the mid-1980s when a TABC agent's son became a member of the co-op. At 25¢ a bottle, it became necessary to make it an official house job to keep the money-making machine full. No such machine exists at the co-op presently.

== Community structure ==
=== Labor ===
The co-op runs on a labor system. Each resident of the co-op does four hours of labor per week coordinated by the Labor Czar. Cooking, cleaning, and general house maintenance are a few examples of labor. Labor keeps the cost of living down as members fix and maintain the house themselves. Residents with a desire to invest themselves more into the co-op may run for officer positions.

When the 21st Street Co-Op opened there were initially three jobs available to residents. The Menu Planner reviewed the menus that each cook submitted and determined what food supplies were needed. The Kitchen Manager ordered the food and kitchen supplies and oversaw kitchen operations. The Accountant collected rent and maintained the treasury. Residents who filled these positions received a substantial reduction in their rent but were still responsible for weekly labor assignments.

== House structure ==
=== Suites ===
The 100 members share furnished private and double rooms joined into small suites. Lofts are common in rooms. Each suite includes a common living room, kitchenette, semi-private baths and floor-to-ceiling windows opening out onto the front and back yards.

=== Other areas ===
The "Commons" is an area on the second floor of 21st COOP where both touring and local bands perform for parties.

== Culture ==
=== Fire dancing ===
Members of the house maintain a tradition of fire dancing. Dancers use fire poi, fire staffs, and fire hula hoops among other unique tools. Major performances occur on special occasions.

=== Labor Holiday ===
Labor Holiday is an internal co-op event that occurs every semester on a weekend decided upon by the house through its house meetings. During this event, members are typically assigned to work 4 hours of labor during the weekend. Members are allowed to choose what labor they do and are encourage to suggest labor projects to be done during Labor Holiday. The co-op will typically also provide its members a large amount of food with members determining whether to cook the food themselves or to order catering. Labor Holiday is an essential event for the co-op as it allows for large scale projects to occur such as the co-op bike shed.

=== Co-op Birthday ===
Co-op Birthday occurs every fall semester and is the largest party put on by the 21st Street Coop, and one of the largest parties in Austin, generally attracting thousands of guests. The party is to celebrate the birth of the co-op. The co-op invites all previous 21st street alumni in a sort of co-op reunion with older members and current members. Co-op birthday festivities include a large meal served to 21st members and alumni, a large party that typically runs from 9pm - 2am, a fire-spinning dance involving all current and past dancers, and culminating with members being on the roof until sunrise.

=== Other parties ===
21st hosts many other parties throughout the year as their main means of fundraising. Parties at 21st typically have a posted cost ranging from $7 - $20, depending on the event in question. While these parties may have previously sold alcohol in the past, current parties are dry, with alcohol only being provided to current residents over the age of 21. These parties often contract many bands, who play music within the commons. The money raised is then typically used for repairs, appliance purchases, and other maintenance.

== Sources ==
- Many Hands: A History of the Austin Cooperative Community Library book link
