= Michigan Cooperative House =

American co-op house

Coordinates: 42.2835°N 83.7412°W

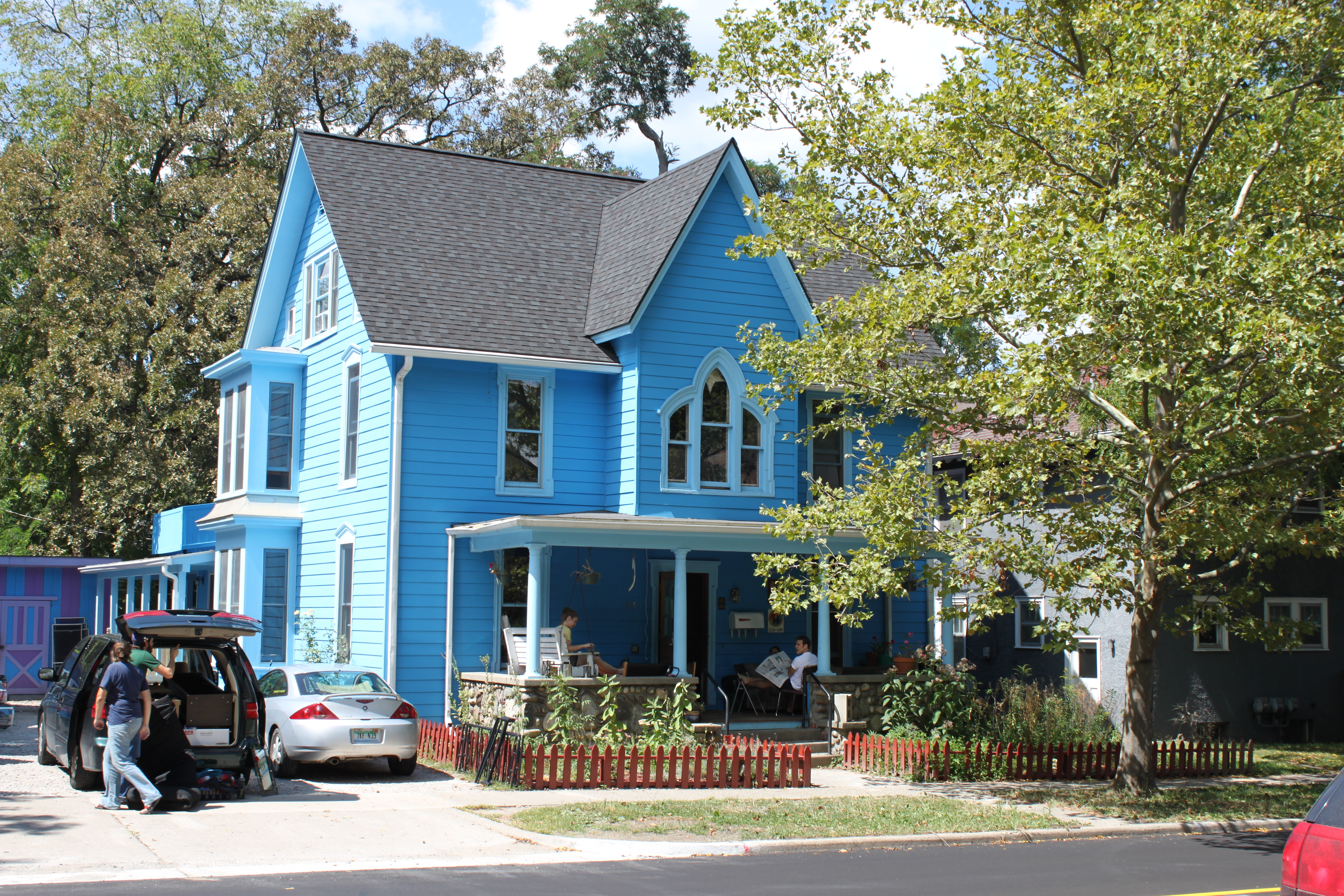
Michigan Cooperative House

Michigan Cooperative House was founded in 1932 as Michigan Socialist House. It was located at 335 E. Ann Street in Ann Arbor, Michigan, near the University of Michigan campus, and now is located at 315 N. State Street. It is one of the co-op houses making up the Inter-Cooperative Council. In 2016 Michigan Cooperative House and the neighboring Minnies Cooperative House voted to combine the two coops and become one functioning, democratically run cooperative.

== History ==
Michigan Socialist House was founded in 1932 by a group of students in the University of Michigan Socialist Club as an experiment in putting socialist values into practice and a way to defray the costs of living for students during the Great Depression. Throughout the 1930s, the members of Michigan House managed to provide themselves with full room and board for only two dollars a week, making headlines. In 1939, the members of the house voted to change the name to Michigan Cooperative House, though many people still refer to it by its original name.

Today, Michigan Cooperative House continues to provide housing, food and community living for students and non-students in Ann Arbor.

== Minnie's Cooperative House ==
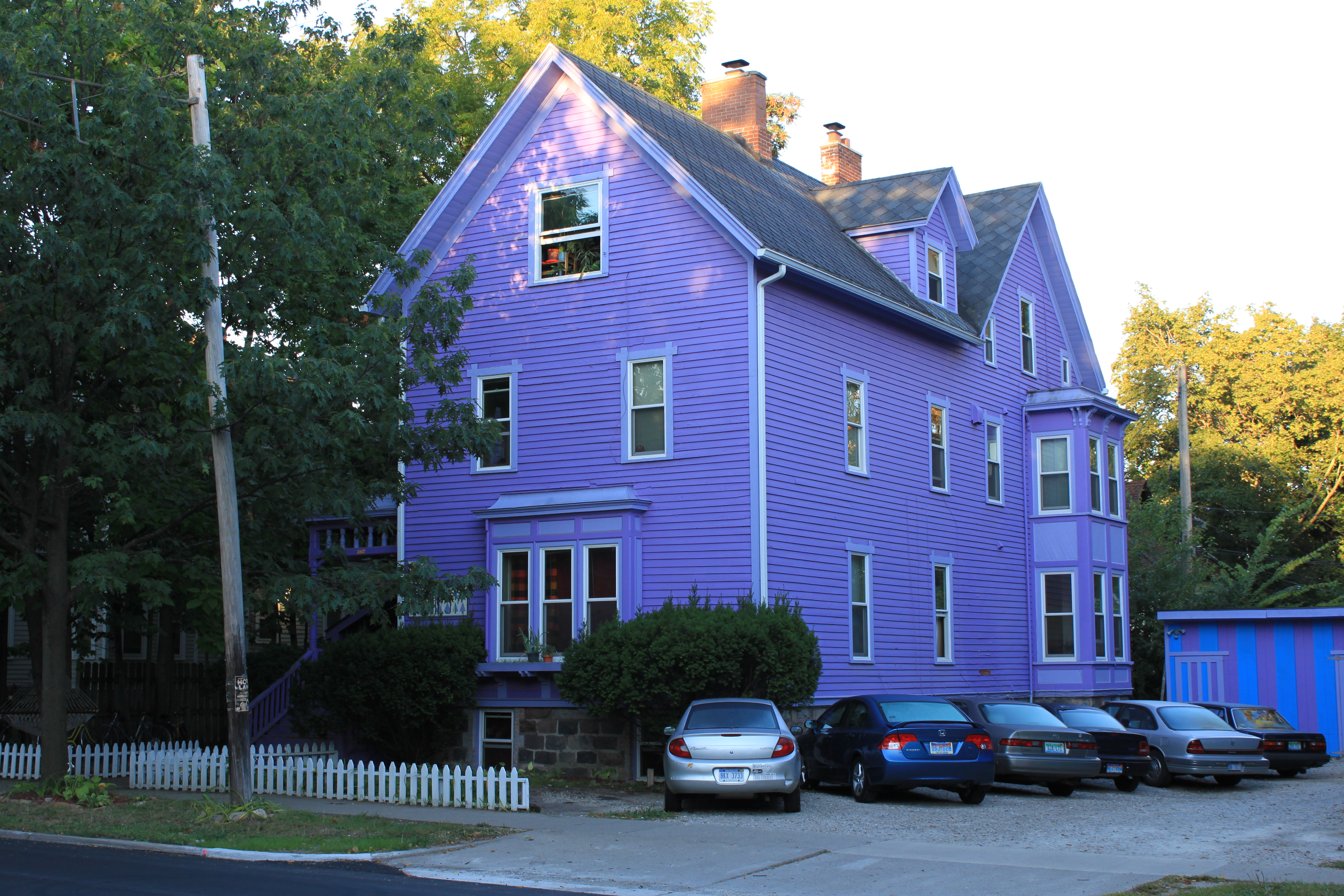
Minnie's Cooperative House

Michigan Cooperative's functions are intertwined with its neighboring co-op house, Minnie's Cooperative. The two houses used to be technically two distinct co-ops, functioning as one unit, sharing meals and many aspects of their house cultures. They combined into a single cooperative under the name MichMinnies.

== See also ==
- North American Students of Cooperation
