= Community of Urbana-Champaign Cooperative Housing =

Coordinates: 40.11036690°N 88.21378790°W

Community of Urbana-Champaign Cooperative Housing, or COUCH, is an association of housing cooperatives in Urbana and Champaign, Illinois. It is a member of North American Students of Cooperation (NASCO).

COUCH began in 1997 as an umbrella organization for the independent housing co-ops in the Champaign–Urbana area, but was also founded with the vision of creating a larger co-op community to advance co-oping, establish community, and achieve economies of scale within the co-op community. It currently consists of three houses:

- Gwendolyn Brooks Cooperative (Urbana), a 14-member house, opened its doors as a member-controlled co-op house in August 2001.
- Harvest House Cooperative (Urbana), another 14-member house, was also founded in 2001.
- Randolph (Champaign), a 9-member house, was founded in 2019 and acquired by COUCH in 2022.

These housing co-ops provide affordable housing to residents of Urbana and Champaign. Each room is rented out separately, and each room is priced according to its size. On top of rent, each tenant pays a separate bill for utilities and food. Although rules change from house to house, it is customary that every night, one or two people cook for the house and in return, they are cooked for the other 6 nights of the week. Some houses are vegan or vegetarian, while other houses serve meat. Many commodities are included for free including free access to a washer and dryer and free printing. Many houses allow pets.
