= Santa Barbara Student Housing Cooperative =

Student house cooperative in Santa Barbara, California, U.S.

Coordinates: 34.4157°N 119.8586°W

The Santa Barbara Student Housing Cooperative (SBSHC) is a student housing cooperative designed to provide affordable housing for students attending post-secondary institutions in Santa Barbara County. The first coop was established in 1976, and today consists of five houses; Newman, Manley, Dolores, Biko and Merton. In all, just under 100 students live in these houses.

The purpose of the Santa Barbara Student Housing Co-op (SBSHC) is to provide low rent co-op housing regardless of gender, race, social, political, or religious affiliation. SBSHC engages in continuous educational programs that further the principles of cooperation through mutual, self-help living at a minimal cost.

The co-ops are located in Isla Vista and are centers of artistic expression, alternative thought, social activism and creativity. In 2006, the massively successful and now institutionalized "Chillavista" festival was organized out of the Biko co-op, and featured musical talent from the Isla Vista community including many bands spawned from and frequently performing at Isla Vista Co-ops. Chillavista was powered through renewable energy, featured local organic produce, screened several films on progressivism and sustainability and proved to be a highly successful zero waste event featuring national touring acts such as Delta Nove, Blue Turtle Seduction, Elijah Manuel & The Revelations and local psychedelic jam masters Silent Wei.

In 2006, the Isla Vista co-ops provided pivotal support to the over 200 residents evicted from their homes in Isla Vista by Conquest Housing. Many in the Isla Vista community regarded these evictions as racially motivated, since nearly all of the 200 men, women, and children who were evicted were Hispanic and had little access to legal representation on their behalf. In response, some residents of the co-ops rallied support for the families by throwing benefit concerts, establishing a protest "tent city" in the center of the UCSB campus and staging marches throughout Santa Barbara to raise awareness of these families' concerns. The efforts have contributed to the larger emerging front in Isla Vista united against the ongoing pattern of discriminatory eviction followed by student rent gouging.

SBSHC also has a long-standing partnership with the Isla Vista Food Cooperative.

== The Houses ==
=== Manley ===
During the summer of 2005, Manley received a remodeled kitchen, new roof, new windows, a converted storage to study room, a complete solar panel system, landscaped garden area and refinished upstairs deck. Residents now participate in a full meal plan with both meat and vegetarian/vegan options. The house charge covers electricity, gas, water, trash, laundry, and cable internet.

The Manley house has eleven bedrooms in two separate units. Three bedrooms are located upstairs, where there is a large deck and living room. Downstairs are eight bedrooms, a living room, kitchen, dining room, and study space.

The house is named after Steven Manley, who died August 15, 1979, battling a brush wildfire near Santa Maria. He was 21 years old and a Junior Environmental Studies Major at UCSB, working the summer as a firefighter with the California Division of Forestry.

=== Newman ===
Although Newman has nine separate apartments (six two-bedroom/one-bath units and three studios), Newman is a housing community. There is no meal plan for the Newman building but some members participate in optional potlucks. The homemade fire pit in front, worm bin composting system, gardens, and mural painting projects on the Newman's doors and walls, allows members to be creative and communal. The House charge for Newman's residents covers laundry, parking, water, trash and cable internet.

Newman House is named after Patti Newman, the first Executive Director and staff member of SBSHC.

=== Dolores ===
Dolores, formerly called Dashain, is a vegetarian/vegan house. Dolores strives to buy local food and cultivate a partnership with their neighboring organic and whole foods cooperative, the Isla Vista Food Co-op. Of the co-ops, Dolores is the closest to the beach situated on the 67 block of Sabado Tarde Road. Sunsets can be viewed from the window of the top three rooms, and fire loving occurs in the backyard. Dolores maintains its own garden space out back which once hosted a family of chickens.

The house has nine bedrooms and three bathrooms. Dolores has traditionally never had television in common space but have hosted community screenings in the living room or front and backyard. The house charge covers water, trash, electricity, gas, cable internet, parking and laundry.

Dolores is named after Dolores Huerta, a civil rights activist and co-founder of the National Farmworkers Association (now the United Farm Workers (UFW)) .

=== Biko ===
Named after Stephen Bantu Biko, founder and martyr of the Black Consciousness Movement in South Africa, Biko has been SBSHC's "People of Color" Co-op. Biko's theme provides a safe, respectful space for people of color in a predominantly white college campus community. A social justice house, Biko has been known to host ethnic studies events and socials for the Queer Student Union (QSU). Biko has twelve bedrooms and six bathrooms. Its kitchen is large and spacious, with industrial-strength cooking facilities and a stocked pantry. Biko has a mandatory meal plan that always offers both meat and vegetarian/vegan options. The House charge includes gas, electricity, water, trash, and laundry, and cable internet.

The garage space out front functions as central storage as well as an all-purpose community space for radical meetings, music, art exhibitions and dance. Biko Garage is funded by donation only, and is run and operated by house members. The basketball court and front garden and porch space, as well as ample parking, are some of the other benefits of living at the Biko.

=== Merton ===
The Thomas Merton Interfaith House was completed in April 2013, with the first residents moving in June 2013. The co-op house, located on the second floor of the building, has a large kitchen and living room, with semi dorm-style bathrooms. There is a sizable garden on the north side of the building, as well as bike storage lockers, SBSHC's office, and an auditorium and kitchen used for five SBSHC events per year.

The theme of the house is Interfaith, continuing the legacy of the University Religious Center who previously owned the building. Through continuing funds, co-op members are enabled to attend interfaith conferences, host interfaith-themed events, and make connections with faith groups around the community and the world.

SBSHC members who live at Merton House, are students at University of California, Santa Barbara, and who qualify as low income by the standards set by the County of Santa Barbara receive a scholarship that is a significant reduction in their rent, making Merton House the most affordable UCSB student housing in Isla Vista.

Merton House is named after Thomas Merton, an Anglo-American Catholic writer and Mystic who was an advocate of spirituality, social justice, pacifism, and interfaith understanding post-World War II.
