= University of Texas Inter-Cooperative Council =

Coordinates: 30.286972°N 97.743457°W

Inter-Cooperative Council
- Company type: Housing cooperative
- Founded: 1934
- Headquarters: Austin, Texas, United States
- Members: Students & Community Members
- Website: Inter-Cooperative Council Austin

The University of Texas Inter-Cooperative Council (ICC) is a student owned and operated housing cooperative serving students and community members in Austin, Texas. ICC Austin is an active member of NASCO.

Each house community is run primarily by its student members and elected stewards with oversight from full-time staff members. The nine communities differ in terms of types of dinners served (omnivorous, vegan, or vegetarian), rules regarding pets and alcohol consumption, and various other traditions.

== Houses ==
ICC Austin operates nine houses within the West Campus neighborhood of Austin, Texas. ICC primarily serves students attending local colleges and universities, such as University of Texas at Austin, Austin Community College, and St. Edward's University.

ICC Austin Houses
Coop Name	Address	Notes
Arrakis	2212 Pearl St.	
Avalon	3000 University Ave.	House now closed
Eden House	1910 Rio Grande St.	
French House	710 W. 21st St.	
Helios	1909 Nueces St.	
House of Commons	2610 Rio Grande St.	
New Guild	510 W. 23rd St.	
Royal	1805 Pearl St.	
Ruth Schulze	915 W 22nd St.	Substance free housing
House of Audre Lorde	2309 Nueces St.	Formerly known as Seneca Falls

== See also ==
- Inter-Cooperative Council at the University of Michigan
- NASCO
