= Inter-Cooperative Council at the University of Michigan =

Student housing cooperative

Coordinates: 42.282255°N 83.74525°W

Inter-Cooperative Council
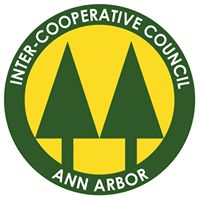
- Type: Housing cooperative
- Founded: 1934
- Headquarters: Ann Arbor, Michigan, United States
- Members: Mature Students & Community Members
- Website: Inter-Cooperative Council

The Inter-Cooperative Council at the University of Michigan (ICC) is a student owned and operated housing cooperative serving students and community members in Ann Arbor, Michigan. The ICC is an active member of NASCO.

== History ==
In response to the harsh economic times imposed by the Great Depression, members of the Socialist Club at the University of Michigan founded the Michigan Socialist House, located at 335 East Ann Street, in 1932. In return for four to five hours of work and two dollars each week, each of the 18 founding members received room, board, barber, canning, and laundry service. The success of the Michigan Socialist House fueled other cooperative endeavors by the Socialist Club, the most notable being the Michigan Cooperative Boarding House, later to be renamed the Michigan Wolverine Eating Co-op. The Michigan Wolverine Eating Co-op would later play a vital role in the expansion of the cooperative movement on campus. By serving as a common ground for members of the Socialist Club and the Student Christian Association, which owned the building at the time, the Wolverine Eating Co-op introduced the idea of housing cooperatives to many within the religious community.

The second wave of student cooperative houses was formally initiated in 1934 through the efforts of the Reverend and Mrs. H. L. Pickerill. The Pickerills welcomed students to live in their house in exchange for performing household chores. By 1936 there were a total of eight students living in the Pickerills' attic who, with the help of a $700 loan from the Reverend, rented a house on Thompson Street naming it the Student Cooperative House and, later, Rochdale House. Because the women who often visited the Rochdale Co-op were in a similar economic position to their male counterparts and the university did not allow for males and females to cohabitate, they began to look for a house of their own. A house at 517 East Ann Street was rented and ran smoothly as the Girls' Cooperative House until 1939 when it was forced to move to 1511 Washtenaw Street, adopting the new name, the Alice Freeman Palmer House, named after prominent women's educational rights activist Alice Freeman Palmer.

In 1937, adhering to the Rochdale Principles of cooperation among cooperatives and continuing education, the four existing student cooperatives, the Michigan Socialist House, the Michigan Wolverine Eating Co-op, the Rochdale cooperative House and the yet to be renamed Girls' Cooperative House joined to form the Campus Cooperative Council. This organization later became known as the Inter-Cooperative Council and, in 1939, submitted a draft of its first constitution to be adopted and ratified by each of the cooperatives on campus. The increased economy, efficiency, and publicity gained through the establishment of the Inter-Cooperative Council facilitated the establishment of many more student cooperatives on Campus. This expansion reached its peak prior to the outbreak of World War II when the ICC consisted of 12 independent rooming and boarding houses. All of the organization's houses were rented until 1943 when Stevens House was purchased, named after Albert K. Stevens, an early supporter of the ICC.

The ICC hired its first paid executive director, Luther H. Buchele, in 1951, although some students felt having paid leadership was at odds with cooperative values. Under his leadership, the Inter-Cooperative Council began a steady period of expansion from 1953 to 1978, during which several more houses were purchased and the North Campus Co-ops were constructed.

== Governance ==
In accordance with the second Rochdale principle, democratic member control, ultimate authority in the organization lies with the board of directors. The ICC Board meets on Mondays, typically twice a month.

=== Board of directors ===
The Board of Directors includes voting representatives from each house (one per house with the exceptions: 3 from Escher, 2 from MichMinnies), the chairpersons of standing committees (non-voting), and the General Manager (non-voting).

=== Committees ===
Each board member must serve on one of the following committees chaired by Vice Presidents (VPs). The committees are:

- Diversity, Equity, and Inclusion Committee (DEICom)
- Education Committee (EdCom)
- Operations Management Committee (OpsCom)
- Marketing and Recruitment Committee (MarCo)
- Finance Committee (FinCom)
- Facilities Management Committee (FamCom)

The VPs of each committee, the ICC president, and the General Manager sit on another committee that helps to coordinate the efforts of all the other committees and the board of directors. This committee is known as the Coordinating Committee (CoCo).

== Houses ==
The ICC currently owns 19 houses and 1 office around the Central and North Campuses of the University of Michigan. The houses are primarily named after past co-opers and are often known locally by the honoree's last name (e.g. Karl D. Gregory House goes by simply 'Gregory').

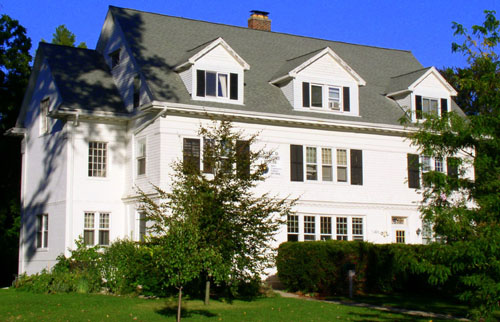
Gregory House, an ICC affiliated cooperative house

=== Central Campus ===
==== Ella Baker Cooperative House ====
Ella Baker Graduate Co-operative, known previously under several names including the James R. Jones House, Joint House, and Tri-House (in conjunction with A.K. Stevens) was originally opened as two separate houses; Mark VIII, purchased in 1961, and Pickerell, purchased in 1965. The two houses were connected via the addition of a large central room and functioned as a single co-op. After being remodeled in 2007, the co-op adopted its current name and offered housing tailored for graduate students instead of operating primarily for undergraduates. It is located at 917-923 S. Forest Ave.

==== Black Elk Cooperative House ====
Black Elk Cooperative House was founded in 1986, and is located at 902 Baldwin Avenue. Black Elk is a vegetarian house and does not allow meat on the property in any form.

==== Eugene V. Debs Cooperative House ====
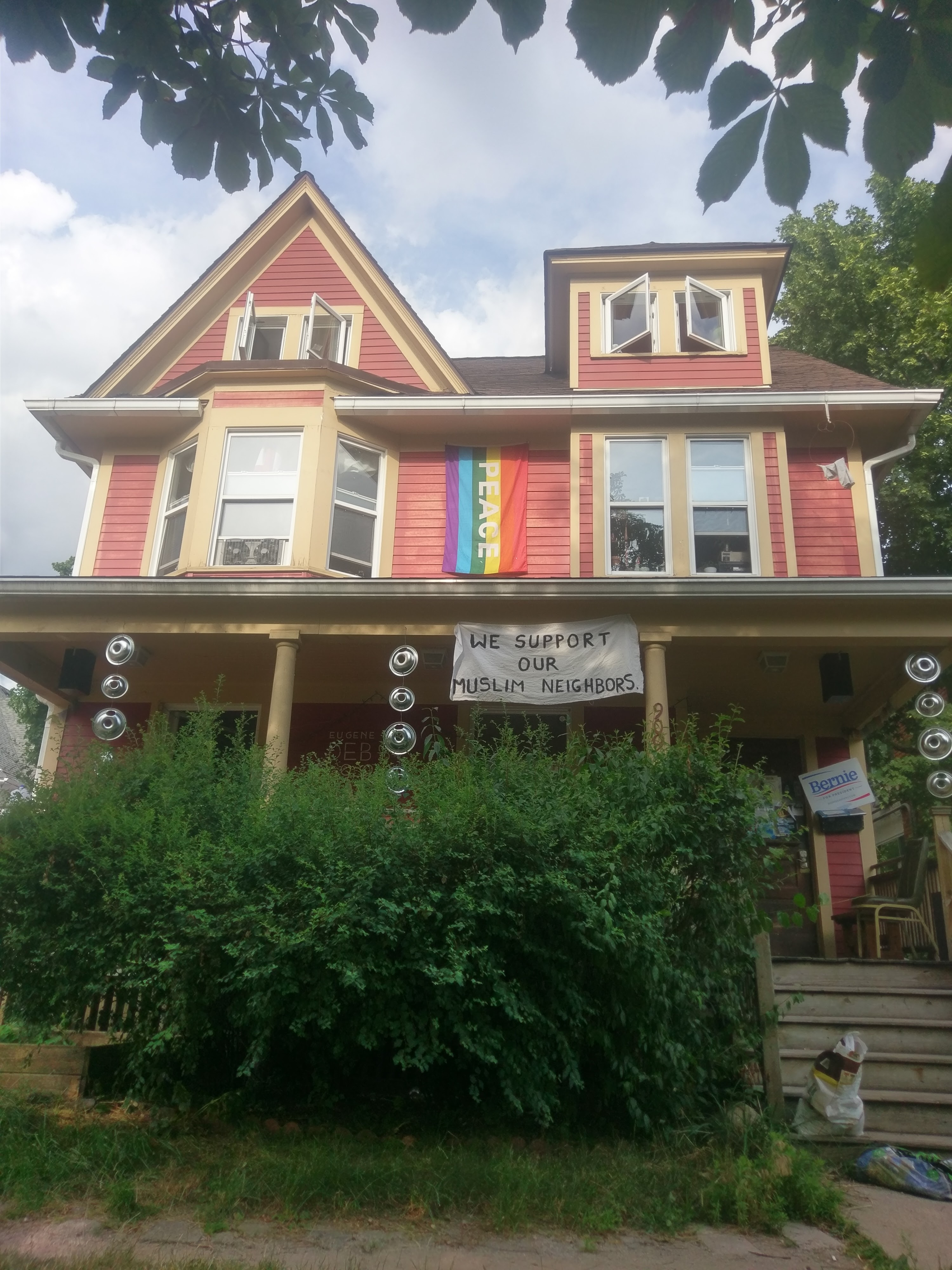
Debs Cooperative House

Eugene V. Debs Cooperative House was founded in 1967, and is located at 909 E. University Avenue. Debs Cooperative houses 23 residents, and members cook vegetarian and vegan meals.

==== Karl D. Gregory Cooperative House ====
Karl D. Gregory Cooperative House at 1617 Washtenaw was originally built in 1909 for the Tau Gamma Nu fraternity and was purchased by the ICC in 1995. Gregory House is the only house in the organization that is expressly substance free. No tobacco, alcohol, or illicit drugs are allowed on the property. As of June 2008, Gregory House has a maximum capacity of 29 members (by way of 13 single and 8 double capacity rooms). Karl D. Gregory is an alumnus of Nakamura House. Gregory has been a long time activist of civil and human rights. After being successful under appointments by Presidents Kennedy, Johnson, Ford, Carter, and Reagan, he generously donated $20,000 to the ICC. This was used to acquire the Karl D. Gregory Cooperative House, named in his honor.

==== Coretta Scott King Cooperative House ====
Coretta Scott King Cooperative House is located at 803 East Kingsley Street. Compared to other ICC co-ops, King functions closer to an apartment complex with six separate units, having less common shared space.

==== Marsha P. Johnson & Sylvia Rivera Cooperative House ====
Muriel Lester Cooperative House was founded in 1940 as an all-women's cooperative house; in 2021, the previous members of Lester Cooperative House and the Inter-Cooperative Council Board of Directors worked to re-theme the cooperative to "Sylvia Rivera Cooperative House". It was renamed again to the Marsha P. Johnson and Sylvia Rivera Cooperative House. The theme of Johnson-Rivera is to be a safe space that centers the needs and experiences of Queer Trans People of Color (QTPOC). Today it is located at 900 Oakland Street and is, like all ICC co-ops, inclusive of all genders. It houses 15 residents. Although the theme of Rivera Co-op is to be a safe space for QTPOC, due to fair housing laws, anyone is allowed to live at Rivera Co-op; it is not solely limited to QTPOC.

The November 27, 1943 Thanksgiving issue of the Saturday Evening Post featured Lester Cooperative House in an article about student cooperative movements in America.

==== Benjamin Linder Cooperative House ====
Benjamin Linder Cooperative House was purchased by the ICC and officially incorporated in 1988. Located at 711 Catherine St. it was originally built in 1894 and housed other organizations such as the Phi Chi fraternity and the Keystone Club. The house is named after Benjamin Linder who was an engineer, a clown, and an activist who was killed in 1987 by the Contras while working on hydroelectric dams in Nicaragua. Linder is known for their dinners, cozy atmosphere, sunflowers, and most importantly their chickens.

==== Luther Buchele Cooperative House ====
Luther Buchele Cooperative House, known as 'Luther House' or 'Luther Cooperative', is made up of two houses located at 1510 and 1520 Hill Street. The buildings were purchased by the Inter-Cooperative Council in 1986; prior to that the buildings were home to John Sinclair, the MC5 and the White Panther Party. Located behind the two residential houses is the ICC's Moses Coady-Paulo Friere Cooperative Education Center, at which various educational and board meetings are held. Luther Cooperative is one of the larger cooperatives in the ICC, capable of housing up to 50 members split between the two homes. Luther House is known for its annual Halloween party, 'Lutherween'.

The house is named after Luther Buchele, the ICC's first full time staff member, who served in various positions, including general manager, throughout the organization for 34 years.

==== Michigan Cooperative House ====
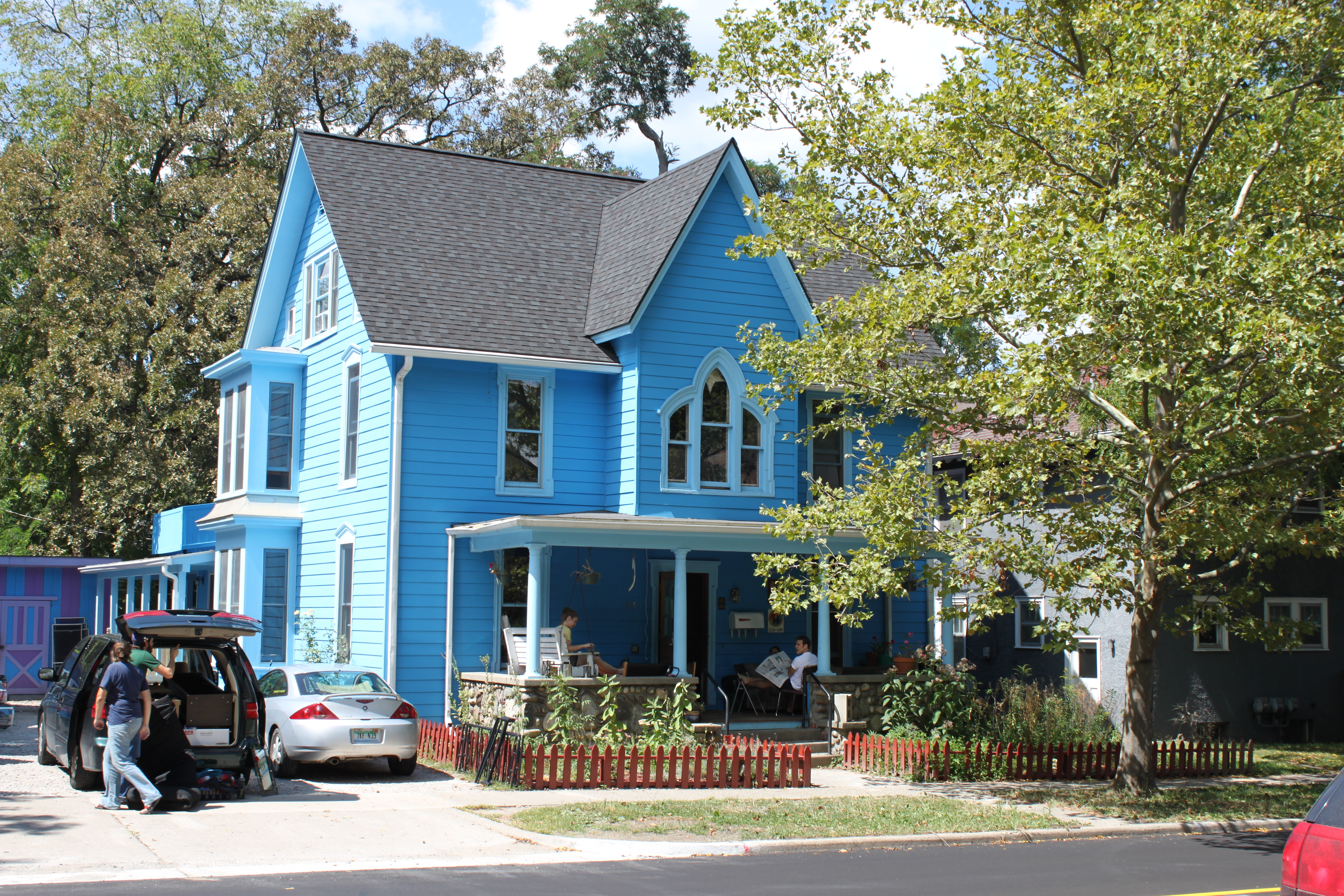
Michigan Cooperative House

Michigan Cooperative House is the oldest cooperative house in the ICC, founded in 1932 as the Michigan Socialist House. It is located at 315 N. State Street.

==== Minnie's Cooperative House ====
Minnie's Cooperative House was founded in 1970, and is located at 307 N. State Street. It neighbors Michigan Cooperative House, and as such the two share meals and many aspects of their culture.

==== John Nakamura Cooperative House ====
John Nakamura Cooperative is named after John Nakamura, a previous ICC member who served in World War 2. The Cooperative was named after Nakamura due to his service to a country that was actively discriminating against him. Nakamura Cooperative is known for their biweekly open mic nights.

==== Harold Osterweil Cooperative House ====
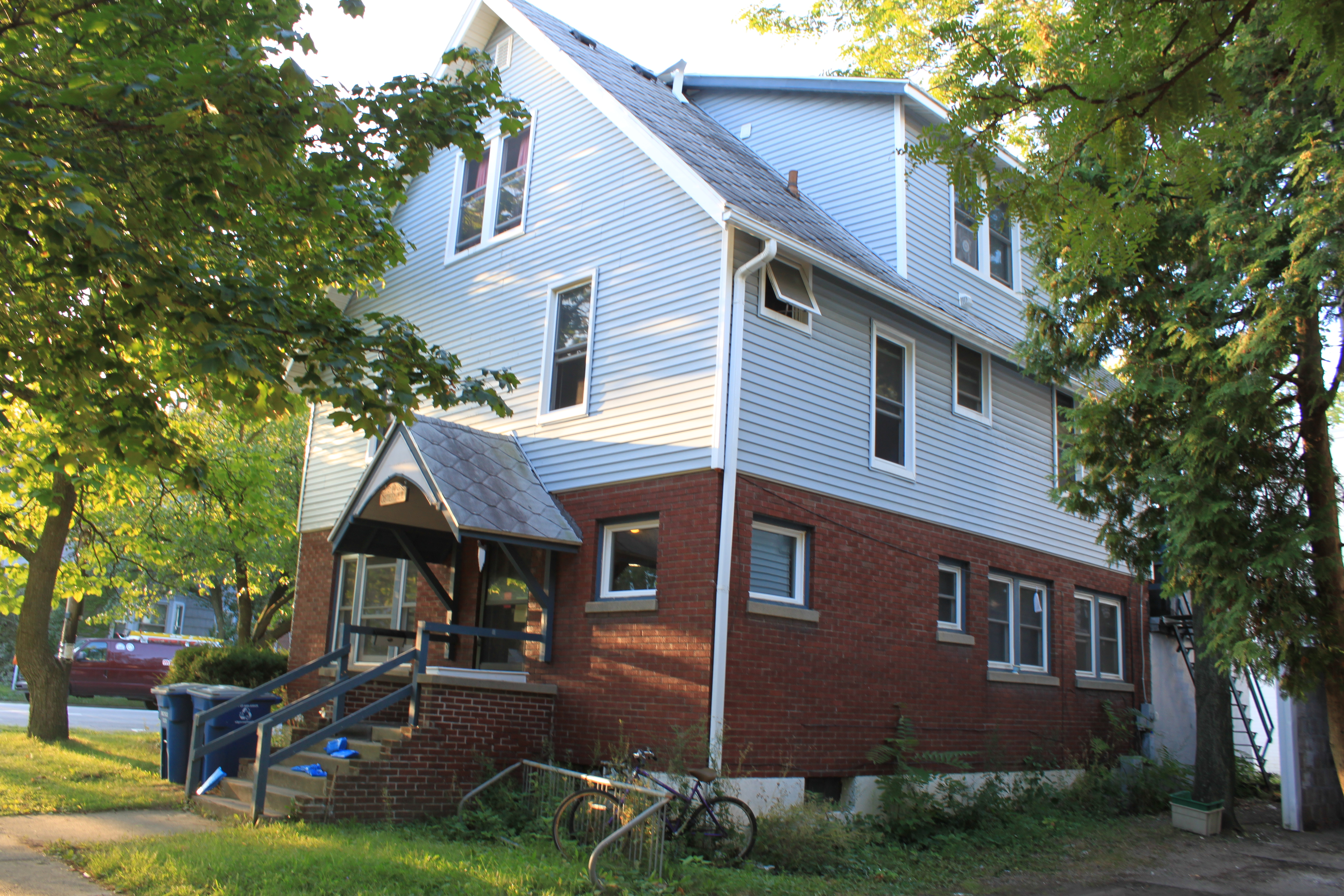
Osterweil House

Harold Osterweil Cooperative House is a student housing cooperative located on East Jefferson Street in Ann Arbor, Michigan. Osterweil is the third oldest co-operative and is one of the smallest in the Inter-Cooperative Council. The cooperative is named after Economics professor Harold Osterweil. Its first residents were men during the summer of 1946, but in the fall of 1946 Osterweil became a women's house and in 1970 became co-ed. By the time of its purchase, all new student housing had to be approved by the university because students were legally considered minors at that time. Because the ICC moved so fast in its expansion, the university was not asked for approval until after the house was already purchased. The first house that the university granted approval for retroactively is most likely Osterweil.

==== Robert Owen Cooperative House ====
Robert Owen Cooperative House, which deems their theme as "theme-less" was founded in 1938 and moved to the current location of 1017 Oakland Ave in 1944.

==== Ruths' Cooperative House ====
Ruths' was purchased by the ICC in 1993 and is located at 321 N. Thayer. Ruths' has a theme of "cozy/granny" and has a maximum occupancy of 12 residents.

==== Sojourner Truth Cooperative House ====
Sojourner Truth Cooperative House holds 52 members and is themed as a house welcoming international students. The house was originally named after comedian Lenny Bruce before adopting its current name in the 1980s.

==== Stefan T. Vail Cooperative House ====
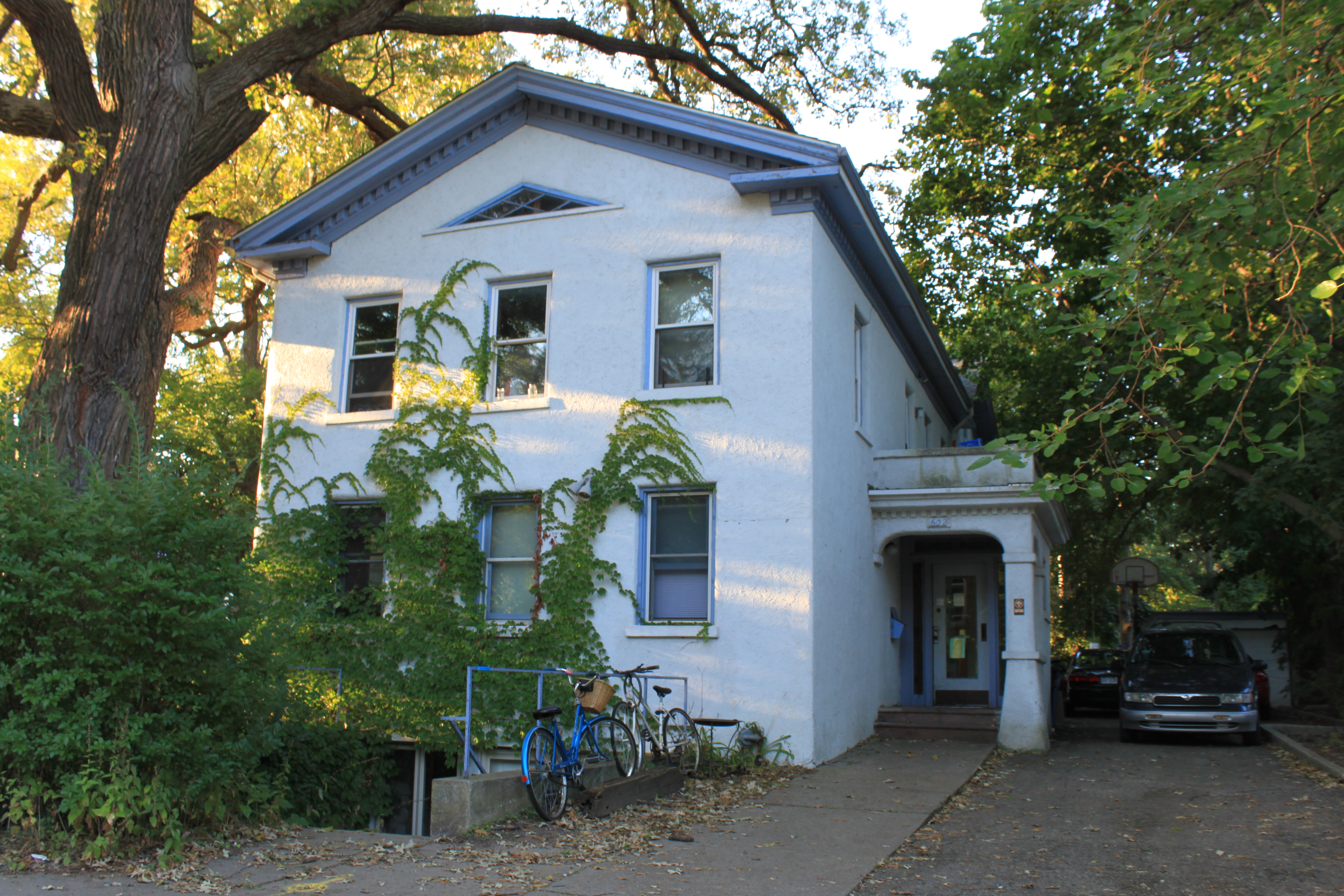
Stefan T. Vail House

Stefan T. Vail Cooperative House is located at 602 Lawrence Street, and was founded in 1960. The house proper was constructed in 1848, and is a recognized as a historic building by the city of Ann Arbor. Vail Cooperative houses 23 residents and cooks vegetarian and vegan meals while maintaining a theme of sustainability.

=== North Campus ===
==== Escher Cooperative House ====
Which was previously two houses:

- Georgia O'Keeffe
- Renaissance

=== Office ===
==== Rochdale Center ====
The ICC's main office, the Rochdale Center, is located at 377 E. William Street.

=== Past Houses ===
Several ICC houses have closed, sold, or been lost to fire since the creation of the Inter-Cooperative Council, including:

- A.K. Stevens House (Purchased in 1943, burnt down in 2004)
- Brandeis House (Purchased 1956)
- Congress House (Founded 1939, dissolved during World War II)
- Palmer House (Founded 1939, dissolved during World War II)
- Rochdale House (Founded 1937, dissolved during World War II)
- Xanadu House (Purchased in 1971, sold in 1986)
- Zeno House (2006–2008)

== See also ==
- North American Students of Cooperation
- University of Texas Inter-Cooperative Council
