= North American Students of Cooperation =

Housing cooperative federation in North America

- Company type: Cooperative federation
- Founded: 1968
- Headquarters: Chicago, United States
- Revenue: 434,782 United States dollar (2022)
- Total assets: 369,040 United States dollar (2022)
- Members: Housing cooperatives
- Website: nasco.coop

The North American Students of Cooperation (NASCO) is a federation of housing cooperatives in Canada and the United States, started in 1968. Traditionally, NASCO has been associated with student housing cooperatives, though non-student cooperatives are included in its network. NASCO provides its member cooperatives with operational assistance, encourages the development of new cooperatives, and serves as an advocate for cooperatives to government, universities, and communities. NASCO teaches leadership skills, provides information, and serves as a central link in facilitating the fruition of the cooperative vision for students and youth.

== Programs and services ==
=== Linking and networking activities ===
NASCO acts as the organized voice of the "group-equity" cooperative housing movement, both in terms of bringing together student and community co-op activists, and in maintaining relationships with national cooperative organizations, including the National Cooperative Business Association and the Cooperative Housing Federation of Canada.

=== Training and consulting ===
NASCO works with its members and the general public on a variety of more extensive training and consulting activities. The NASCO staff visits Active Member groups at least once every two years, providing free consultation and training on a variety of topics as a member service.

NASCO holds numerous workshops with topics including meeting process, board roles and responsibilities, planning, staff relations, marketing, diversity awareness, conflict resolution, facilitation, consensus decision-making, and organizational development for new cooperatives. Recent consulting efforts have included general manager evaluation assistance, business plan development, and expansion assistance. Other on-site consulting has included work on governance systems, accounting systems, maintenance planning, member recruitment, and participation strategies.

=== Co-op Voices ===
NASCO's Co-op Voices newsletter features reports on activity among cooperatives in Canada and the United States. It reports on NASCO's activities and provides updates on co-operative news. The newsletter articles are written by and for co-op members.

=== Regional activity ===
NASCO supports and assists, to varying degrees, regional networking and training opportunities for co-op members and staff. In the Midwest, on the West Coast, in Ontario, in Minneapolis-St. Paul, and in the Northeast, co-ops meet annually for workshops and social events, where they can discuss issues pertinent to their co-ops.

=== The NASCO Cooperative Education and Training Institute ===
NASCO holds an annual conference, NASCO Institute, which is usually held in Ann Arbor, Michigan and hosted by the Inter-Cooperative Council at the University of Michigan. This is a multiday conference, most of which is spent in workshops, skillshares, and caucuses. The courses cover topics of interest to participants in the cooperative movement and progressivism in general. There is typically a guest speaker and an annual theme.

=== Action Camp ===
The Action Camp, held each August, provides an intensive training environment for leaders and active members of housing co-ops, worker collectives, and other democratically run communities. Participants spend one week in a beautiful, natural environment engaging in a week-long program on privilege and anti-oppression work and interactive fun, using techniques from Augusto Boal's "Theater of the Oppressed."

=== Development services ===
Special organizing and training resources are made available to groups interested in starting or expanding cooperatives. NASCO Development Services provides an array of development services including assistance in pre-development activities, financial assistance, and start-up assistance.

=== Kagawa Fund ===
In 1989, a $50,000 donation from the Japanese Consumer Cooperative Union was used to seed The Kagawa Fund for Student Cooperative Development. The Kagawa Fund, named for Toyohiko Kagawa, provides loans and technical assistance to new and existing housing cooperatives. The fund is administered by the Cooperative Development Foundation and NASCO Development Services.

=== Property ownership and asset management services ===
In 1988, NASCO Properties was established as an affiliate of NASCO to purchase and hold title to housing around the United States, which is then leased to local co-ops.

Its first property was the House of Commons, a 21 bedroom student house in Austin, Texas. It acquired the title from an ailing student housing co-op, ICC-Austin, with the purpose of keeping the building in the affordable cooperative housing sector. ICC-Austin bought the house back from NASCO Properties in 2003.

NASCO manages NASCO Properties and through it provides assistance to the local leasing co-ops. Staff members visit each leasing co-op at least three times per year to help with finances, maintenance, and other problems or issues that may arise. In 2004, a second title holding organization was created between NASCO and Riverton Community Housing called Lots in Common (LINC). NASCO entered into asset management contracts for Davis Campus Cooperatives in 2006.

NASCO-Partnered Housing Cooperatives include:

- CHEA, Austin, Texas
- Community of Urbana Champaign Cooperative Housing (COUCH), Champaign-Urbana, IL
- Kalamazoo Collective Housing, Kalamazoo, Michigan
- Nickel City Housing Cooperative (NCHC), Buffalo, New York
- Qumbya, Chicago, IL
- Santa Cruz Student Housing Co-ops (SC-SHC), Santa Cruz, California
- Student Cooperative Organization (SCO), Athens, Ohio

== See also ==
- List of NASCO member cooperatives
- Davis Campus Cooperatives, conjoined with NASCO Properties
- List of condominiums and housing cooperatives in New York
- Students for Cooperation (UK)
