= George Gray =

George Gray may refer to:

== Politics ==
- George Gray (Pennsylvania politician) (1725–1800), speaker of the Pennsylvania Provincial Assembly
- George Gray (Delaware politician) (1840–1925), U.S. senator from Delaware
- George Wilkie Gray (1844–1924), businessman and member of the Queensland Legislative Council
- George Gray (Tasmanian politician) (1899–1984), member of both houses of the Tasmanian Parliament
- George Gray (Australian politician, born 1903) (1903–1967), member of the Australian House of Representatives

== Science ==
- George Robert Gray (1808–1872), British zoologist
- George Gray (chemist) (1926–2013), British chemist, developer of cyano-biphenyl liquid crystals used in liquid crystal displays

== Sports ==
- George Gray (shot putter) (1865–1933), Canadian shot putter
- George Gray (hurdler) (1887–1970), British Olympic hurdler
- George Gray (billiards player) (1892–?), Australian billiards player
- George Gray (footballer, born 1894) (1894–1972), English football wing half active in the 1920s, later trainer of Sunderland
- George Gray (footballer, born 1896) (1896–1962), English footballer
- George Gray (footballer, born 1925) (1925–1995), English football wing half active in the 1950s, son of the 1894-born footballer
- One Man Gang (George Gray, born 1960), American professional wrestler

== Others ==
- Sir George Gray, 3rd Baronet (c. 1710–1773), British Army officer
- George Gray, founder of the Hawkhurst Gang, a notorious smuggling organisation in southeast England from 1735 until 1749
- George Gray (painter) (1758–1819), English painter
- George Seaman Gray (1835–1885), American minister and author
- George Zabriskie Gray (1837–1889), American clergyman, educator and theologian of the Episcopal Church
- George Douglas Gray (1872–1946), Scottish physician and British Army officer
- George Kruger Gray (1880–1943), English artist and coin designer
- George Charles Gray (1897–1981), English cathedral organist
- George Gray (television personality) (born 1967), American television presenter

== See also ==
- George Grey (disambiguation)
