= St Mary's Tower, Hornsey =

Church tower in London, England

St Mary's Tower
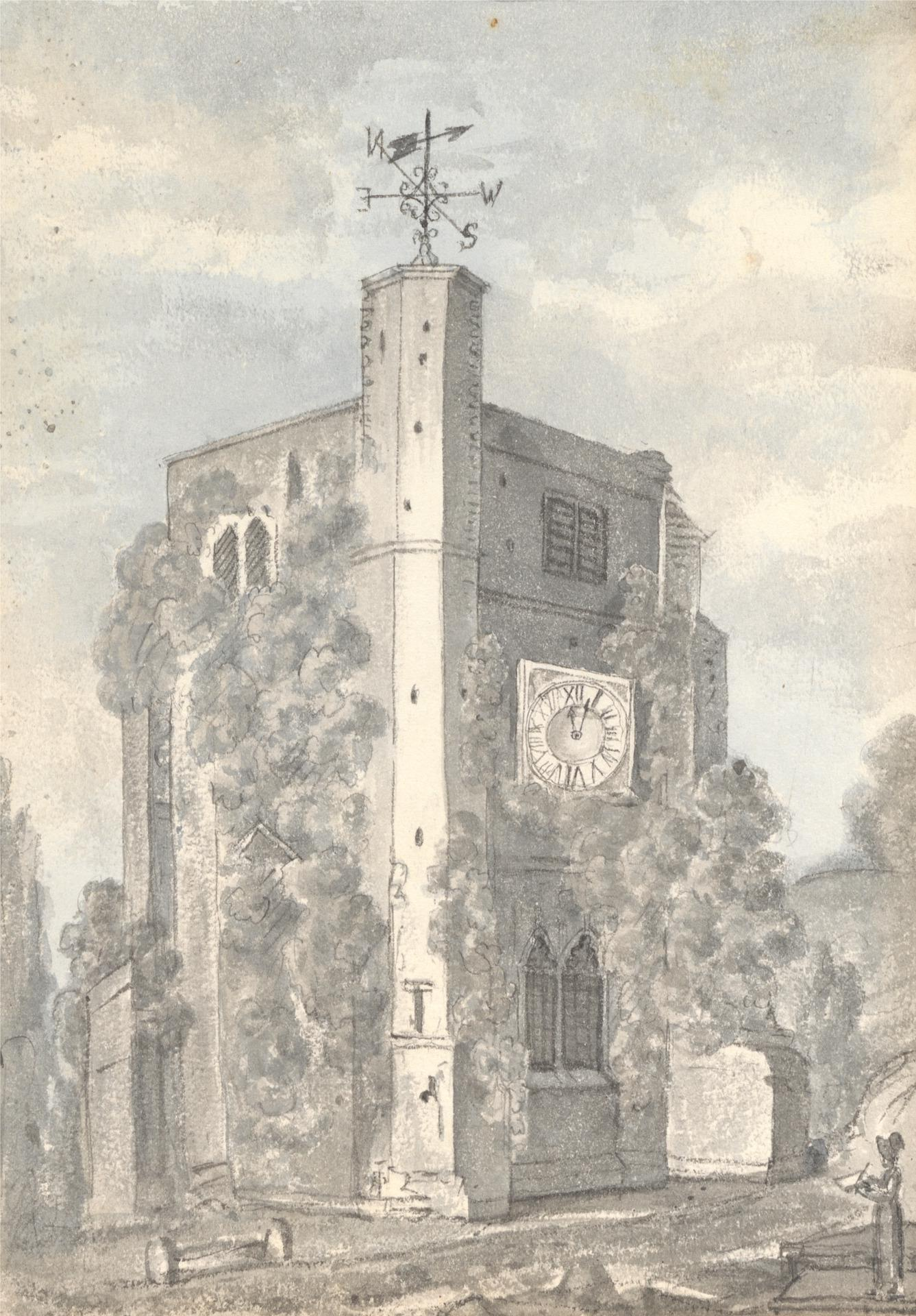
- Illustration from 1850 by Anne Rushout
- Interactive map of St Mary's Tower
- 51°35′15″N 0°06′56″W
- Location: London Borough of Haringey

Listed Building – Grade II

St Mary's Tower, Hornsey is the only piece of architecture remaining from St Mary's medieval parish church in Hornsey, now part of the environs of north London. The tower is the oldest building in Hornsey, though the exact date of building is not known. It remains a consecrated space.

== Background ==
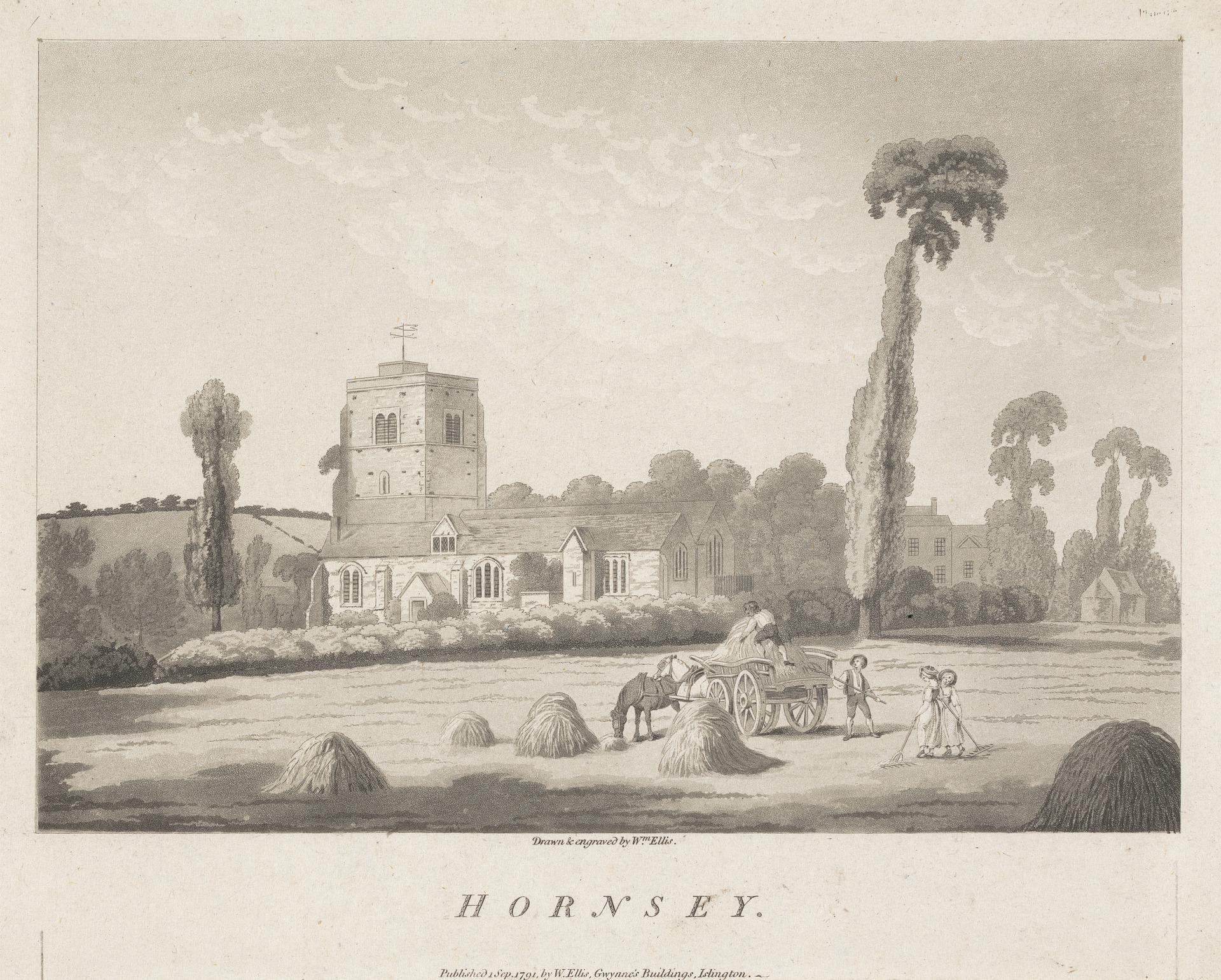
William Ellis aquatint 1791

The first official record of the church and of Hornsey village, is in the papal taxation list of 1291, however the original construction date of the church is not known. The church itself was expanded and extended at various dates since. The tower is situated off what is now Hornsey High Street, N8, located in what would have been the centre of the medieval village and large parish of Hornsey, at the time around four miles from London, on the way to the Lea Valley. By 1800 the area was still agricultural, with some large manor houses beginning to appear. Most of the medieval church was razed in 1832 and a new one designed to replace it in 1833. Stone from the old church was used to raise the tower, which held the bells. Another, larger, grander church was envisioned for the larger, suburban population. However available land was insufficient and a building was squeezed in on the opposite site of the churchyard, without tower or steeple, in 1889. Over a period of 40 years, the 1833 church, the medieval tower and the 1889 church stood beside each other. The 1833 church was demolished in 1927, little more than a ruin by that point. The Hornsey Journal commented at the time that the church was in a "shockingly bad condition" but that the tower evoked strong feeling locally, as it was the symbol of the village and that keen sentiment is what would safeguard it for the future The vestry of the tower was used for local meetings, boy scout groups etc. The later church was razed in 1969.

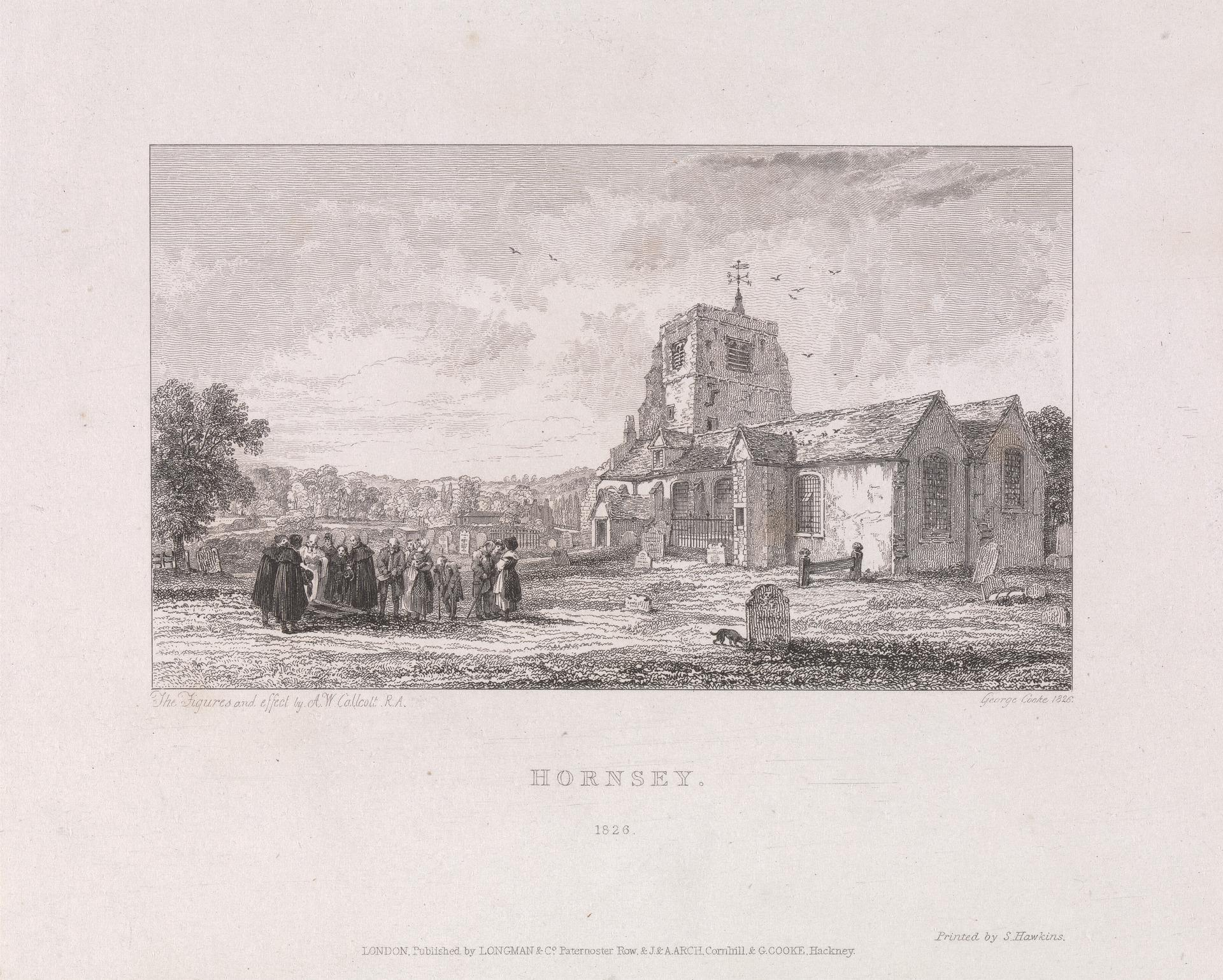
1826 engraving by George Cooke

Surrounded by fields until the late 19th century, the area around the church and tower was a burial ground stretching back to at least the 13th century. With the new urban development in late Victorian England, the grounds were closed to new gravesites. In the last half of the 19th century it seems that the tower was clad in ivy. This made the building seem even more myseterious and romantic and so a subject for art. A photograph from 1870 shows the tower smothered in ivy. In 1876 James Thorne writes, in Handbook of the Environs of London: "The church looks better at a distance than close at hand. The old ivy-covered tower is an attractive object from the neighbouring heights and picturesque when near".

During all the changes to the churches on the site, the bells of the tower continued to be regularly rung. In 1880, the 1770 bells were replaced by rector Jeakes. In the 1930s craftsmen from the Whitechapel Bell Foundry attended to the bells, adding new gudgeons and bearing, frame was reinforced, a flagstaff and electric wiring was added. In 1959 a report by the Whitechapel Bell Foundry noted that the stability of the tower was no longer suitable for ringing the bells, even ringing one caused the tower to rock alarmingly. This may have arisen after structural changes were made to the church. The bell frames were said to be "in a filthy state". The bells were moved to another church and the tower no longer had its central, useful function of centuries. The local ringers grieved the loss.

== The current tower ==
St Mary's was the parish church for Hornsey, which remained a small, rural village until the end of the 19th century, when the arrival of the railways turned the area into a suburban commuter belt for London. The tower is all that remains of the various churches on the site between the medieval period and today.

The mixed make up of the tower is listed by Historic England thus: "The lower part mostly ironstone rubble, roughly coursed, the upper part with much lighter coloured stone including Oxford stone and Kentish greensand and some brick [with] dressed stone quoins." The Historic England site give the full architectural breakdown of the current features of the tower, including the buttresses, aisles, pillars, arches and vaulting.

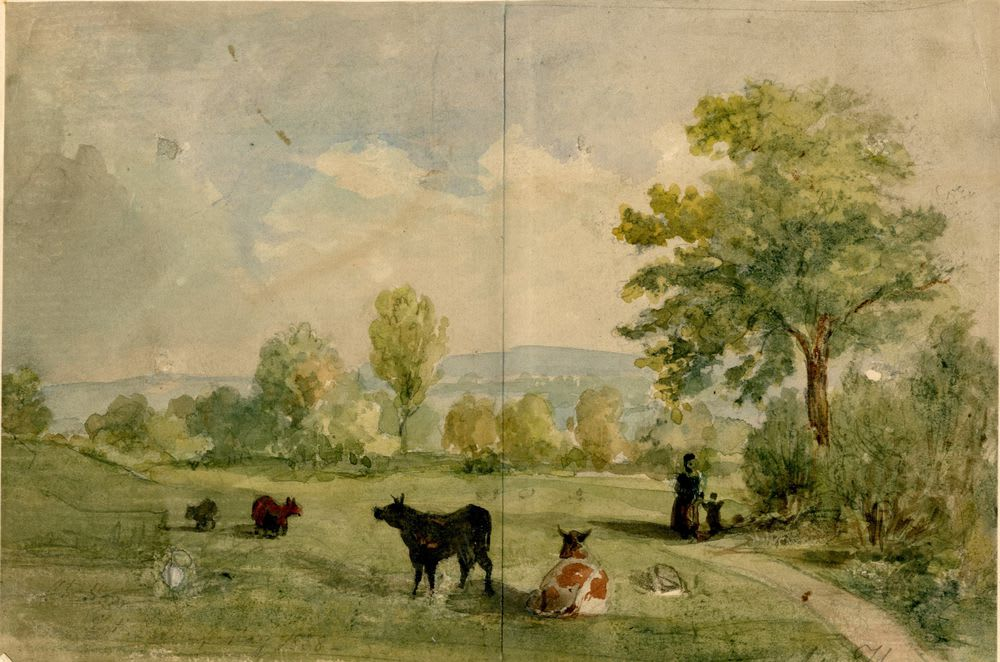
"At Hornsey" (1838) by E.H. Dixon, showing the rural, agricultural setting of mid-19th century Hornsey

The site was designated as a WWII garden of remembrance in 1950 and the tower was became a grade II listed building in 1951. A rebuilding of the church was discussed through the 1970s and 80s, becoming an increasingly expensive and unlikely project. The abandoned tower suffered from break ins and the walls and doors were walled up. In 1980 the road where the tower is sited was designated as a conservation area. In 1987 the tower committee decided to unwall the blocked up doors and make an assessment. They found the tower was on the verge of total collapse; the lead had been stolen from the roof, the timbers had rotted out and the roof had nearly given out. A new committee and a Friends group was created to support the restoration of the tower. The Friends registered as a charity in 1990. Through the 1990s, conservation began to be taken seriously nationally. Funds for emergency repairs were raised ad the public were invited to attend open days. In 1991 the roof had been made safe and visitors were allowed to ascend to the roof and enjoy the tower-top views across north London. The Friends of the tower continue to raise runs and manage the tower. In 1996 the vestry ceiling was repaired and in 2000 the west window was re-opened. Between 2005–6 extensive repairs were made to the tower, funded by Haringey Council and a Heritage Lottery grant. The ceiling of the ringing chamber was replaced. There are two angels carrying shields set on the wall to the west. They represent Thomas Savage (1496-1501) and William Warham (1501-3), Bishops of London between 1496 and 1503.

Cherry notes that "modern floodlighting and improvements to its setting have helped recover its identity as a valued local landmark in the High Street and a focus for community activities." Regular tours of the tower are held for the public and the space is now used as a performance venue, seating 25. The tower is open for the London Open House festival each year and features as film and television locations. A book charting the history of the tower was published by Bridget Cherry in 2015.

== Artists' historical record ==
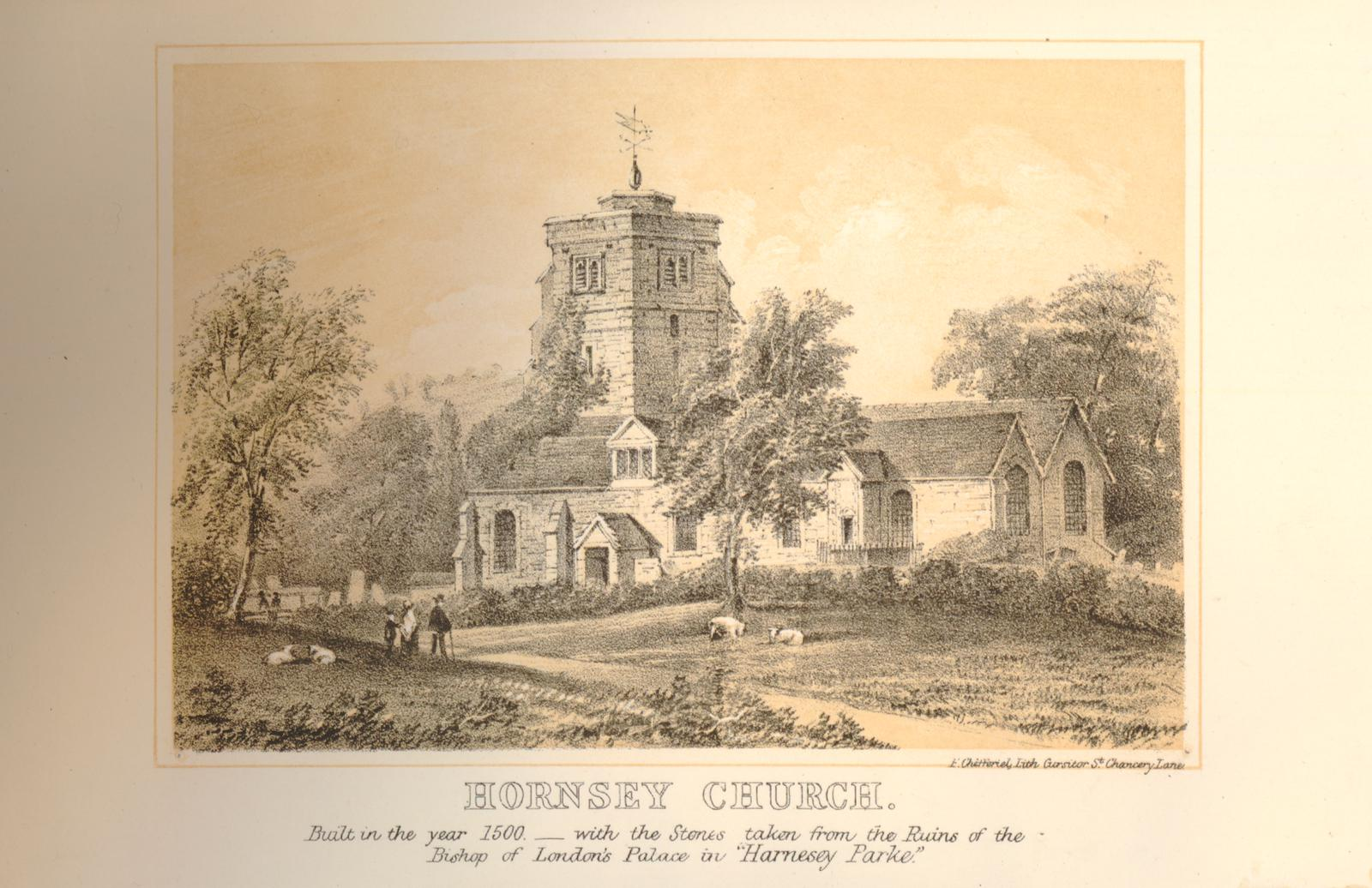
Hornsey church circa 1830-1850, by Frederick Chifferiel. Illustration in the British Museum

Cherry notes that much of the continent was not accessible to travellers during the times of the Napoleonic Wars and interest in exploring their own British Isles bloomed. During the 18th and 19th centuries, ancient stone churches became rarer, as they were gradually replaced with grander, modern buildings. Areas of Middlesex, like Hornsey, were lauded for their "quaint", pretty rural villages, an easy distance from London. History books and visitors' guides began to include Hornsey and the tower in their pages. From the late eighteenth century romantic illustrations of the church and tower abounded, sketches made from the surrounding fields. Prints of the church, watercolours and aquatints for framing in the home, became a cheap and popular way for interior decoration. They have given a remarkable record of the site over the centuries. Such illustrations appear in Fifty small views adjacent to London by J Roberts (1750), William Thornton's History of London (1784) and The environs of London by Daniel Lysons. It was Lysons that seems to have first published the estimation that the church was built around 1500, and the comment was often repeated after that point. Artists who drew the church include Francis Jukes, John Bewick (who lived near by), Robert Blemmell Schnebbelie, George Cooke, Michael Angelo Rooker, Anne Rushout, George Arnald and Frederick Wilton Litchfield Stockdale. A wide selection of these pictures in held by the Bruce Castle Museum prints and drawings collection, in Haringey.

== Bibliography ==
- Ivy-Mantled Tower: A History of the Church and Churchyard of St Mary’s (2015) Hornsey Historical Society by Bridget Cherry
