= Hornsey =

Area of London, England

Coordinates: 51.587°N 0.118°W

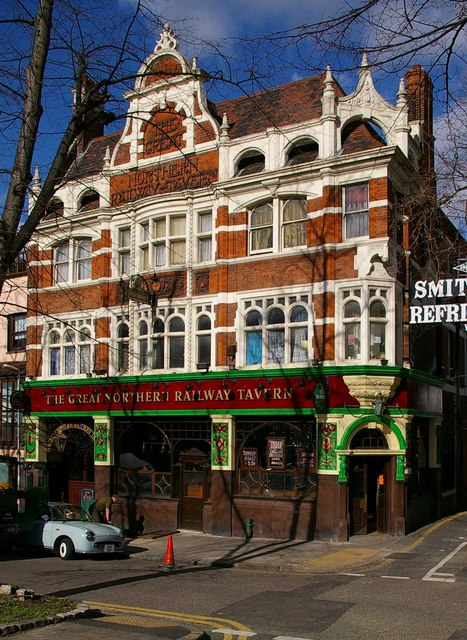
- Great Northern Railway Tavern, Hornsey

- Location within Greater London
- Area: 1.06 km^{2} (0.41 sq mi)
- Population: 12,659 (2011 Census Ward only)
  - Density: 11,942/km^{2} (30,930/sq mi)
- OS grid reference: TQ305894
  - Charing Cross: 10 km (6.2 mi) South
- London borough: Haringey
- Ceremonial county: Greater London
- Region: London
- Country: England
- Sovereign state: United Kingdom
- Post town: LONDON
- Postcode district: N8
- Dialling code: 020
- Police: Metropolitan
- Fire: London
- Ambulance: London
- UK Parliament: Hornsey and Friern Barnet
- London Assembly: Enfield and Haringey

Hornsey (/ˈhɔːrnzi/) is a district of north London, England, in the London Borough of Haringey. It is an inner-suburban, for the most part residential, area centred 10 km (6.2 mi) north of Charing Cross. It adjoins green spaces Queen's Wood to the west and Alexandra Park to the north, and lies in the valley of the now-culverted River Moselle. The central core of the area is known as Hornsey Village.

== Locale ==
Originally a village, it grew up along Hornsey High Street- at the eastern end of which is the churchyard and tower of the former St Mary's parish church, which was first mentioned in 1291. At the western end is Priory Park. This was the administrative centre of the historically broad parish.

North of Hornsey High Street, and immediately to its south, some of the area is public sector housing, surrounded by the late-Victorian terraces developed by builders such as John Farrer. Between the western end of the High Street and the bottom of Muswell Hill, the character of the area changes; most being part of the Warner Estate built up with large late-Victorian houses. To the south west of the High Street is Priory Park.

The High Street has a variety of shops, coffee shops, restaurants and pubs, the oldest being the Three Compasses. The eastern section retains strips of grassed areas.

St Mary's Tower is all that remains of St Mary's Church. The nave was demolished in Victorian times and a grey stone church was built on the corner of Church Lane and Hornsey High Street. The tower was retained as there were not enough funds raised for a new bell tower. However, in the late '60s the Victorian church was demolished and St Mary's school was built on the site.

Hornsey also has a Bowling Club which is situated on land owned by the London Diocesan Fund, part of the Diocese of London. The London Diocesan Fund had expressed an interest in building new homes on the site of the Bowling Club in 2015.

The park was originally opened in 1896 as the Middle Lane Pleasure Grounds. In 1926 the western section was added after the acquisition of a piece of land known as Lewcock's Field. The expanded park was renamed Priory Park The park was created in two sections. Two parcels of land at the eastern and southern ends were purchased in 1891 by the Borough of Hornsey at the instigation of Henry Reader Williams and opened in 1896 as the Middle Lane Pleasure Grounds. In 1926 the western section was added after the acquisition of a piece of land known as Lewcock's Field. During World War 1 this had been requisitioned by the council for allotments. After the war an initial plan for the council to develop the field for housing was dropped on grounds of cost, and an expanded park was renamed Priory Park in 1926. Priory Park is, along with Alexandra Park, the main park serving the area. It is a 6.5-hectare site. Two key events that happen in the park annually are the YMCA Fun Run and the Carter's Steam Fair. It has a cafe, kid's paddling pool and tennis courts.

Hornsey is served by six major churches including Hornsey Parish Church, Holy Innocents, Moravian, Middle Lane Methodist, St John The Baptist Greek Orthodox Church and Campsbourne Baptist Church. Mosques in the area include Wightman Road Mosque and Diyanet Camii.

== Geography ==
There are various views as to the location of Hornsey's current boundaries. The northern and eastern boundaries are relatively uncontentious. Although the eastern boundary of the parish was Green Lanes, it is alleged by some that these are now restricted by Alexandra Park and the Great Northern Railway respectively. The southern and western boundaries are less clear cut. A recent version of those boundaries was provided by local opinion as expressed in a small residents' survey undertaken as part of the application for the Crouch End Neighbourhood Forum. It offers a contemporary view of where local residents see the boundary between Hornsey and Crouch End and so defines the southern and western boundaries. The area defined is almost identical to that presented by one individual on a personal Google Map. Both closely resemble the post-19th-century Anglican parish and refer to former methods of property reference such as the layout of building schemes (developers' estates).

== Parish ==
Hornsey was an ancient parish in the county of Middlesex. It was both a civil parish, used for administrative purposes, and an ecclesiastical parish of the Church of England.

=== Civil parish ===
Hornsey Parish was probably formed in about the thirteenth century at the time a church was built in the village of Hornsey. The Parish fell within the Ossulstone Hundred of Middlesex, and in later times it was part of the Finsbury division of the Hundred. The Hornsey Parish boundary ran from Stoke Newington, in the south, through Stroud Green to Highgate in the west, and from near Colney Hatch in the north, past Muswell Hill, and a detached portion of Clerkenwell Parish, eastwards to the Tottenham Parish border and then along Green Lanes back to Stoke Newington. In the north a field called Hornsey Detached No.1 stretched up to Colney Hatch and at the southern end there were another two fields, Hornsey Detached Nos. 2 and 3 by Newington Green. The parish also owned another field in Canonbury, Islington, which was surrendered to the Parish by Sir Thomas Draper, Bt., in 1668.

The vestry of the parish was entrusted with various civil administrative functions from the 17th century. Unusually the parish was divided between the Highgate (upper) side and the Hornsey (lower) side, and separate vestry officers appointed for each side. After 1837 the civil administration changed. The Hornsey vestry established a Public Health and Drainage committee in 1851; this committee only had a short life as it was replaced, in 1854, with a Highways Board, and a full Local Board was established in 1867. The Local Board gave way to the Urban District Council in 1894/5 which governed the Parish until 1903, when it became obtained Borough status. By this time South Hornsey had separated and become an autonomous local authority from Hornsey, which had become part of the Poor Law Union of Edmonton.

In 1865, the southern part of the parish, consisting of the Brownswood Park area and the detached pieces surrounded by the parishes of Hackney and Stoke Newington adopted the Local Government Act 1858, and formed the South Hornsey Local Board.

The Local Government Act 1894 reconstituted the two local board districts as urban districts, and divided the parish into the two civil parishes of Hornsey and South Hornsey.

In 1899 the South Hornsey urban district and civil parish were absorbed by the Metropolitan Boroughs of Stoke Newington and Islington in the County of London. At the same time the detached part of the parish of Clerkenwell was added to Hornsey.

The urban district and civil parish of Hornsey remained in Middlesex, being incorporated as the Municipal Borough of Hornsey in 1903. The civil parish was abolished when the borough became part of the London Borough of Haringey in 1965.

=== Ecclesiastical parish ===
The ancient parish, dedicated to St Mary, was in the Diocese of London. From 1862, as the population of Hornsey increased, a number of new parishes were formed:

- Hornsey, Christ Church, Crouch End in 1862
- Hornsey, Holy Innocents in 1877
- Hornsey, St Peter in 1898
- Hornsey, St Luke in 1903
- Hornsey St George in 1910

The parishes of Hornsey Rise and Hornsey Road were formed in 1865 and 1866 respectively. The two parishes were formed out of part of the area of the ancient parish of Islington.

In addition, as the population of neighbouring areas increased, parts of Hornsey parish were included in new parishes:

- Highgate in 1834
- Muswell Hill, St James in 1843
- Stoke Newington, St Matthias in 1849
- Highgate, All Saints in 1874
- Brownswood Park in 1875 was formed from the southern part of the parish
- Stroud Green in 1881
- Harringay in 1892

== History ==
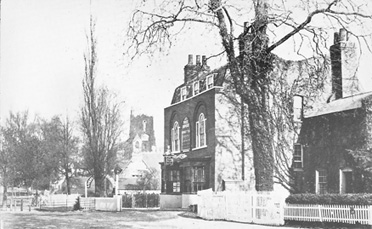
Hornsey High Street in 1873, with the old Three Compasses pub building in the centre

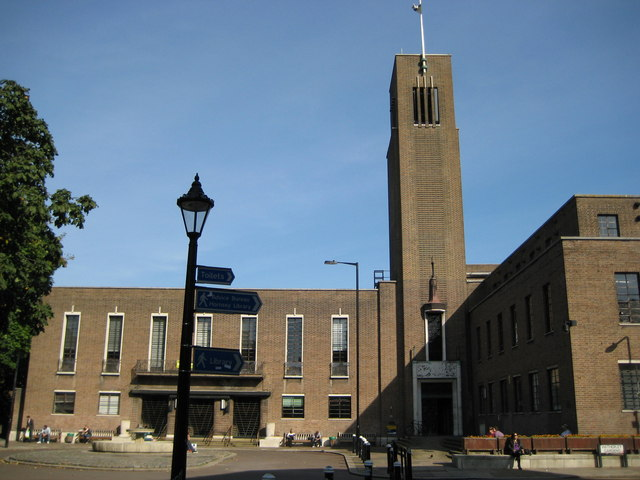
Hornsey Town Hall, completed in 1935

The name Hornsey has its origin in the Saxon period and is derived from the name of a Saxon chieftain called Haering. Haering's Hege meant Haering's enclosure. The earliest-written form of the name was recorded as Harenhg' in about 1195. Its development thereafter gave rise to the modern-day names of Harringay (the district of London), the London Borough of Haringey and Hornsey. The church was first mentioned in 1291. Hornsey Village developed along what is now Hornsey High Street, and in the seventeenth century it was bisected by the New River that crossed the village in three places: first at the end of Nightingale Lane, secondly from behind the Three Compasses and lastly, as it does now, at the bottom of Tottenham Lane. The village grew dramatically after about 1860 and eventually merged with the separate settlement at Crouch End (first mentioned in 1465), to form an urban area in the middle of the parish.

Hornsey was a much larger original ancient parish than today's electoral ward of the same name. These entities are smaller than the Municipal Borough of Hornsey which co-governed the area with Middlesex County Council from 1889 until 1965, since when the name refers, as a minimum, to the London neighbourhood with a high street at its traditional heart to the west of Hornsey railway station. Its parish ranked sixth in size, of more than forty in Ossulstone, the largest hundred in Middlesex and was a scattered semi-rural community of 2,716 people in 1801. By 1901 the population had risen about eightfold in forty years, reaching 87,626, by which time new localities/districts, mainly Crouch End and Muswell Hill, were popularly becoming considered distinct from Hornsey. The N8 postcode district, the current form of Hornsey ward as devised from time-to-time for equal representation (electorate) across wards of the Borough, and the choice of other railway and tube stations towards, on these definitions, outer parts create conflicting definitions of Hornsey and it is unclear whether since 1965 the term is distinct from Hornsey Village, a term unrecognised by some residents.

The old parish used to have two small detached parts immediately beyond and within Stoke Newington Parish. In the 1840s the parish had 5,937 residents, slightly reduced by the loss of Finsbury Park but comprised 2,362 acres (9.56 km^{2}) taking in besides its own village, the established hamlets of Muswell Hill, Crouch End, Stroud Green, and part of Highgate.

In the later eighteenth and the first half of the nineteenth century, Hornsey became an increasingly popular area for wealthy merchants wanting a comfortable home close to London. With them came the laying out some large estates and subsequently the development of large villas along the principal routes. The arrival of the railway in 1850 made Hornsey a commuter town and accelerated urban development. In the late 1860s, large areas of Hornsey were developed by freehold land societies for working-class housing including Abyssinia (later known as Hornsey Vale) and Campsbourne. Development of a generally much more middle-class nature continued throughout the Victorian and Edwardian eras with the final gaps being filled during interwar period. Most of the early freehold land estates have since been demolished for public housing, or in the case of Abyssinia (Hornsey Vale) to accommodate the Hornsey School for Girls.

The tower of the original parish church still stands in its ancient graveyard in Hornsey High Street, at the centre of the old village. One-time well-known poets buried in the churchyard include English poet Samuel Rogers and Dutch poet Gerrit van de Linde. Thomas Moore's daughter Barbara is buried but the location has been lost.

Other notable places are the former Hornsey Town Hall in Crouch End. On the north side of the High Street was the old public bath and wash house (not to be confused with Hornsey Road Baths & Laundry 1 1/2 miles (2.4 km) away on Hornsey Road) which was demolished to make way for a new housing scheme and Sainsbury's. Opened in 1932, it had 33,000 users a year in the 1950s. A small group of residents wished Haringey Council to purchase the site and install arts and crafts studios, with a gallery, primarily for local artists.

For 1978 to 2002 in the borough, having in its initial 13 years no wards mentioning Hornsey, three wards bearing the name existed and so popularised it among bordering, competing areas with newer names, strongly reflecting their historic, shared identity:

1. Hornsey Central
2. Hornsey Vale
3. South Hornsey

=== Economic development ===
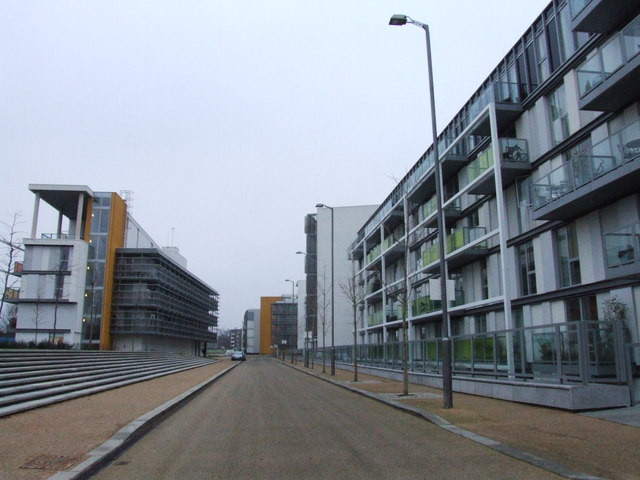
21st-century housing in Chadwell Lane, Hornsey

In the 1840s a section of a major new railway line from London to the north, the Great Northern Railway (Great Britain), was constructed right through Hornsey near to the centre of the village, and a station - the first out of London on the line - was built to serve it on Tottenham Lane, opened on 8 August 1850. It was successful and sidings on both sides of the line were constructed s well as goods depots, so Hornsey became somewhat of a railway town. This tradition continues: two major maintenance depots for the new electric trains running from Finsbury Park to Brighton have been constructed beside the main line.

In 1870 the first shop of what would become the David Greig national grocery chain, once a rival to Sainsbury's, was opened in 32 Hornsey High Street by Greig's mother.

In 1951 the first Lotus Cars factory was established in stables behind the Railway Hotel (now No5 Dining) on Tottenham Lane. The company was formed as Lotus Engineering Ltd by Colin Chapman. The Railway Hotel pub was owned by Chapman's father. In its early days, Lotus sold cars aimed at private racers and trialists. Its early road cars could be bought as kits, in order to save on purchase tax. Lotus moved to Cheshunt in 1959, and to Hethel in Norfolk in 1966. Adjacent to the pub was the first Lotus showroom. The site is now being developed by Fifth State as the Lotus Buildings and will celebrate the Lotus heritage with a community cafe, new public spaces and housing for students.

Established in 1964, Hornsey Co-operative Credit Union was Britain's oldest credit union, until it merged with London Capital Credit Union in 2013.

Since 2000 Hornsey's residential developments have been architecturally diverse and overall accommodative of a diverse range of the local community. This has included estates of more than 50 homes with a proportion available under social housing and affordable housing schemes.

The Hornsey Water Treatment Works were developed alongside the New River, the water supply system constructed in the 17th century that brings water from Hertfordshire to London. The brick buildings associated with the works were the last constructed by the New River Company before the Metropolitan Water Board took over in 1904. They are now run by Thames Water and still supply some of London's water.

== Rail transport ==
The East Coast Main Line from London King's Cross to the east Midlands, northern England and Scotland, successor to the GNR mentioned above, crosses Hornsey. Local commuter and regional services are provided from Hornsey railway station by Great Northern into Central London ending in Moorgate and towards Hertfordshire. A change at Finsbury Park station gives direct access on the overground lines to central London, south London and Brighton. Turnpike Lane tube station on the Piccadilly Line is the nearest Underground station.

== Education ==
Secondary schools serving the area include Greig City Academy, Hornsey School for Girls and Highgate Wood Secondary School. Primary schools within Hornsey include Campsbourne Primary School and St Mary's Primary School.

Hornsey has its own active local learned Society, Hornsey Historical Society.

== Transport and locale ==
=== Nearest places ===
- Crouch End
- Alexandra Palace
- Muswell Hill
- Wood Green
- Harringay
- Finsbury Park
- Stroud Green

=== Nearest stations ===
- Hornsey
- Harringay
- Turnpike Lane
- Buses 29, 41, 91, 141, 144, W3 and W5 serve Hornsey, while night buses N41 and N91 serve Hornsey also.

== Sources ==
- Guide to the Local Administrative Units of England, Vol.1, Frederic Youngs, London, 1979
