= Julie Dorrington =

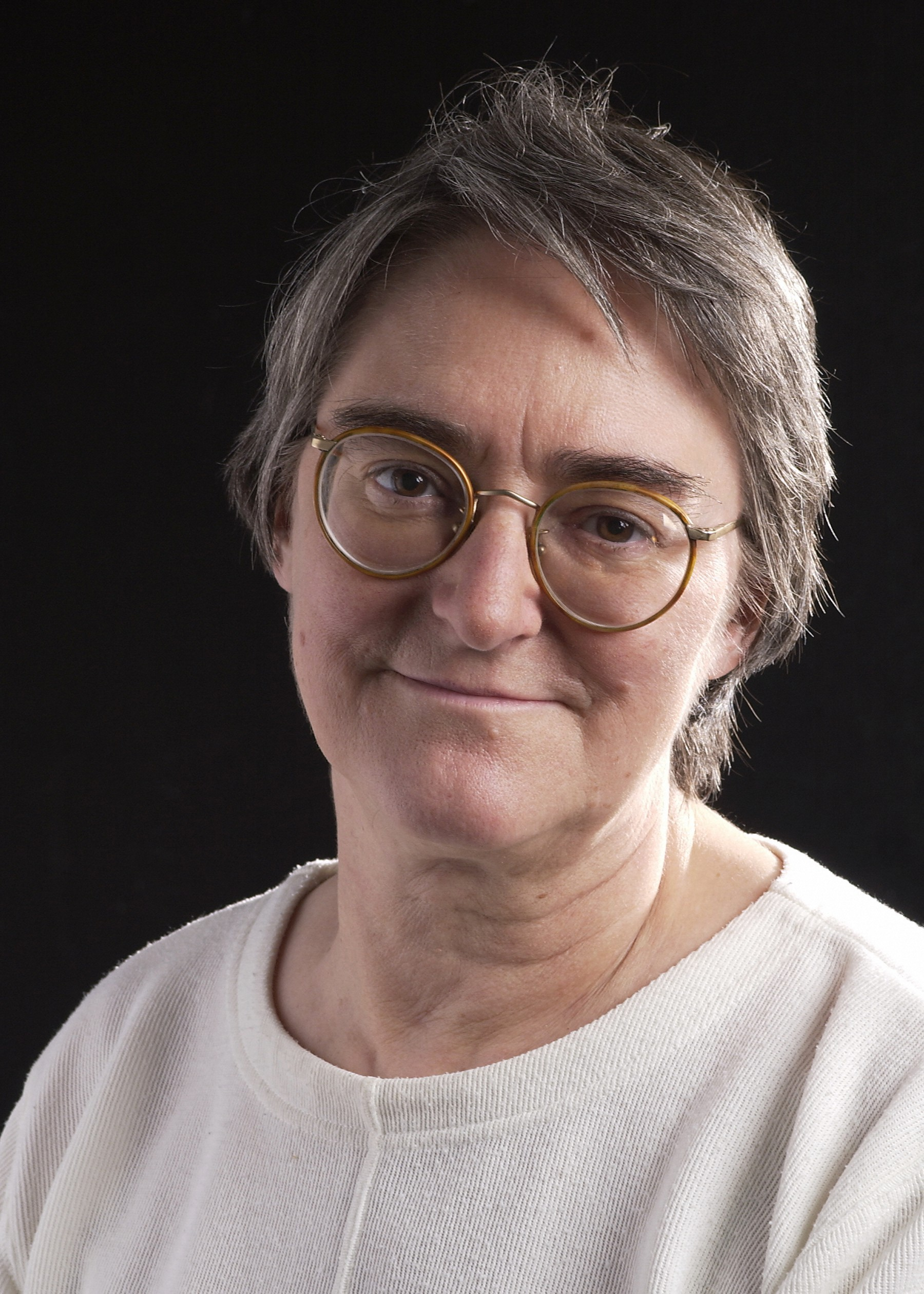
- Born: 19 October 1940; Northampton, England
- Died: 21 December 2010 (aged 70)

Julie Dorrington (19 October 1940 – 21 December 2010), aclinical photographer, was one of the founder members of the Institute of Medical Illustrators.

== Early life and education ==
Julie Dorrington was born in Northampton but after World War II her family moved to Muswell Hill in North London. Her father was an engineer for the BBC at Alexandra Palace. Her mother taught dressmaking and later founded the New Embroidery Group. An only child, she attended Hornsey High Grammar School followed by a photography course at Regent Street Polytechnic. Dorrington then qualified as a medical photographer through the Institute of Incorporated Photographers (now the British Institute of Professional Photography), and completed her apprenticeship at St Bartholomew's Hospital, London.

== Career ==
After a stint in commercial photography, Dorrington soon changed fields, and started her traineeship at St Bartholomew's Hospital where she met Norman K Harrison, Peter Cull and David Tredinnic, key players in the establishment of medical illustration as a profession. Dorrington had a long career at St Bartholomew's and held the role of Deputy Director of the Department of Medical Illustration. This led her to teaching clinical photography at the London School of Medical Photography for 16 years. It was also her involvement as an associate founding member of the Institute of Medical Illustrators (IMI), that demonstrates her professional impact. Dorrington had many administrative and leadership roles within the organisation, which she was a member of for 42 years. She was secretary/registrar of the institute for 40 years.

After 30 years at St. Bartholomew's, Dorrington made a move to Graves Medical Audiovisual in Chelmsford, where she managed the National Medical Slidebank collection of 12,000 clinical images. Just 3 years later, the collection was moved to Wellcome Trust's Medical Photographic Library (now known as Wellcome Images). Here, Dorrington established the medical contemporary collection. She spent 12 years at the Wellcome Trust, until her retirement in 2005.

== Honours and awards ==
For her outstanding contribution to IMI, Dorrington was the first recipient of the Norman K Harrison Gold Medal in 1972.

In 1985 Dorrington was awarded Honorary Fellowship to the IMI.

In recognition of Dorrington's outstanding contribution to the field of medical imaging, Wellcome Images named its clinical photography award after her in 2016.
