= Shariah TV =

TV program

Shariah TV was a Muslim-themed talk show, presented by Tazeen Ahmad, broadcast on a late-night slot on Channel 4. The audience, made up of British Muslims, asked a panel questions relating to life as a Muslim in Britain. Channel 4 frequently presented the panel as scholars in Islam; however, many have not attained the necessary qualification to be termed a scholar, and some themselves would refuse to accept such a title, which carries great weight.

The series raised sensitive and diverse issues such as homosexuality, free speech, and anti-terrorism legislation.

It returned on 5 June 2007 (at 00:10) for a four-part special from the city of Jerusalem.

The last series began on 15 July 2008, and was broadcast from New York City.

== See also ==
- Ajmal Masroor
- Channel 4
