= Illustration =

Depiction made by an artist

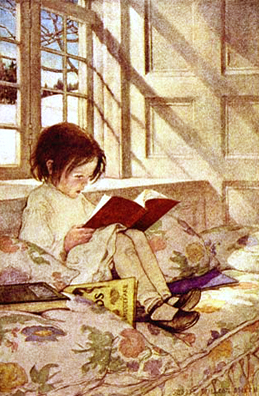
A Child's Garden of Verses illustration ca. 1905 by Jessie Willcox Smith (1863–1935)

An illustration is a decoration, interpretation, or visual explanation of a text, concept, or process, designed for integration in print and digitally published media, such as posters, flyers, magazines, books, teaching materials, animations, video games and films. An illustration is typically created by an illustrator. Digital illustrations are often used to make websites and apps more user-friendly, such as the use of emojis to accompany digital type. Illustration also means providing an example; either in writing or in picture form.

The origin of the word "illustration" is late Middle English (in the sense ‘illumination; spiritual or intellectual enlightenment’): via Old French from Latin illustratio(n-), from the verb illustrare.

== Illustration styles ==
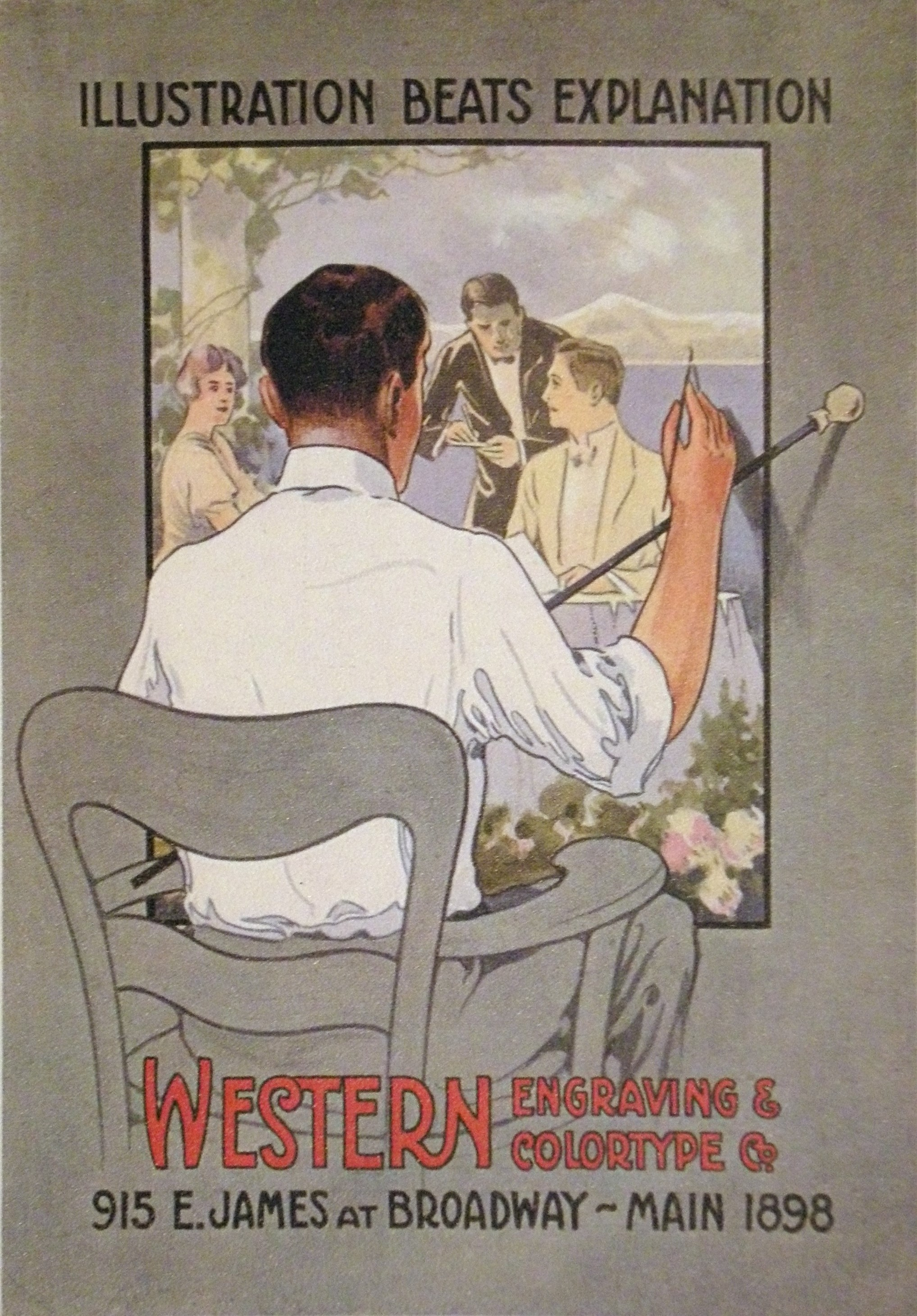
"Illustration beats explanation" Western Engraving & Colortype Co. (1916)

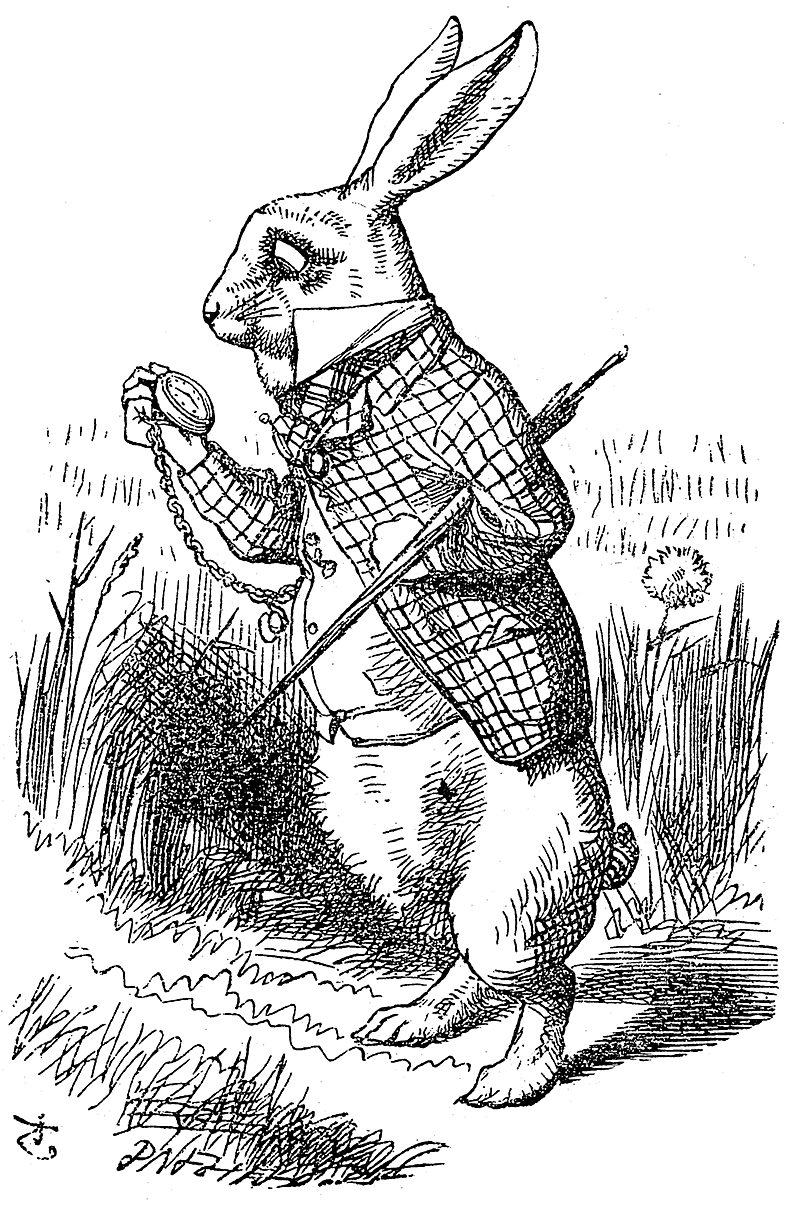
The White Rabbit from Alice in Wonderland, illustrated by John Tenniel (1820–1914)

Contemporary illustration uses a wide range of styles and techniques, including drawing, painting, printmaking, collage, montage, digital design, multimedia, 3D modelling. Depending on the purpose, illustration may be expressive, stylised, realistic, or highly technical.

Specialist areas include:

- Architectural illustration
- Archaeological illustration
- Book illustration
- Botanical illustration
- Concept art
- Fashion illustration
- Information graphics
- Livre d'art
- Technical illustration
- Medical illustration
- Narrative illustration
- Picture books
- Scientific illustration

== Technical and scientific illustration ==
Illustration of the process of generating a scientific illustration of an oviposition by a parasitic wasp (Xenomorphia resurrecta) into a fly puparium based on 3D rendering of micro-CT data of fossil specimens.

Technical and scientific illustration communicates information of a technical or scientific nature. This may include exploded views, cutaways, fly-throughs, reconstructions, instructional images, component designs, diagrams. The aim is "to generate expressive images that effectively convey certain information via the visual channel to the human observer".

Technical and scientific illustration is generally designed to describe or explain subjects to a nontechnical audience, so it must provide "an overall impression of what an object is or does, to enhance the viewer's interest and understanding."

In contemporary illustration practice, 2D and 3D software are often used to create accurate representations that can be updated easily and reused in a variety of contexts.

There is a Guild of Natural Science Illustrators and Association of Medical Illustrators. The Association of Medical Illustrators states that the median salary is $70,650, while for science illustrators it is $72,277. Types of jobs range from research institutes to museums to animation.

Exploded-view diagram of a gear pump (c. 2007)

== Illustration as fine art ==
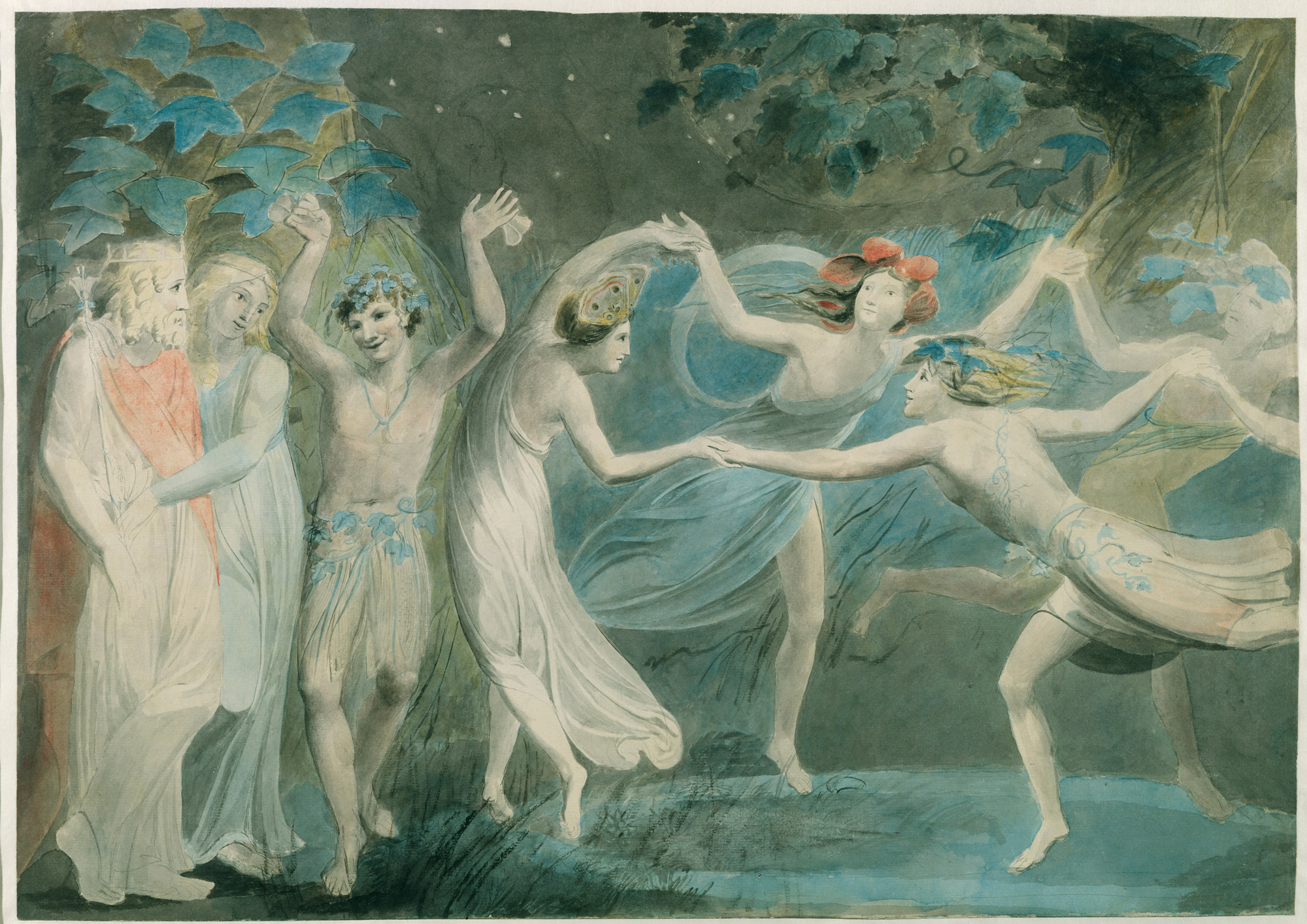
Oberon, Titania and Puck with Fairies Dancing by William Blake (1786)

In the art world, illustration has at times been considered of less importance than graphic design and fine art.

Today, however, due in part to the growth of the graphic novel and video game industries, as well as increased use of illustration in magazines and other publications, illustration is now becoming a valued art form, capable of engaging a global market.

Original illustration art has been known to attract high prices at auction. The US artist Norman Rockwell's painting "Breaking Home Ties" sold in a 2006 Sotheby's auction for US$15.4 million. Many other illustration genres are equally valued, with pinup artists such as Gil Elvgren and Alberto Vargas, for example, also attracting high prices.

== History ==
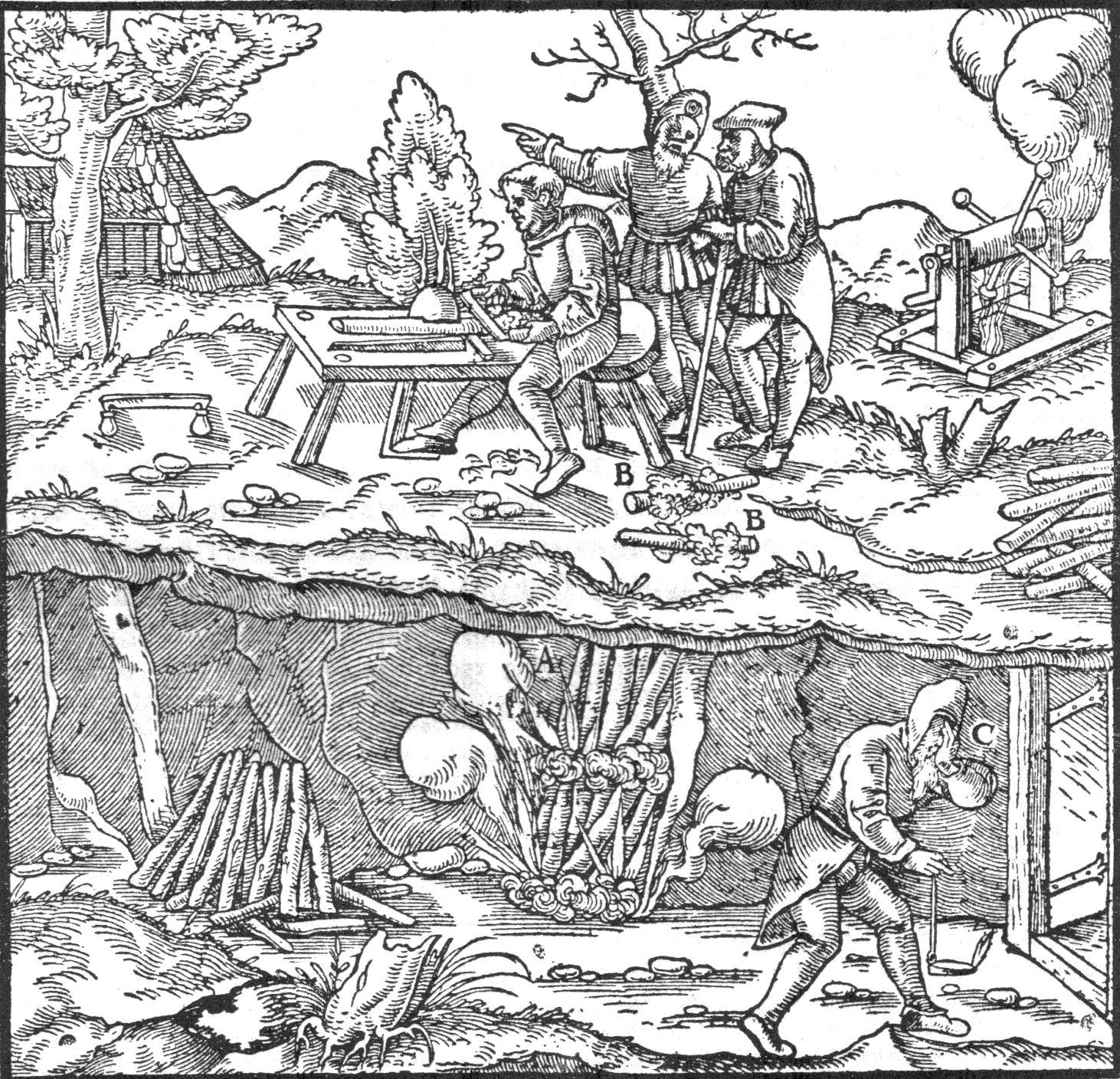
An engraving by Georgius Agricola or Georg Bauer (1494–1555), illustrating the mining practice of fire-setting

Historically, the art of illustration is closely linked to the industrial processes of printing and publishing.

=== Early history ===
The illustrations of medieval codices were known as illuminations, and were individually hand-drawn and painted. With the invention of the printing press during the 15th century, books became more widely distributed, and often illustrated with woodcuts.

Some of the earliest illustrations come from the time of ancient Egypt (Khemet) often as hieroglyph. A classic example of illustrations exists from the time of The Tomb of Pharaoh Seti I, c. 1294 BC to 1279 BC, who was father of Ramses II, born 1303 BC.

1600s Japan saw the origination of Ukiyo-e, an influential illustration style characterised by expressive line, vivid colour and subtle tones, resulting from the ink-brushed wood block printing technique. Subjects included traditional folk tales, popular figures and everyday life. Hokusai's The Great Wave off Kanagawa is a famous image of the time.

During the 16th and 17th centuries in Europe, the main reproduction processes for illustration were engraving and etching. In 18th Century England, a notable illustrator was William Blake (1757–1827), who used relief etching. By the early 19th century, the introduction of lithography substantially improved reproduction quality.

=== 19th century ===
In Europe, notable figures of the early 19th Century were John Leech, George Cruikshank, Dickens illustrator Hablot Knight Browne, and, in France, Honoré Daumier. All contributed to both satirical and "serious" publications. At this time, there was a great demand for caricature drawings encapsulating social mores, types and classes.

The British humorous magazine Punch (1841–2002) built on the success of Cruikshank's Comic Almanac (1827–1840) and employed many well-regarded illustrators, including Sir John Tenniel, the Dalziel Brothers, and Georges du Maurier. Although all fine art trained, their reputations were gained primarily as illustrators.

Historically, Punch was most influential in the 1840s and 1850s. The magazine was the first to use the term "cartoon" to describe a humorous illustration and its widespread use led to John Leech being known as the world's first "cartoonist". In common with similar magazines such as the Parisian Le Voleur, Punch realised good illustration sold as well as good text. With publication continuing into the 21st Century, Punch chronicles a gradual shift in popular illustration, from reliance on caricature to sophisticated topical observation.

=== The "Golden Age" ===
From the early 1800s newspapers, mass-market magazines, and illustrated books had become the dominant consumer media in Europe and the New World. By the 20th century, developments in printing technology freed illustrators to experiment with color and rendering techniques. These developments in printing affected all areas of literature from cookbooks, photography and travel guides, as well as children's books. Also, due to advances in printing, it became more affordable to produce color photographs within books and other materials. By 1900, almost 100 percent of paper was machine-made, and while a person working by hand could produce 60-100lbs of paper per day, mechanization yielded around 1,000lbs per day. Additionally, in the 50-year period between 1846 and 1916, book production increased 400% and the price of books was cut in half.

In America, this led to a "golden age of illustration" from before the 1880s until the early 20th century. A small group of illustrators became highly successful, with the imagery they created considered a portrait of American aspirations of the time. Among the best-known illustrators of that period were N.C. Wyeth and Howard Pyle of the Brandywine School, James Montgomery Flagg, Elizabeth Shippen Green, J. C. Leyendecker, Violet Oakley, Maxfield Parrish, Jessie Willcox Smith, John Rea Neill, and Paul Jouve.

== See also ==
- Association of Illustrators
- Association of Medical Illustrators
- Comic book illustration
- Communication design
- Graphic design
- Illustrators
- Institute of Medical Illustrators
- Posters
- Society of Illustrators
