= George Gray (footballer, born 1925) =

English footballer

Personal information
- Full name: George James Pope Gray
- Date of birth: 7 July 1925
- Place of birth: Sunderland, England
- Date of death: 1995 (aged 69)
- Place of death: Kettering, England
- Position: Wing half

Senior career*
| Years | Team | Apps | (Gls) |
| 1945–1947 | Derby County | 0 | (0) |
| 1947–1951 | Grimsby Town | 3 | (0) |
| 1951–1953 | Swindon Town | 45 | (0) |
| 1953–1954 | Darlington | 6 | (0) |
- * Club domestic league appearances and goals

George James Pope Gray (7 July 1925 – 1995) was an English footballer who played in the Football League as a wing half for Grimsby Town, Swindon Town and Darlington.

== Life and career ==
Gray was born in Sunderland, the son of George Gray and his wife Vera Lister. Gray senior played League football as a wing half for Swansea Town and Northampton Town in the 1920s, and went on to become trainer of Sunderland.

Gray began his senior career as an amateur with Derby County in 1945, but left the club two years later, without having represented them in the league, and joined First Division club Grimsby Town. He made his debut in October 1950, some three and a half years later, by which time they were playing the Second Division, and played twice more before moving on to Third Division South club Swindon Town at the end of the season.

He played intermittently at the start of the 1951–52 season, but established himself in the first team ahead of Ted Batchelor and appeared in most of Swindon's matches from mid-December onwards. He helped the team reach the fifth round (last 16) of the 1951–52 FA Cup, a run which included wins against Second Division runners-up Cardiff City and First Division Stoke City. He kept his place at the start of the next season, but Batchelor was preferred from October onwards, and Gray finished his Swindon career with 53 appearances in all competitions.

Gray returned to the north-east of England to sign for Darlington in July 1953. He made six league appearances in his only season with the club.

He died in Kettering, Northamptonshire, in 1995 at the age of 69. (Note: Gray's death was registered in April 1995, in the Kettering registration district.)
