= George Grey (disambiguation) =

Sir George Grey (1812–1898) was the British Governor of Cape Colony, South Australia and New Zealand.

George Grey may also refer to:

- George Grey, 2nd Earl of Kent (1454–1505), English nobleman and soldier
- George Grey, 5th Earl of Stamford (1737–1818), British peer
- George Grey, 6th Earl of Stamford (1765–1845), British peer and politician, son of the above
- Sir George Grey, 1st Baronet (1767–1828), British Royal Navy officer
- Sir George Grey, 2nd Baronet (1799–1882), British politician, son of the above
- George Grey, 8th Baron Grey of Groby (1802–1835), British peer, son of the 6th Earl of Stamford
- George Grey (Royal Navy officer, born 1809) (1809–1891), British Royal Navy admiral
- George Grey, 7th Earl of Stamford (1827–1883), British peer, son of the 8th Baron Grey
- George Charles Grey (1918–1944), British politician, Member of Parliament for Berwick-upon-Tweed
- George Grey (skier) (born 1979), Canadian cross-country skier

== See also ==
- George Gray (disambiguation)
