= Ajmal Masroor =

Bangladeshi-born British imam, broadcaster and political activist (born 1971)

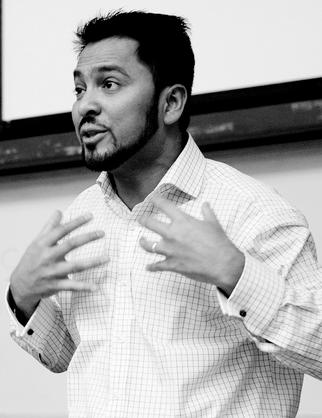
- Masroor in 2008

Personal details
- Born: 19 October 1971 (age 54) Sylhet District, Bangladesh,
- Party: Independent (formerly Liberal Democrats)
- Spouse: Henrietta Szovati
- Children: 2
- Occupation: Imam, television presenter
- Profession: Politician
- Website: www.ajmalmasroor.com

YouTube information
- Years active: 2011-present
- Subscribers: 2,000
- Views: 282,426
- Last updated: 23 May 2021

Ajmal Masroor (Bengali: আজমল মসরূর; born 19 October 1971) is a Bangladeshi-born British imam, broadcaster and political activist. He is known for being a television presenter on political discussions and on Muslim channels.

== Early life ==
Masroor was born in Sylhet District, Bangladesh and came to Britain at the age of one when his parents immigrated from the country. He moved back to Bangladesh a few years later, aged seven, due to his father's concerns about different cultures, and the possibility of losing their Muslim identities. However, they returned when he was 13.

When living in the East End, Masroor experienced racism against the Bangladeshi community in the area, with properties being damaged. He was brought up in Shadwell, and attended the Bluegate Fields School on Cable Street. He is the oldest of six children. At the age of 19, his father attempted to force him into a marriage in Bangladesh, but was unsuccessful because Masroor challenged his father, saying forced marriage is not acceptable in Islam. He then married a Hungarian, Henrietta Szovati (who had converted to Islam), and they now have two children.

He went to Hammersmith and West London College to study his GCSEs and A Levels. While studying, he was active in student unions, and founded the college's first Islamic society. Masroor took admission at the School of Oriental and African Studies (SOAS) to study BA politics and Arabic, and then a master's at Birkbeck College in Islamic studies. He also studied relationship counselling with Relate.

== Career ==
Masroor provides relationship counselling and spiritual coaching. He is an author, broadcaster and fundraiser. Masroor runs the Barefoot Institute, which provides support and to Muslim couples, including marriage, divorce and family counselling, mediation, and coaching. His courses use Quranic principles.

Masroor is a travelling imam, who leads Friday prayers at various mosques across the United Kingdom, including Palmers Green mosque, Wightman Road mosque, and Finsbury Park Mosque in London, as well as Abdullah Quilliam Mosque in Liverpool. He is also invited to lead Friday prayers at Leeds Grand Mosque and Greenwich Islamic Centre occasionally.

Masroor joined the Islamic Society of Britain, serving as its chairperson from 2016 to 2019. He stood for the office of secretary general of the Muslim Council of Britain in January 2021.

He was the director of Communities in Action, an organisation founded to empower communities to organise, deliver and realise their full potential. He was the chairman of ChildrenPlus, a charity that focused on providing humanitarian assistance to poverty stricken and most vulnerable children around the world.

Masroor was selected as the Liberal Democrats prospective parliamentary candidate for West Ham at the 2005 general election, but stood down after being criticised for posting on the Muslim Public Affairs Committee forum.

He stood in Bethnal Green and Bow at the 2010 general election, representing the Liberal Democrats, and came second with 10,210 votes (20.1%), behind the Labour candidate, Rushanara Ali, who won with 21,784 votes (42.9%).

He stood in the same seat in the 2017 general election as an independent, coming third with 6.5% of the votes. In 2024, following boundary changes, he stood as an independent in the new Bethnal Green and Stepney constituency, coming a close second with 30.5% of the votes, again behind Rushanara Ali.

Masroor is a broadcaster and regular contributor on various TV and radio channels in the UK. He currently presents his own programmes on Islam Channel and on Channel S, where he presents an English programme called Let's Talk. He is also part of the panel in a programme broadcast by Channel 4, called Shariah TV. On Channel 4, he also presented a programme called Make Me a Muslim, in which he asks six non-Muslims and one lapsed Muslim to follow Islamic teachings for three weeks. On 10 May 2009, Masroor presented a programme called Celebrity Lives - Sharia Style, which was broadcast on BBC One.

He has also appeared on major news channels, such as the BBC and CNN as a commentator on social, political and religious issues. On 30 January 2011, he appeared on the BBC show The Big Questions, and in 2019 he appeared on BBC's Newsnight.

In October 2013, Masroor was alerted by anti-terrorist police that he and a number of other prominent Muslim figures in the UK who had spoken out against Islamist extremism were targeted by a propaganda video created by Al-Shabaab, the terrorist group responsible for the attack on the Westgate shopping mall in Kenya: the video urged jihadists in the UK to take action, citing the murder of Lee Rigby as an example to follow. Interviewed by Al Jazeera, Masroor said of the video: "It is a terrible piece of work and the content is vile and disgusting and horrific in many ways. It is a group of people who are glorifying violence and death. It didn't make me scared. It just made me angry and more determined." He also received a second death threat in 2015, from the ISIS terrorist cell in Iraq and Syria, which led to him moving home, and his family relocating to another country for a short while.

In July 2015, Masroor was interviewed by Nadia Ali on BBC Asian Network about his Ramadan memories.

On 10 April 2026, the West London Islamic Centre - WLIC, in West Ealing, fired him from the Mosque for delivering a Friday sermon in which he said "Iran never invaded its neighbours". He was unable to finish the sermon due to the arguments this comment began. Worshippers asked WLIC management not to have him deliver any sermon again, and they accepted. However on 4 September 2026, he again delivered a sermon at the WLIC in which he apologised for his previous remarks. [source?]

In October 2018, the Muslim World League fired him from the Fitzrovia Mosque for criticising Saudi Arabia and their Crown Prince Mohammed bin Salman, following remarks he made about the disappearance of Jamal Khashoggi and corruption in the Saudi royal family. The Muslim World League released a statement saying, "But since he continued provoking public opinion against the individuals, governments, causing stir in the society, shaming and accusing falsely, no option was left but to stop dealing with him in any way."

Masroor spoke at an event immediately after the murder of Jamal Khashoggi, and said that Mohammed bin Salman was directly responsible for the murder of Khashoggi. Masroor added that Bin Salman should be tried for his crime. He said that Saudi Arabia was ruled by an illegitimate regime, and the civilised world should boycott the country; not sell them arms or intelligence; and should never offer its rulers the red carpet treatment when they come to the UK or Europe.

== Personal life ==
Masroor has a brother, Mustafa Almansur, who was the organiser of the Grenfell Tower protests in 2017.

On 17 December 2015, Masroor was stopped by a U.S. embassy staff from boarding Virgin Atlantic flight at Heathrow Airport to John F. Kennedy International Airport. Masroor was informed that his U.S. business visa had been revoked, and received no further explanation as to why he was being prevented from travelling, despite travelling to the U.S. four times earlier in the year. On 22 December, he was invited to the U.S. embassy to speak about the matter but was still not given a reason, nor an apology. On 13 January 2016, it was reported that he was prevented from travelling to the U.S., and his visa was revoked over concerns about one of his 28,000 Facebook followers. Masroor set up a website, www.flyingwhilemuslim.org.uk, so other Muslims can document any similar experiences they have faced while trying to travel to U.S.

In 2019, the US embassy in London reissued Masroor a valid US visa and welcomed him to travel to the USA any time.

== Awards and nominations ==
In January 2013 and 2015, Masroor was nominated for the Religious Advocate of the Year award at the British Muslim Awards.

== See also ==
- British Bangladeshi
- List of British Bangladeshis
- Islam in England
