= George Seaman Gray =

American minister and author

George Seaman Gray (July 10, 1835 – August 26, 1885) was an American minister and author.

== Biography ==
Gray, eldest son of John and Jane E. (Seaman) Gray, was born in New York City, July 10, 1835. He was prepared for College at the age of fourteen, but was then on account of his youth put into a business house for four years. He entered Yale College in February, 1854 and graduated in 1857.

On leaving College he spent two years in the Auburn Theological Seminary at Auburn, N. Y., and a third year in Union Seminary, New York City. For a year he preached as a stated supply in the suburbs of Portland, Maine, and in the meantime married, May 1, 1861, Sarah Brown, the only daughter of Robert Brown, of Cincinnati, Ohio, and sister of a classmate. Later, he supplied the Presbyterian Church in Englewood, New Jersey, from the spring of 1862, till February, 1863, during the regular pastor's absence, but a constitutional weakness of the throat induced him to relinquish preaching, after this time. He was then solicited to open a preparatory school for boys in Englewood, and spent over three years in that employment. In 1866 he removed to Cincinnati and entered into business, in which he spent the rest of his life. He died in Cincinnati, after a short illness from typhoid fever, August 26, 1885, in his 51st year. His wife survived him, without children.

Gray was an honored elder in the Mount Auburn Presbyterian Church, from December, 1871, until his death, except for a brief interval of voluntary retirement; and as the faithful teacher for half that time of a very large class in the Sunday School exercised a great influence over the young. He published anonymously in 1884 a volume entitled Eight Studies on the Lord's Day. This attracted attention widely as a scholarly and thoughtful defense of the Christian Sabbath.
