= London Islamic Cultural Society =

Mosque in Hornsey, England

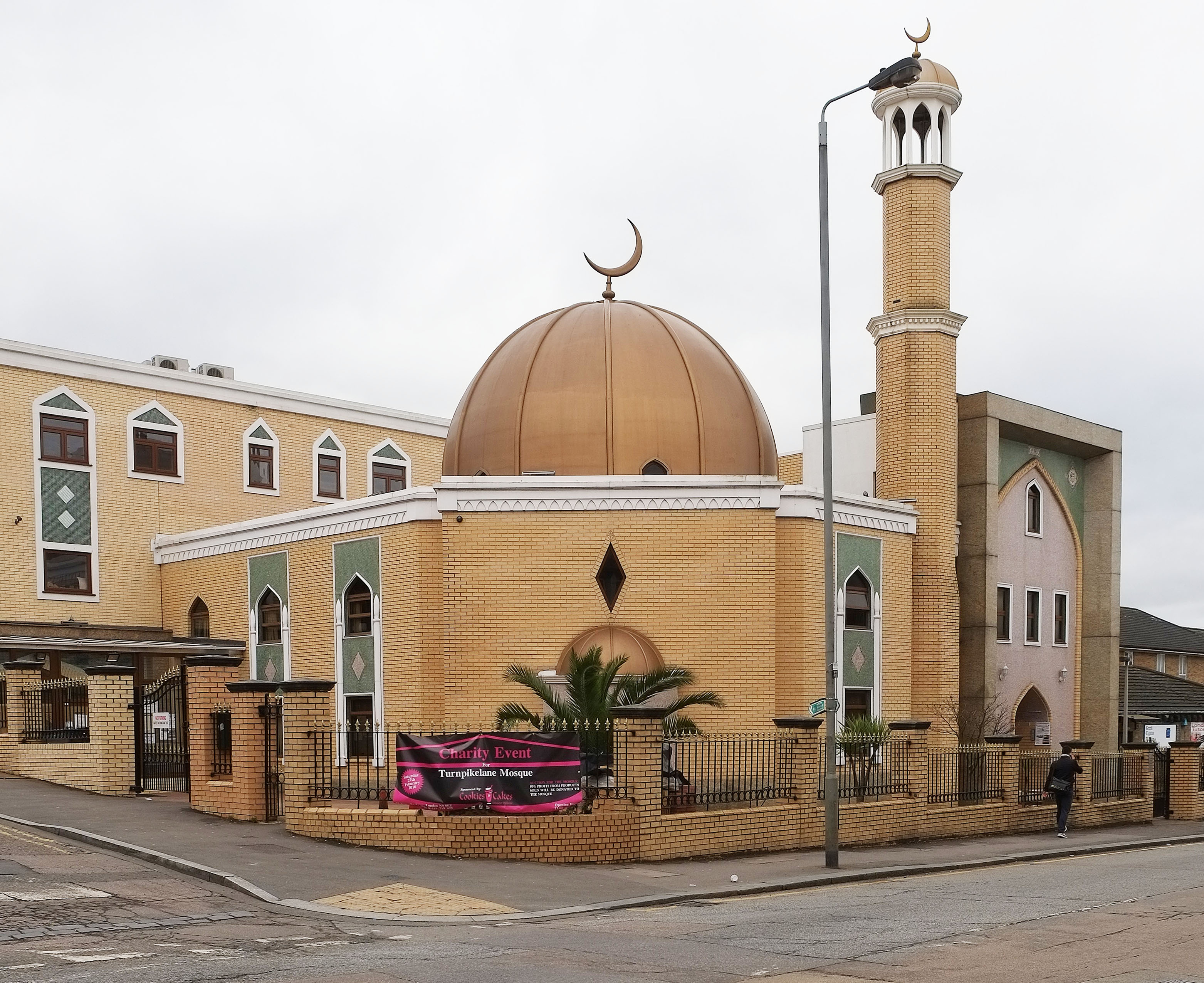

- Location of the mosque in Greater London

Religion
- Affiliation: Sunni Islam
- Ecclesiastical or organizational status: Mosque
- Leadership: Kazi Abdul Qadir (Head Imam); Qari Ishaq Jasat (Imam)
- Status: Active

Location
- Location: 389 Wightman Rd, Harringay Ladder, Haringey, London N8 0HE, England
- Country: United Kingdom
- Interactive map of London Islamic Cultural Society
- Coordinates: 51°35′11″N 0°06′39″W

Architecture
- Type: Mosque architecture
- Style: Islamic; Modern
- Established: 1983 (as a community)
- Groundbreaking: 1987
- Completed: 2013
- Construction cost: c.£3.7 million

Specifications
- Capacity: 2,300 worshippers
- Dome: One
- Minaret: One

Website
- londonislamicculturalsociety.org

The London Islamic Cultural Society, also known as the Wightman Road Mosque, is a Sunni mosque and Islamic community centre in Hornsey, London, England, in the United Kingdom. Completed in 2013, it is Haringey's first purpose-built mosque. The mosque regularly hosts interfaith events and school visits. The mosque was also the first to hold a pop-up vaccine centre in Haringey to encourage those reluctant to be vaccinated to come forward.

== Architecture ==
The current site of the complex includes the main prayer halls and the extension. The pre-extension land was the main site of the mosque from 1987 to 2002. The land adjacent was purchased at a cost of £32,500 and construction started to build what would now be known as the main prayer halls. The exterior is a distinctive pattern in sand yellow bricks, with green mosaic tiles around windows. A golden dome, spanning [-] metres in diameter, crowns the masjid. The minaret rises [-] metres above ground.

== History ==
=== Establishment ===
The London Islamic Cultural Society (LICS) was formed in 1983 in the house of Abdool Alli by a small group of Muslims from Guyana, in South America, who saw the need to bring together its members both culturally and religiously. The primary aim was to engage, communicate and support the diverse community by establishing a Mosque/Cultural centre and to provide essential services which would also benefit the wider multi-ethnic community.

LICS was officially registered as a charity in 1983, governed by its constitution. Before LICS was formed into a charity and subsequently once established, all gatherings and observation of Islamic/Cultural events were held in the home of the president Abdool Alli. As numbers grew, LICS began using school halls where necessary.

=== Park View Road ===
LICS purchased its first centre, a house on Park View Road, N17, in 1985 for £41,260. Funds were raised by donations and interest free loans and were fully paid prior to its sale in 1987. This however very quickly became too small for the progressive, dynamic society as numbers of users grew.

=== Wightman Road ===
LICS purchased 389-395 Wightman Road, N8, the former Wood Green & Hornsey synagogue, at an auction in 1987 for £150,500. Brother Alli and lead Imam, Al Haj Ebrahim McDoom, attended the auction and secured the site. Proceeds from the sale of the Park View Road building, donations and interest free loans collectively freed this building of debt. The centre allowed LICS to provide improved facilities for users and secured their commitment to working in harmony with all schools, faith groups, the council, other agencies, hospitals and the police to secure a brighter and better future for all people in the community. As the cultural centre developed, it was quickly realised that more space was needed for the ever-growing users, in particular better facilities for the sisters and young children who often accompany them.

Following discussions with Haringey Council, in 1991 LICS purchased land adjacent to the existing building for £32,500. LICS raised donations and the land was free of debt shortly after acquisition. Mekaeel Maknoon provided legal guidance. Both brothers provided their services free of charge.

On 15 September 1988, building works commenced. On 12 July 2002, the new mosque was officially opened with representatives from the Council, police, local faith groups and members of the Muslim community. On 25 August the same year, LICS became a trust with a board of trustees. By 2004, LICS successfully raised £1.2 million by interest free loans, donations, and other forms of fundraising. A thanksgiving event was held on 18 July 2004 to celebrate that the mosque was no longer encumbered.

In 2012, LICS announced its commitment to provide additional educational facilities and better accommodation for worshippers. LICS leased a nearby building, Willmott House, and began planning to erect two additional floors above the old mosque to continue services such as the madrassahs, and provide extra capacity for Friday prayer. Feasibility of the new £1.5 million project was investigated as LICS sought planning approval for the local Council to modernise the existing prayer area, including wudu facilities, and works to merge the two buildings. In July 2013 the new extension building works were completed, by Capan Er. The development cost £2.2 million and the project was completed in advance of Ramadan.

== Facilities ==
The mosque has two main halls, one for men and one for women. The female hall is directly above the men's hall, with an Ottoman mezzanine style view overlooking the minbar and the mihrab. A secondary hall is opened for events, Jumuah and Tarawih, with an occasional funeral service taking place. A banqueting hall accommodating 300 (with tables) is on the second floor of the extension. The masjid offers Nikah ceremonies. There are also many classroom/office style rooms above the hall. Madrassas for all types of people for all ages are available, ranging from Hifz, Tajwid, Qira'at, Arabic classes for children and adults. A funeral rite house within the masjid is not available, however, a personal funeral service can be arranged for from an external source by contacting the management. A small bookshop selling Islamic literature, clothing and perfumes is located on the ground floor of the extension. A room, complete with a kitchen and private bathroom, is available for use by guest imams, tarawih imams and any Jamaat that has contacted beforehand and obtained permission. A library containing Islamic literature, literature used for Dawah purposes and literature of other faiths is present. A Braille Quran is also available.

Hornsey railway station is located at a 2-minute walk away. Turnpike Lane tube station is a 10-minute walk from the mosque.

== Management ==
The London Islamic Cultural Society is a registered charity and is managed by a board of trustees. The President is MBE Rabiyah Khan. The Head Imam of the mosque is Kazi Abdul Qadir; and he is supported by imam Qari Ishaq Jasat.

The Khateeb varies weekly, from profound scholars such as Ajmal Masroor and guest imams, to graduated students of the mosques's madrassa. The mosque's previous imam was Shaykh Hasan Ali, from whose class the current imam also graduated.

== Prominent visitors ==
- Queen Camilla, then Duchess of Cornwall
- Rob Wickham, previous Bishop of Edmonton
- David Lammy
- Catherine West, MP for Hornsey and Wood Green
- Sadiq Khan, Mayor of London

== See also ==
- Islam in England
- Islamism in London
- List of mosques in the United Kingdom
