= George Gray (footballer, born 1894) =

English footballer (1894–1972)

Personal information
- Full name: George Robert Gray
- Date of birth: 4 January 1894
- Place of birth: South Hylton, England
- Date of death: 1972 (aged 77–78)
- Place of death: Sunderland, England
- Height: 5 ft 9 in (1.75 m)
- Position: Wing half

Senior career*
Years	Team	Apps	(Gls)
- New Riddick Colliery
191?–1914	Seaham Harbour		
1914–1919	Gillingham	16	(0)
1919–1920	Hartlepools United	26	(1)
1920–1922	Swansea Town	39	(1)
1922–1923	Bury	0	(0)
1923–1924	Northampton Town	11	(0)
1924	Durham City	2	(0)
- Clydebank
- Yoker Athletic
- Rushden Town
- * Club domestic league appearances and goals

George Robert Gray (4 January 1894 – 1972) was an English professional footballer during the early years of the twentieth century. He played in the Football League for Swansea Town, Northampton Town and Durham City. He spent a season in the Southern League with Gillingham, was on the books of Bury without playing for their first team, had a trial with Scottish League club Clydebank, and played North-Eastern League football for Seaham Harbour and Hartlepools United. After his playing career ended he had a lengthy career as a trainer.

== Personal life ==
Gray was born in South Hylton, County Durham, in January 1894, the son of Crosby Gray, a shipwright, and his wife, Isabella. By 1911, his father had died and the 17-year-old Gray was working as a craneboy in the shipyards. He married Vera Lister in 1923. Their son, also a George Gray, played League football as a half back for Grimsby Town, Swindon Town and Darlington in the 1950s. Gray died in Sunderland in 1972.

== Playing career ==
Gray played local football for New Riddick Colliery and North-Eastern League football for Seaham Harbour before signing for Gillingham, for which he made 16 Southern League appearances without scoring before competitive football was abandoned for the duration of the First World War. He served in the Army during the war, and when demobilised returned to County Durham in October 1919 and signed for Hartlepools United. He went on to score once from 26 North-Eastern League matches and make one appearance in the FA Cup.

In September 1920, Gray signed for Swansea Town of the Third Division South. He made his Football League debut playing at right half away to Northampton Town on 25 September – one of five men tried in that position in the first few weeks of the season – but established himself in the team at left half and missed only three matches over the rest of the campaign. In 1921–22, he did not appear until the new year, but did help the team reach the last 16 of the FA Cup. He left Swansea at the end of the season for Second Division club Bury, where he spent a year without first-team football before returning to the Southern Section with Northampton Town. He was unwell at the start of the 1923–24 season, and although he played in the reserves, he did not make his first-team debut until late December, standing in for the rested Frank Newton. He kept his place for the next match, and made nine more appearances as injury cover before the half-back line was rearranged to accommodate the return of regular centre-half Edmund Wood. An unsuccessful trial with Durham City in October 1924, during which he played twice in the Third Division North as a centre forward, put an end to his Football League career. He had a trial with Scottiah League club Clydebank, and played for Junior club Yoker Athletic before returning to England with Rushden Town.

== Career as a trainer ==
He then began a long career as a trainer, with clubs including Bury, Clydebank, Barrow, and South Shields. The 1939 Register records him living in Sunderland and working as a framesmith's striker. When the Sunderland club resumed playing wartime football at their Roker Park ground, Gray acted as trainer on a voluntary basis, and after the war he was appointed full-time. In July 1950, he treated West Indian cricketer Sonny Ramadhin after he was injured during a tour match against Durham, and acted as trainer to the England team when they played Wales at Sunderland's Roker Park ground in November. He remained in post until 1951, and then took full-time charge of the treatment room and did some scouting.
