= Hornsey School for Girls =

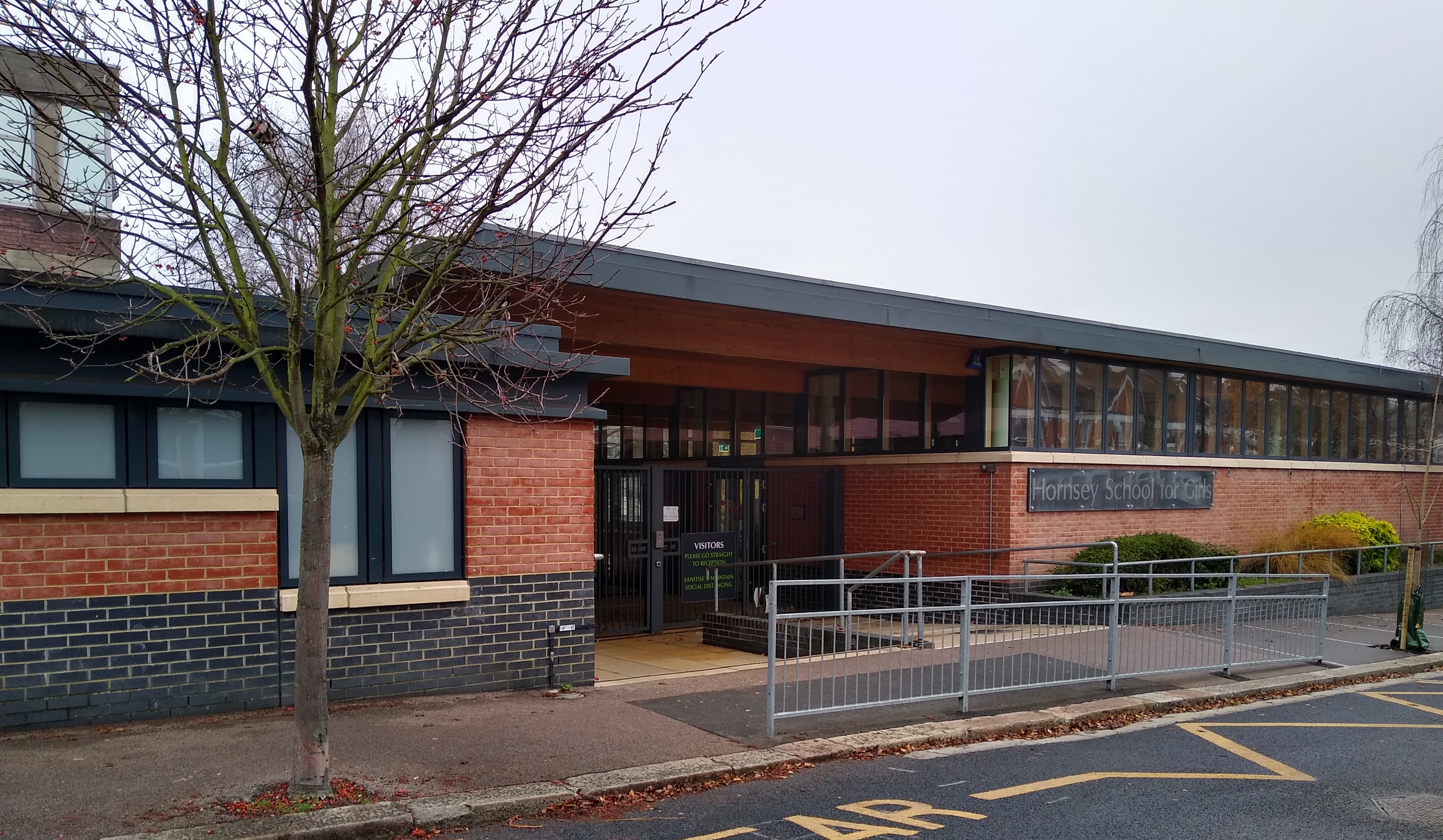

Location
- Inderwick Road; London, N8 9JF; England; 51°34′54″N 0°06′55″W

Information
- Type: Community school, Comprehensive school
- Religious affiliation: all religions
- Established: 1887
- Local authority: Haringey
- Department for Education URN: 102153 Tables
- Ofsted: Reports
- Headteacher: Kuljit Rahelu
- Gender: Girls
- Age: 11 to 16
- Houses: Franklin, Okeeffe, Seacole, Curie, Shelley, Hypatia
- Colours: purple, orange, blue, yellow, green, red
- Telephone: 0208348 6191

Hornsey School for Girls is the only all-girl secondary school located in the borough of Haringey, situated in the Hornsey/Crouch End area of North London.

== History ==
The school began as a girls' grammar school the Hornsey High School for Girls in 1887, by the Church Schools Company (now the United Church Schools Trust). In 1915 it moved to new buildings in Weston Park.

=== Second World War ===
At Hornsey County School the girls were evacuated to Wisbech in Cambridgeshire, with the boys.

=== Transfer of the site ===
In 1968, it moved again, to newly built premises on Inderwick Road on the site of the former village of Abyssinia (later known as Hornsey Vale).

It later became a girls-only comprehensive school.

== Structural problems ==
In 2023, it was discovered that parts of the school were in danger of collapse due to RAAC construction. Remedial works had to be initiated.

== Alumni ==
- Zeinab Badawi, presenter of World News Today, and former presenter of Channel 4 News in the 1990s
- Julie Dorrington, medical photographer
