= Anne Rushout =

British artist (c. 1767–1849)

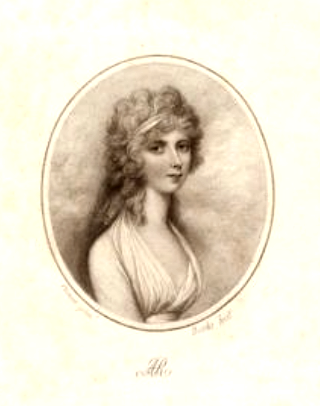
- Anne Rushout, portrait stipple engraving
- Born: c.1767
- Died: 4 April 1849
- Occupation: Watercolorist
- Parents: John Rushout (father); Rebecca Bowles (mother)

Anne Rushout (c.1767–1849) was an English watercolorist and diarist. Many of her works of art were botanical studies. She was also the subject of several paintings by other artists of her time.

== Life ==
Anne was the eldest daughter of three sisters and two brothers of John Rushout, 1st Baron Northwick and his wife Rebecca (née Bowles), in Gloucestershire (or as it was known at that time, Worcestershire).

Anne was a well-educated woman who never married, contrary to her two sisters and one brother, George Rushout, 3rd Baron Northwick. Her other brother, John Rushout, 2nd Baron Northwick, also did not marry. Anne and John lived for many years on the family estate at Northwick Park. Recent research shows, however, that she inherited a life interest in Wanstead Grove, a neighbouring property to Wanstead House, as well as (by codicil) in a London house, both under the will of her maternal uncle, George Bowles (1732 - 1817), a collector of works by Angelica Kauffman, Andrew Plimer, and Henry Bone. George Bowles, whose family's prosperity came initially from a glass-making business, also left an interest in Burford House, Shropshire, to Anne's brother, the Rev. George Rushout (who became Rushout-Bowles to reflect the inheritance from his mother's family), whose son George Rushout, 3rd Baron Northwick succeeded his uncle.

=== Sitter ===
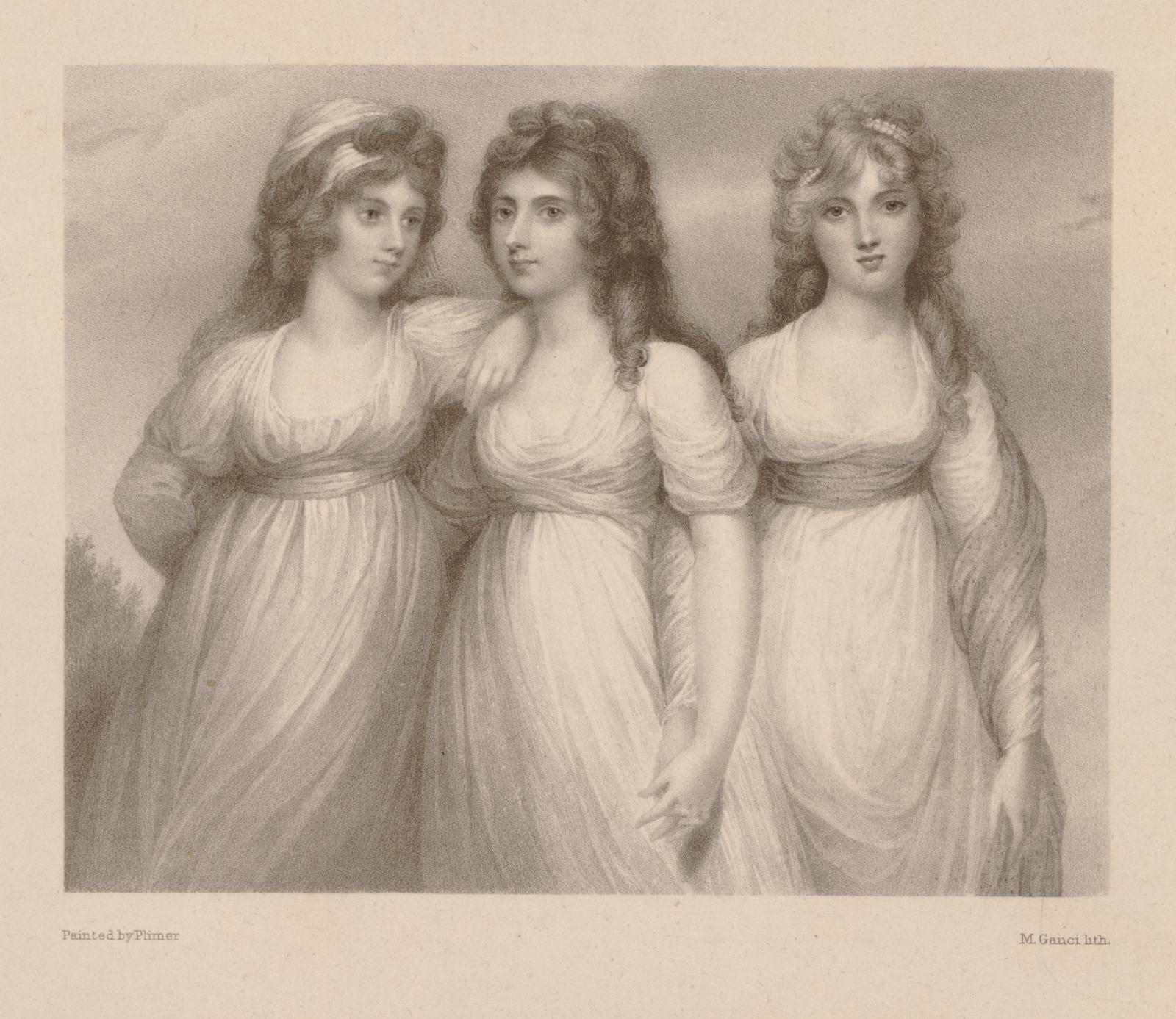
Portrait of the three Rushout sisters. From the left: Anne, Harriet and Elizabeth. (British Museum)

The ladies of the Rushout family, including sisters Anne, Harriet (c.1770) and Elizabeth (1774), and their mother Rebecca, sat for multiple portraits by artists including Angelica Kauffman, Thomas Watson, Andrew Plimer; prints and enamels of these portraits were made, including by Henry Bone. A portrait by Allan Ramsay of a 'Lady Anne Rushout' is of a relative of an earlier generation. Several portraits and prints are held in museums that include the National Portrait Gallery and the British Museum in London.

=== Artist ===
Rushout's watercolors included views of Northwick Park and other properties held by her immediate and extended family and those she visited on her extensive travels. Botanical studies were also favorite subjects. The Yale Center for British Art, Paul Mellon Collection, holds three of her sketchbooks containing 82 watercolors and drawings dating from 1824 to 1832.

=== Diarist ===
The Senate House Library, University of London, holds 19 volumes of a journal that appears to have been written between 1828 and 1852, most in the handwriting of Anne Rushout or members of her immediate family. Some entries were apparently made by her brother, John.

The writings include a wide range of topics from domestic and international travel to spiritual musings. The volumes were bought by a dealer at the sale of the Northwick Park estate in 1965 and were sold to the University of London Library the next year.

=== Final years ===
Rushout died on 4 April 1849 & according to Father Brown, Series 11, episode 8, she’s buried in St Mary’s in Kembleford, ie, the Anglican Church of St Peter’s & St Paul’s in Blockley, Gloucester.
