= George Gray (footballer, born 1896) =

English footballer

Personal information
- Full name: George Willie Gray
- Date of birth: 27 February 1896
- Place of birth: Ecclesfield, England
- Date of death: 1962 (aged 65–66)
- Position: Full back

Senior career*
Years	Team	Apps	(Gls)
1918–1919	Eastwood Bible Class		
1919–1920	Grimsby Town	0	(0)
1920–1922	Norwich City	50	(0)
1922–1923	The Wednesday	32	(0)
Total		82	(0)
- * Club domestic league appearances and goals

George Willie Gray (27 February 1896 – 1962) was an English footballer who played in the Football League for Norwich City and The Wednesday.
