= Institute of Medical Illustrators =

IMI
- Institute of Medical Illustrators
- Founded: 1968
- Headquarters: London
- Location: United Kingdom
- Website: www.imi.org.uk

The Institute of Medical Illustrators (IMI) was established in 1968 in the UK, to set and maintain standards for the medical illustration profession. It is notable for introducing the first Diploma in Medical Illustration in the United Kingdom.

== Overview ==
Medical illustrators work in the field of healthcare science and create resources for patient care, education and teaching. IMI brings together the disciplines of clinical photography, medical art, illustration, graphic design and video within healthcare, both in the UK and internationally.

The Institute of Medical Illustrators offers professional accreditation for those with a relevant qualification in clinical photography, medical illustration, photography, graphic design or illustration.

IMI members can also join the register for the Accreditation of Medical Illustration Practitioners (CAMIP), essential for those working in close contact with patients.
