= Ted Batchelor =

English footballer

Personal information
- Full name: Edward Batchelor
- Date of birth: 4 August 1930
- Place of birth: Rugby, Warwickshire, England
- Date of death: 19 November 2006 (aged 76)
- Place of death: Swindon, Wiltshire, England
- Positions: Wing half; centre half

Senior career*
Years	Team	Apps	(Gls)
1947–1950	Wolverhampton Wanderers	0	(0)
1950–1955	Swindon Town	91	(0)
–	Bath City		
- * Club domestic league appearances and goals

Edward Batchelor (4 August 1930 – 19 November 2006) was an English footballer who played in the Football League as a wing half or centre half for Swindon Town. He began his career with Wolverhampton Wanderers, but never played for them in the league, and after leaving Swindon, went on to make 48 appearances for Southern League club Bath City. He retired from the game in 1960, and together with wife Jean, ran a newsagents in Swindon.
