= John Bewick (engraver) =

English engraver

- Born: March 1760; Cherryburn, Northumberland
- Died: 5 December 1795 (aged 35)
- Occupation: Engraver

John Bewick (March 1760 – 5 December 1795) was an English wood engraver.

== Biography ==
Bewick was the younger brother of Thomas Bewick. He was born at Cherryburn, in Mickley, Northumberland in March 1760. In 1777 he was apprenticed to Bewick and Beilby. It has been asserted that, during the time of his apprenticeship, he assisted his brother in the illustrations to 'Gay's Fables,' 1779, and the 'Select Fables,' 1784. In Bewick's 'Memoir,' however, where some acknowledgment to this effect might reasonably have been expected, there is not a word upon the subject. As a matter of fact, it is difficult to understand what material aid the younger brother could have rendered to the elder in the 'Gay's Fables,' seeing that he was only in the second year of his apprenticeship when it was first published. To the 'Select Fables' of 1784 the argument of inexperience does not equally apply; but it may be noted that John Bewick's work, for many years subsequent to 1784, will not either in draughtsmanship or engraving sustain a comparison with the illustrations in that volume. Moreover, though this is of minor importance, for at least two years previous to its appearance John Bewick had been resident in London.

According to the 'Memoir of Thomas Bewick,' John continued in his apprenticeship for about five years, when his brother gave him his liberty, and he left Newcastle for London. Here he found immediate and active, though not lucrative employment, chiefly on blocks for children's books. Hugo's Catalogue gives us the titles of some of these: The 'Children's Miscellany,' by Day of Sandford and Merton fame; the 'Honours of the Table, or Rules for Behaviour during Meals;' the 'History of a School-Boy;' and the 'New Robinson Crusoe.' The date of the last named is 1788, and many of its cuts are signed. But the first work of real importance attributed to Bewick is an edition of 'Gay's Fables,' printed in the same year for J. Buckland and others, in which, with minor variations and some exceptions, the earlier designs of Thomas Bewick are followed. This book affords an opportunity of comparing the brothers on similar grounds, and the superiority of the elder is incontestable. Next to Gay comes a book which has usually been placed first, the 'Emblems of Mortality,' published by T. Hodgson in 1789. This is a copy of the famous 'Icones,' or 'Imagines Mortis,' of Holbein, from the Latin edition issued at Lyons in 1647 by Jean Frellon 'Soubz l'escu de Cologne.' Hugo associates Thomas Bewick with John in this work; and we have certainly seen an edition which has both names on the title-page. The early writers, however, assign it to John Bewick alone; and this view is confirmed by the following extract from a letter of Thomas to John, printed in the 'Transactions of the Natural History Society of Northumberland,' &c., for 1877. 'I am much pleased, says Thomas Bewick,' with the Cuts for Death's Dance. ... I am surprised that you would undertake to do them for 6s. each. You have been spending your time and grinding out your eyes to little purpose indeed. I would not have done them for a farthing less than double that sum. ... I am glad to find you have begun on your own bottom, and I would earnestly recommend you to establish your character by taking uncommon pains with what you do.' The quotation seems to indicate that John Bewick had set up on his own account in November 1787, the date of the letter to which the above is an answer. It gives some idea besides of the prices paid for wood-engraving both in London and Newcastle, which, as may be seen, were on anything but a liberal scale.

Even in the days of Amand-Durand facsimiles the 'Emblems of Mortality' was a memento of those woodcuts which the obscure Hans Lutzelburger engraved after Holbein's designs. In details, John Bewick's copies vary considerably from the originals; and in one instance, that of the 'Creation,' where the earlier illustrator has represented the first person of the Trinity in a papal tiara, his imitator, by editorial desire, has substituted a design of his own. But the spirit of the old cuts is almost always preserved its general fidelity to Holbein is remarkable. After 'Death's Dance' came a little group of books, chiefly intended for the education of children. Of these it is impossible to give any detailed or exhaustive account, nor is it needful, as they have all a strong family resemblance. The first two, 'Proverbs Exemplified,' 1790, and the 'Progress of Man and Society;' 1791, were by Hogarth's commentator, Dr. Trusler. The former is sufficiently explained by its title; the latter is a kind of modern version of the old Latin and High Dutch 'Orbis Pictos' of Comenius published at Amsterdam in 1667. Both of these books are undoubtedly illustrated by John Bewick alone whose name is given in the 'Preface' to the 'Proverbs.' Besides these there are the 'Looking Glass for the Mind,' 1792, the charming 'Tales for Youth,' 1794, and the 'Blossoms of Morality,' 1796.

The appearance of the 'Blossoms of Morality' was for some time delayed in consequence of the illness of the artist, and long (before it was published John Bewick was sleeping in Oyingham churchyard. His health had been seriously impaired by the close confinement of the metropolis; and though a visit to Cherryburn seems to have partially restored him, be was finally obliged to return to his native air in the summer of 1796, and shortly afterwards died of consumption. In the year of his death was published a sumptuous edition of the 'Poems of Goldsmith and Parnell' due to the enterprise of that William Bulmer, of the ' Shakepeare Printing Office,' whom his contemporaries fondly likened to the Aldi and Elsevirs of old, and the preface proudly sets forth the luxuries of its type, its printing, its Whatman paper, and its embellishments. To this book John Bewick contributed one cut, drawn and engraved by him in illustration of the well-known passage in the 'Deserted Village' respecting the old watercress gatherer. He is also understood to have designed two of the vignettes and one of the tail-pieces. During the last months of his life he was also engaged in making sketches on the block for the Fabliaux of Le Grand, translated by Way, 1790; and for an edition of Somervile's 'Chase' issued by Bulmer in the same year. These were chiefly engraved by Thomas Bewick, who also, he says (Memoir, p. 108), completed the drawings for the 'Chase' after his brother's death.

As is generally the case with those who die young, it is somewhat difficult to speak of John Bewick's merits as an artist and engraver. Much of his work bears evident signs of haste, as well as of an invention which was far in advance of his powers of execution. He had evidently a keen eye for character, and considerable skill in catching strongly marked expression. Many of the little groups in the 'Proverbs exemplified' might be elaborated into striking studies. His animals, too, are admirable — witness the popular prowling cat in 'Tales for Youth,' the hunting scenes in the 'Chase,' and many of the vignettes in the children's books, though a large portion of these last are obvious adaptations of his brother's work. But he seems to have had one quality not possessed by Thomas Bewick, a certain gift of grace, especially in his pictures of children. Whether he caught this from the novel illustration of the period is matter for speculation; but examples of it might easily be pointed out in the 'Looking Glass,' the 'Progress of Man,' and elsewhere. As an engraver he falls far below his brother. His style is flatter, more conventional, less happy in black and white. But he improved greatly in his latest work.

Only one portrait of John Bewick is known to exist— a crayon by George Gray in the Newcastle Museum. Personally he seems to have been witty, vivacious, and very popular with his associates, an advantage, in the eyes of his graver brother, not without its perils. At the time of his death (5 December 1795) he was curving the view of Cherryburn afterwards issued as a frontispiece to the 'Memoir' of 1862. He left it uncompleted, and it was eventually finished by Thomas Bewick. The original sketch, probably made much earlier, is carefully preserved, with, some water-colours and other relics, by his grand-nieces, who still (1884) speak affectionately of the talents and amiability of their 'uncle John.'
