= Mount Auburn Presbyterian Church =

Coordinates: 39°07′40″N 84°30′28″W

Mount Auburn Presbyterian Church is a congregation of the Presbyterian Church (USA) located in Cincinnati, Ohio.

== History ==
The conception of Mount Auburn Presbyterian Church can be traced to a meeting December 19, 1866 of the Sessions of five "Old School" Presbyterian churches in Cincinnati which resolved to appoint a committee to form a new church located in the then-suburb of Mount Auburn. The resulting four-man committee called public meetings on March 14 and March 28, 1867 to raise $25,000 that was estimated to suffice for lot and building. The lot was bought June 1 that year and legal incorporation began on July 23, 1867. Construction of the first building designed by architect J.W. McLaughlin proceeded while the first prayer meeting was held November 25, 1868. Costs exceeding original estimates spurred church leaders to solicit additional subscriptions from donors to cover the final cost of $32,000. The building, later known as the "Old Wooden" Church, was completed and dedicated, free of debt, on January 31, 1869.

By 1870, the schism between Old School and New School ended in the Reunion assembly of the Presbyterian Church. In the reunited denomination, Mount Auburn Presbyterian stood in the Cincinnati Presbytery that was in turn part of the Synod of Cincinnati.

On October 10, 1888, the wooden church was mostly destroyed by fire—although due to rapid response by the wife of the pastor, along with the rector of a nearby church, saved the organ and other property from damage. The congregation decided to build out of stone in the location of the burned wooden church, and the cornerstone of what is the current building was laid June 24, 1889. On March 2, 1890 the first service was held in the new building.

In 1957, the education building was completed, to the east of the main church building and the intervening office building (formerly the manse). The final piece of the current building complex, the Connector Building that conjoined the stone building to the office building (and thence the education building), was dedicated on December 6, 1987. This construction finally brought full accessibility for disabled persons.

During the 1980s and 90s, Mt. Auburn moved against existing orthodoxy towards broader inclusion in worship and communion. The church—under Rev. Harold Porter who was installed in 1983—adopted a policy of open communion called "A Table Set for All". The Session in 1989 asked through the Presbytery of Cincinnati to amend the PCUSA constitution to adopt open communion in place of existing rules that welcomed only baptized believers, which move the Presbytery narrowly defeated. Mt. Auburn persisted in welcoming all to communion nevertheless. Mount Auburn Presbyterian Church further adopted a policy called "The Inclusion of Gays and Lesbians" in 1991—despite formal ruling by the denomination in 1978 prohibiting gays and lesbians from leadership.

== Controversy ==
Mount Auburn Presbyterian Church has weathered several ecclesiastical controversies in its century and a half. The first notable case was in late 1892 when the Rev. Henry Preserved Smith was tried for heresy. Smith was a member of the church, a professor at Lane Seminary, and previous Moderator of the Cincinnati Presbytery in 1890. The Presbytery took objection to his pamphlet "Biblical Scholarship and Inspiration" and related publications and statements he made regarding Biblical authority. He was found guilty, despite having outspoken support by then pastor of Mount Auburn Presbyterian Dr. Henry M. Curtis—along with much of the congregation. In latter years, the church has gained prominence because of its role in the controversies over gay marriage and the ordination of gay elders within the Presbyterian Church. While serving as minister of the church, the Reverend Stephen van Kuiken carried out the church's policy of performing gay marriages for three years, before being kicked out of the Presbyterian Church by a vote of the Cincinnati Presbytery in 2003. Mt. Auburn fired Van Kuiken and changed its policy on gay marriage. Van Kuiken later appealed the ruling of the presbytery and was reinstated as a minister of the Presbyterian Church.
