= George Gray (painter) =

English painter

- Born: 1758; Newcastle-on-Tyne
- Died: 9 December 1819 (aged 60–61)
- Occupation: Painter

George Gray (1758 – 9 December 1819) was an English painter.

== Biography ==
Gray was born at Newcastle-on-Tyne in 1758, was son of Gilbert Gray, a well-known quaker of that town. He was educated at the grammar school, and was first apprenticed to a fruit-painter named Jones, with whom he resided some time at York. Besides painting, Gray studied chemistry, mineralogy, and botany. In 1787 he went to North America on a botanical excursion, and in 1791 he was sent on an expedition to report on the geology of Poland. In 1794, Gray settled in Newcastle as a portrait, fruit, or sign painter, and was employed as a drawing-master. He also occupied himself with numerous ingenious inventions, such as making bread from roots and weaving stockings from nettles. Gray's humour and originality made him popular. Late in life he married the widow of a schoolmaster, Mrs. Dobie, whom he survived. He died at his house in Pudding Chare, Newcastle, on 9 December 1819. A crayon portrait of John Bewick, by Gray, is in the museum of the Natural History Society at Newcastle.
