= George Wilkie Gray =

Member of the Queensland Legislative Council (1844–1924)

The Hon George Gray
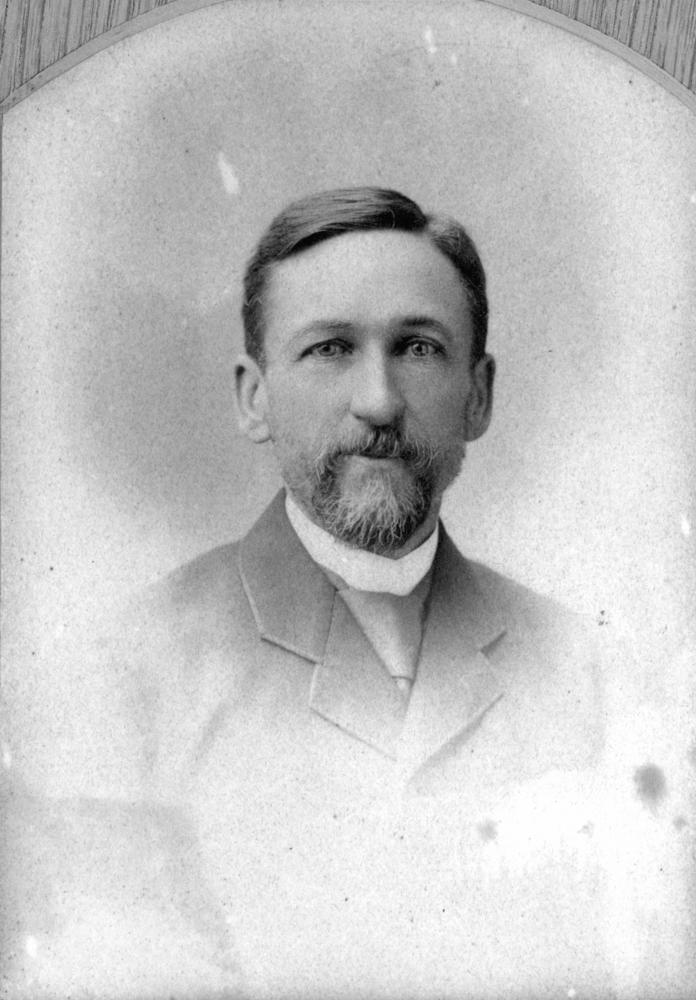

Member of the Queensland Legislative Council
- In office 23 August 1894 – 23 March 1922

Personal details
- Born: George Wilkie Gray; 3 August 1844 Sydney, Australia
- Died: 22 September 1924 (aged 80) Brisbane, Queensland, Australia
- Resting place: Nudgee Cemetery
- Spouse(s): Maria Emma Boulderson (m.1871 d.1916), Lilian Eleanor MacDonnell, née Perkins (m.1919 d.1957)
- Relations: Patrick Perkins (father-in-law), Charles Mein
- Occupation: Brewer, company director

George Wilkie Gray (3 August 1844 – 22 September 1924) was a businessman, and member of the Queensland Legislative Council.

== Early life ==
Gray was born in Sydney to Alexander Gray, a licensed victualler, and his wife Margaret (née Hall). He left school early but studied accountancy at night and in 1863 moved to Queensland where he found work with Clarke, Hodgson & Co, first as a clerk in Ipswich and then as a manager in Brisbane.

Around 1870, Gray became friends with Michael Quinlan, a mercantile shipping agent, and joined Quinlan Donnelly & Co. After Quinlan died in 1878, his widow made Gray a managing partner in the now renamed Quinlan Gray & Co.

In 1887, Gray amalgamated his company with E. and N. Fitzgerald to form a public company, the Castlemaine Brewery and established its premises in Milton with Gray being managing director in 1924. Gray had many other business interests, he was director of National Mutual Life Association of Australasia Ltd (Queensland), Queensland National Bank, Millaquin Sugar Co, Queensland Insurance Co. Ltd, and Queensland Trustees Ltd.

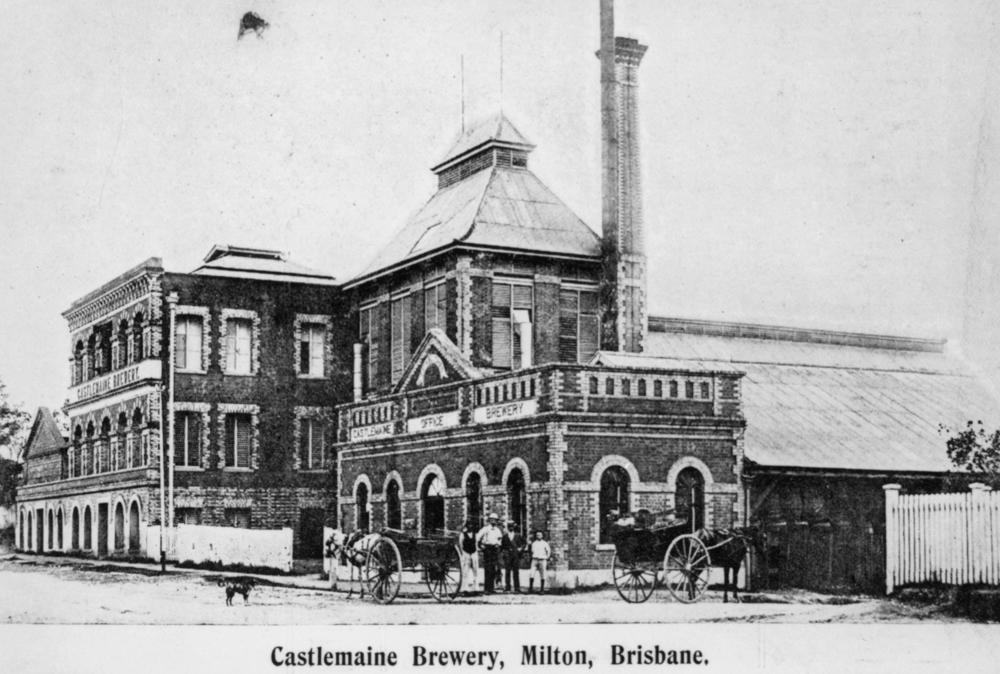
Side view of the Castlemaine Brewery in 1901

== Political career ==
Appointed to the Queensland Legislative Council in August 1894, Gray held his seat till the council was abolished in March 1922. Except for a one-week break in 1899, he was the Minister without Office and Representative of Government in Legislative Council, from October 1898 till September 1903.

== Personal life ==
Gray was married twice, firstly to Maria Emma Boulderson from 1871 till her death in 1916. Their marriage produced four children. He then married Lilian Eleanor MacDonnell née Perkins (died 1957), the daughter of Patrick Perkins in 1919.

Gray died in 1924. His funeral proceeded from St. Cecelia's Catholic Church in Hamilton to the Nudgee Cemetery. In his will he assigned his life insurance policies to the Sisters of Mercy, which was used to build the Mater Children's Hospital.
