= Campus cooperative =

Cooperative enterprise affiliated with a university or college

A campus cooperative (also university cooperative or student cooperative) is a cooperative enterprise that operates within or in affiliation with a university or college, owned and democratically governed by its members, who are typically students, faculty, and staff. Campus cooperatives can take various forms, including consumer cooperatives (bookstores, food stores), housing cooperatives, credit unions, worker cooperatives, and multipurpose service cooperatives.

The campus cooperative movement spans over a century, from the founding of the Harvard Cooperative Society in 1882 to present-day initiatives across Asia, Europe, the Americas, and Africa. Japan's National Federation of University Co-operative Associations (NFUCA) represents the world's largest system of university cooperatives, with over 200 member cooperatives serving 1.5 million members.

== History ==
=== Origins (1880s–1910s) ===
The earliest campus cooperatives were bookstore cooperatives founded in the United States:

- The Harvard Cooperative Society was founded in 1882 by students who felt merchants in Harvard Square were overcharging for books, firewood, and other necessities. It opened in a dormitory room with a $1.00 membership fee and sold products at 5% above cost, making it the oldest collegiate cooperative in the United States.
- The University Co-operative Society was established in 1896 at the University of Texas at Austin by Professor William J. Battle, modelled on the Harvard Co-op.
- The Ontario Agricultural College Students' Co-operative Association (now Guelph Campus Co-op) was founded on 26 November 1913, making it the oldest continuously operating student cooperative in Canada.

=== Great Depression era (1930s) ===
The Great Depression catalysed growth in student cooperatives, primarily for affordable food and housing:

- In 1932, the Michigan Socialist House became the first cooperative house at the University of Michigan.
- In 1933, 14 students at the University of California, Berkeley founded the University of California Students' Cooperative Association (now the Berkeley Student Cooperative), leasing a fraternity house to create Barrington Hall for 48 students. It has since grown to house over 1,300 students in 20 properties, making it one of the largest student housing cooperatives in the United States.
- In 1936, Campus Co-operative Residence Inc. was established in Toronto, becoming Canada's oldest student housing cooperative.

In 1937, several University of Michigan cooperatives coordinated to form the Inter-Cooperative Council (later the Inter-Cooperative Council). A 1941 Bureau of Labor Statistics survey found 124 cooperative houses with 7,642 members across 116 associations in the United States.

=== Post-war institutionalisation (1940s–1960s) ===
- In 1946, the North American Student Cooperative League (NASCL) was founded with the support of the Cooperative League of the USA.
- In 1947, Japan's university cooperative movement began its post-war reorganisation, leading to the formal establishment of NFUCA in 1958 with cooperatives from 35 universities.
- In 1964, Waterloo Co-operative Residence Inc. (WCRI) was founded in Ontario, Canada, by engineering student Richard Rowe. Its Dag Hammarskjöld Residence was the first student-built, -owned, and -operated dormitory in North America. WCRI has since grown to over 1,300 residents, becoming the largest student cooperative in North America.

=== Counterculture era (1960s–1970s) ===
Student cooperatives surged during the period of campus activism:

- In 1968, North American Students of Cooperation (NASCO) was founded at a conference in Chicago, creating a continent-wide federation for student cooperatives.
- In 1970, Neill-Wycik Co-operative College Inc. opened in Toronto with an 800-student, 22-storey building near Ryerson Polytechnical Institute.
- In 1975, the Maryland Food Collective was founded at the University of Maryland as a worker cooperative food store, later recognised by the Smithsonian Institution's National Museum of American History. It closed in 2019 after 44 years of operation.

=== Contemporary developments (2000s–present) ===
- In 2009–2010, BÜKOOP (Boğaziçi Mensupları Tüketim Kooperatifi) was established at Boğaziçi University in Istanbul, Turkey, as a volunteer-run consumer food cooperative connecting small-scale producers with university members.
- In 2010, the Berkeley Student Food Collective opened at UC Berkeley and inspired the creation of CoFED (Cooperative Food Empowerment Directive), which supports campus food cooperatives nationally.
- In 2014, the Edinburgh Student Housing Co-operative opened as the largest student housing cooperative in the United Kingdom, with 106 members.
- In 2020, OSCOOP was established at OSTİM Technical University in Ankara, Turkey, as the first legally registered student cooperative on a Turkish campus.

== Types ==
=== Bookstore and consumer cooperatives ===
The oldest type of campus cooperative, bookstore cooperatives sell textbooks, supplies, and other goods at or near cost. Examples include the Harvard Cooperative Society (1882), the University Co-operative Society at UT Austin (1896), and the Guelph Campus Co-op (1913).

=== Housing cooperatives ===
Student housing cooperatives are the most numerous type of campus cooperative, particularly in North America and the United Kingdom. Members typically pay significantly below-market rent — often up to 50% less than comparable housing — in exchange for contributing weekly work shifts (cooking, cleaning, maintenance, governance). They are generally organised as "group equity" cooperatives, in which members own shares in the cooperative rather than individual units.

Notable examples include the Berkeley Student Cooperative (1,300+ members), WCRI in Waterloo (1,300+ residents), and the Edinburgh Student Housing Co-operative (106 members).

=== Food cooperatives ===
Campus food cooperatives range from small buying clubs to full retail stores. They typically prioritise organic, local, and fair-trade products, often sold at or near cost. Examples include BÜKOOP at Boğaziçi University, which sources directly from small-scale agricultural cooperatives across Turkey, the Binghamton University Food Co-Op (founded 1975, still operating),

=== Credit unions ===
Several campus-based credit unions serve university communities. The Georgetown University Alumni & Student Federal Credit Union, chartered in 1983, is the largest entirely student-run credit union in the United States.

=== Worker cooperatives and student enterprises ===
Some campus cooperatives are organised as worker cooperatives, in which student-workers collectively own and manage the enterprise. OSCOOP at OSTİM Technical University in Turkey (2020) provides consultancy and web development services, while the Lonca Translation Cooperative at Marmara University (2021) offers translation and localisation services.

=== Cooperative universities ===
Some universities are themselves organised as cooperatives. Mondragon University in the Basque Country, Spain, founded in 1997 as part of the Mondragon Corporation, is governed by a General Assembly with equal representation of staff, students, and external stakeholders. The Co-operative University of Kenya (established 1967, university charter 2016) specialises in cooperative management and education.

== By country ==
=== Japan ===
Japan has the world's most extensive system of university cooperatives. The National Federation of University Co-operative Associations (NFUCA), established in 1958, comprises over 200 member cooperatives with more than 1.5 million individual members — approximately 40% of all Japanese university students. Japanese university cooperatives are comprehensive, typically operating bookstores, cafeterias, convenience stores, travel agencies, housing bureaus, and mutual aid insurance programmes on a single campus. NFUCA reports an aggregate annual turnover of approximately 130.8 billion yen (c. US$870 million).

=== South Korea ===
The Korea Federation of University Cooperatives (KFUC), established in 2011, comprises 34 member cooperatives with approximately 144,000 individual members. South Korea's first university cooperative was established in 1989. The 2012 Framework Act on Co-operatives enabled the growth of social cooperatives, including campus-based initiatives.

=== Indonesia ===
Koperasi Mahasiswa (student cooperatives) are a well-established institution at Indonesian universities. Notable examples include Kopma Bumi Siliwangi at Universitas Pendidikan Indonesia (1975) and Kopma UGM at Gadjah Mada University (1982). They typically function as multipurpose cooperatives operating supermarkets, postal services, and other student services.

=== Turkey ===
Turkey's campus cooperative movement is anchored by BÜKOOP (est. 2009–2010) at Boğaziçi University, a volunteer-run consumer food cooperative that sources products from approximately 20 agricultural cooperatives and small producers across Turkey. BÜKOOP operates on a cost-plus model with a 13–16% margin, uses a Participatory Guarantee System instead of organic certification, and has inspired neighbourhood cooperatives in Istanbul including the Kadıköy, Beşiktaş, Yerdeniz, and Yeryüzü cooperatives.

OSCOOP at OSTİM Technical University (est. 2020) was the first legally registered student cooperative on a Turkish campus, while the Lonca Translation Cooperative at Marmara University (est. 2021) is a worker cooperative for translation services. Genç İşi Kooperatif (Youth Deal Cooperative, est. 2015, İzmir) functions as a social cooperative incubating youth cooperative initiatives nationally.

Turkish campus cooperatives face distinctive legal challenges under Law 1163 (1969), including the absence of a dedicated "student cooperative" legal designation, high board member liability that deters student participation, and bans on commercial activity in state dormitories. The Turkish government's 2025–2029 National Cooperative Strategy includes "Campus Cooperativism" (Turkish: Kampüs Kooperatifçiliği) as a priority, implemented in partnership with the Council of Higher Education (YÖK).

=== United Kingdom ===
Students for Cooperation is a secondary cooperative federating over 30 student cooperatives across Britain, including 24 food co-ops, 4 housing co-ops, and other types. The Edinburgh Student Housing Co-operative (2014, 106 members) is the largest student housing cooperative in the UK. In 2019, the Co-operative Group signed a partnership with the National Union of Students to operate stores in student unions.

=== Other countries ===
- Canada: Home to several large student cooperatives, including WCRI (Waterloo, 1,300+ residents), Neill-Wycik (Toronto, 800 students), and the Guelph Campus Co-op (1913, oldest continuing student co-op in Canada).
- Germany: The Studentenwerk system (founded 1921) provides student services through 57 state-run non-profit organisations. The Collegium Academicum in Heidelberg (opened 2023) is a purpose-built student housing cooperative for 250 residents.
- Spain: Mondragon University (1997) and Florida Universitària in Valencia operate as cooperative universities.
- Colombia: The Cooperative University of Colombia (Universidad Cooperativa de Colombia), established as an institution in 1958 and receiving university status in 1983, is present in 17 cities.

== Umbrella organisations ==
Organisation	Region	Founded	Scope
North American Students of Cooperation (NASCO)	North America	1968	~40 member cooperatives, 4,000+ cooperators; hosts annual NASCO Institute; operates NASCO Development Services and NASCO Properties
National Federation of University Co-operative Associations (NFUCA)	Japan	1958	200+ member co-ops, 1.5M+ members; ICA member since 2001
Korea Federation of University Cooperatives (KFUC)	South Korea	2011	34 member co-ops, ~144,000 members
Students for Cooperation (SfC)	United Kingdom	—	30+ student co-ops across Britain
CoFED	United States	2010	Supports campus food cooperative development
International Cooperative Alliance Youth Committee	Global	—	ICA youth network (up to age 35)

== Governance and principles ==
Campus cooperatives generally adhere to the Rochdale Principles as adopted by the International Cooperative Alliance:

1. Voluntary and open membership — typically any student, faculty, or staff member can join by paying a nominal fee
2. Democratic member control — one member, one vote; decisions made at general meetings or by elected boards
3. Member economic participation — members contribute equitably through fees, share capital, or work-shifts; surplus is reinvested or returned to members
4. Autonomy and independence — most campus cooperatives are legally independent of their host university, though they may lease space or have institutional agreements
5. Education, training, and information — many cooperatives provide cooperative education as a core mission
6. Cooperation among cooperatives — facilitated through federations such as NASCO, NFUCA, and Students for Cooperation
7. Concern for community — many emphasise social justice, sustainability, food sovereignty, and inclusion

== See also ==
- Cooperative
- Student housing cooperative
- Consumer cooperative
- Worker cooperative
- Credit union
- North American Students of Cooperation
- Rochdale Principles
- Food sovereignty
- BÜKOOP
- Tarlataban
- Alternative food network
