= Housing cooperative =

Type of housing development that emphasizes self-governance and quasi-communal living

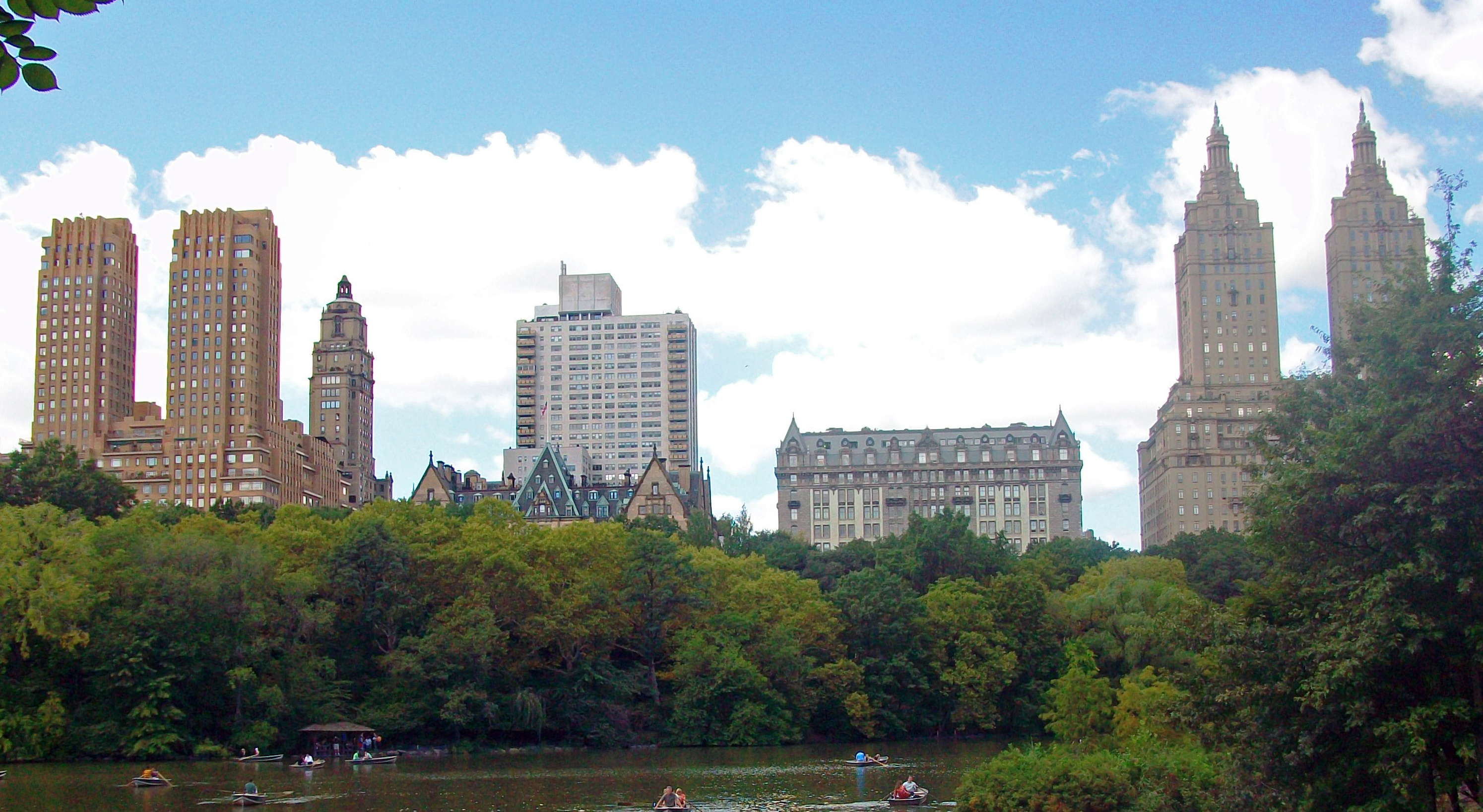
Housing cooperatives on Central Park West in Manhattan, New York City, from left to right: the Majestic, the Dakota, the Langham, and the San Remo

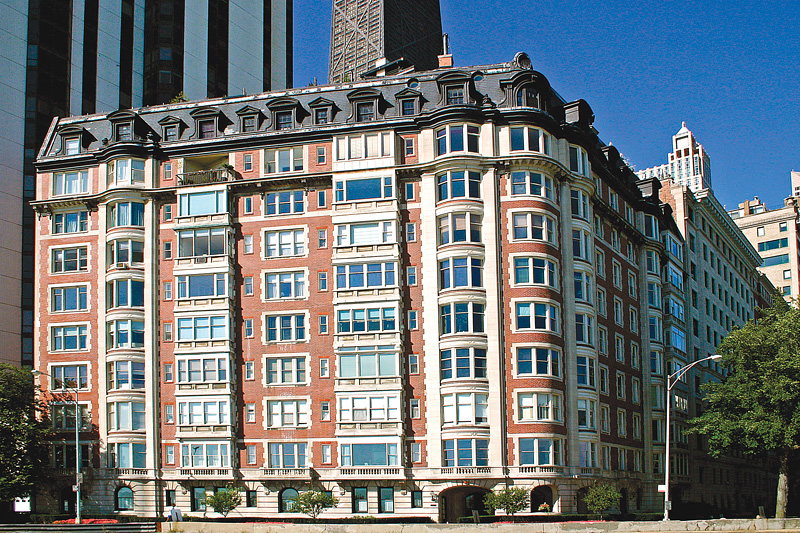
999 N. Lake Shore Drive, a co-op–owned residential building in Chicago, Illinois

A housing cooperative, or housing co-op, is a legal entity which owns real estate consisting of one or more residential buildings. The entity is usually a cooperative or a corporation and constitutes a form of housing tenure. Typically, housing cooperatives are owned by shareholders, but in some cases they can be owned by a non-profit organization. They are a distinctive form of home ownership that have many characteristics that differ from other residential arrangements such as single family home ownership, condominiums and renting.

Housing cooperatives fall into two general tenure categories: non-ownership (referred to as non-equity or continuing) and ownership (referred to as equity or strata). In non-equity cooperatives, occupancy rights are sometimes granted subject to an occupancy or membership agreement, which is similar to a lease. In equity cooperatives, occupancy rights are sometimes granted by way of purchase agreements and legal instruments registered on the title. The corporation's articles of incorporation and bylaws together with the occupancy agreement specify the cooperative's rules.

The cooperative is membership based, with membership in equity cooperatives granted by way of a share purchase in the cooperative. Each shareholder in the legal entity is granted the right to occupy one housing unit. A primary advantage of the housing cooperative is the pooling of the members' resources so that their buying power is leveraged; thus lowering the cost per member in all the services and products associated with home ownership.

Another key element in some forms of housing cooperatives is that the members, through their elected representatives or a membership committee, screen and select who may live in the cooperative, unlike any other form of home ownership.

The word cooperative is also used to describe a non-share capital co-op model in which fee-paying members obtain the right to occupy a bedroom and share the communal resources of a house owned by a cooperative organization. Such is the case with student cooperatives in some college and university communities across the United States.

== Legal status ==
As a legal entity, a co-op can contract with other companies or hire individuals to provide it with services, such as a maintenance contractor or a building manager. It can also hire employees, such as a manager or a caretaker, to deal with specific upkeep tasks at which volunteers may hesitate or may not be skilled, such as electrical maintenance.

In equity cooperatives and in limited equity cooperatives, a shareholder owns a share of the co-operative housing corporation, but does not directly own any real estate. In non-equity co-operatives, the people who live in them are members but have no equity at all, owning neither shares nor land. Co-operative ownership is quite distinct from condominiums where people own individual units and have little say in who moves into the other units. Because of this, most jurisdictions have developed separate legislation, similar to laws that regulate companies, to regulate how co-ops are operated and the rights and obligations of shareholders.

== Ownership ==
Each resident or resident household has membership in the co-operative association. In non-equity cooperatives, members have occupancy rights to a specific suite within the housing co-operative as outlined in their "occupancy agreement", or "proprietary lease", which is essentially a lease. In ownership cooperatives, occupancy rights are transferred to the purchaser by way of the title transfer.

Since the housing cooperative holds title to all the property and housing structures, it bears the cost of maintaining, repairing and replacing them. This relieves the member from the cost and burden of such work. In that sense, the housing cooperative is like the landlord in a rental setting. However, another hallmark of cooperative living is that it is nonprofit, so that the work is done at cost, with no profit motive involved.

In some cases, the co-op follows Rochdale Principles where each shareholder has only one vote. Most cooperatives are incorporated as limited stock companies where the number of votes an owner has is tied to the number of shares owned by the person. Whichever form of voting is employed it is necessary to conduct an election among shareholders to determine who will represent them on the board of directors (if one exists), the governing body of the co-operative. The board of directors is generally responsible for the business decisions including the financial requirements and sustainability of the co-operative. Although politics vary from co-op to co-op and depend largely on the wishes of its members, it is a general rule that a majority vote of the board is necessary to make business decisions.

== Management ==
In larger co-ops, members of a co-op typically elect a board of directors from amongst themselves at a general meeting, usually the annual general meeting. In smaller co-ops, all members sit on the board.

A housing cooperative's board of directors is elected by the membership, providing a voice and representation in the governance of the property. Rules are determined by the board, providing a flexible means of addressing the issues that arise in a community to assure the members' peaceful possession of their homes.

== Finance ==
A housing cooperative is normally de facto non-profit, since usually most of its income comes from the rents paid by its residents (if in a formal corporation, then shareholders), who are invariably its members. There is no point in creating a deliberate surplus—except for operational requirements such as setting aside funds for replacement of assets—since that simply means that the rents paid by members are set higher than the expenses. (It is possible for a housing co-op to own other revenue-generating assets, such as renting out space in the cooperative commercially, or a subsidiary business which could produce surplus income to offset the cost of the housing, but in those cases the revenue is used to reduce the costs of housing for the members.)

In the lifecycle of buildings, the replacement of assets (capital repairs) requires significant funds which can be obtained through a variety of ways: assessments on current owners; sales of Treasury Stock (former rental units) to new shareholders; draw downs of reserves; unsecured loans; operating surpluses; fees on the sales of units by shareholders; and increases to existing mortgages.

Housing cooperatives include buildings such as The Dakota. In New York City, a portion of owner-occupied apartments are held through cooperative arrangements rather than condominiums.

=== Market-rate and limited-equity co-ops ===
There are two main types of housing co-operative share pricing: market rate and limited equity. With market rate, the share price is allowed to rise on the open market and shareholders may sell at whatever price the market will bear when they want to move out. In many ways market rate is thus similar financially to owning a condominium, with the difference being that often the co-op may carry a mortgage, resulting in a much higher monthly fee paid to the co-op than would be so in a condominium. The purchase price of a comparable unit in the co-op is typically much lower, however.

With limited equity, the co-op has rules regarding pricing of shares when sold. The idea behind limited equity is to maintain affordable housing. A sub-set of the limited equity model is the no-equity model, which looks very much like renting, with a very low purchase price (comparable to a rental security deposit) and a monthly fee in lieu of rent. When selling, all that is recouped is that very low purchase price.

== Research on housing cooperatives ==
Research in Canada found that housing cooperatives had residents rate themselves as having the highest quality of life and housing satisfaction of any housing organization in the city. Other research among older residents from the rural United States found that those living in housing cooperatives felt much safer, independent, satisfied with life, had more friends, had more privacy, were healthier and had things repaired faster. Australian researchers found that cooperative housing built stronger social networks and support, as well as better relationships with neighbours compared to other forms of housing. They cost 14% less for residents and had lower rates of debt and vacancy. Other US research has found that housing cooperatives tended to have higher rates of building quality, building safety, feelings of security among residents, lower crime rates, stable access to housing and significantly lower costs compared to conventional housing.

== By country ==
=== Australia ===
Housing co-operatives in Australia are primarily non-equity rental co-operatives, but there are some equity co-operatives as well. The rental co-operatives are generally a part of the Australian social housing/community housing sector and have been funded by various iterations of government funding programs.

One of the largest co-operative housing organisations in Australia is Common Equity Housing Ltd (CEHL) in the state of Victoria. CEHL is a registered housing association with its shares held by its 103-member co-operatives. As of 2023 CEHL co-operatives house 4,291 people in 2,101 homes.

Common Equity, in the state of NSW, is also a registered housing provider and manages 500 properties in 31 member housing co-operatives.

=== Canada ===
Non-equity co-ops in Canada offer an affordable alternative to renting, but waiting lists for the units can be years long. According to the Co-operative Housing Association of Canada, there are approximately 92,000 co-op housing units across the country, many built with the help of government-backed programs in the 1970s and 1980s. These housing co-ops were estimated in 2018 to represent about 0.7% of the nation's housing stock. Equity cooperatives are rarer, and financing the purchase of a unit in an equity cooperative is more difficult than financing a condominium purchase, with fewer lenders willing to advance funds.

=== France ===
In 2013, the opening of La Maison des Babayagas, an innovative housing co-op in Paris, gained worldwide attention. It was formed as a self-help community and built with financial assistance from the municipal government, specifically for female senior citizens. Located in the Paris suburb of Montreuil after many years of planning, it looks like any other apartment building. The senior citizens stay out of nursing homes, by staying active, alert, and assisting one another.

The purpose of the Baba Yaga Association is to create and develop an innovative lay residence for aging women that is: (1) self-managed, without hierarchy and without supervision; (2) united collective, with regard to finances as well as daily life; (3) citizen civic-minded, through openness to the community /city and through mutual interaction, engaging in its political, cultural and social life in a spirit of participatory democracy; (4) ecological in all aspects of life, in conformity with the values and actions expressed in the Charter of Living of the House of Babayagas.

Generally, the association's activities are tied to the purpose above, in particular, the development of a popular entity called the University of Knowledge of the Elderly (UNISAVIE: Université du savoir des vieux), and the initiation of a movement to promote other living places that are organized into similar networks.

The community charter sets out expectations for privacy. Each apartment is self-contained. Monthly meetings assure the optimal routines of the building and ensure that each person may participate fully and with complete liberty of expression. Plans set out the routine intervention of a mediator who could help get to the bottom of the causes of eventual conflicts in order to allow for their resolution.

The success of the Paris co-op inspired several Canadian grassroots groups to adopt similar values in senior housing initiatives; these values include autonomy and self-management, solidarity and mutual aid, civic engagement, and ecological responsibility.

=== Germany ===
Housing cooperatives, or "Wohnungsgenossenschaften" in German, are a type of housing association that provides affordable housing to its members. They are formed and run by a group of people who come together to pool their resources in order to purchase or build housing for their own use.

In Germany, housing cooperatives are typically organized as non-profit organizations, which means that any profits made from the sale or rental of the housing are reinvested in the cooperative rather than being distributed to shareholders. This allows housing cooperatives to offer lower prices for housing than would be possible for for-profit organizations. Members of a housing cooperative typically have the right to occupy a specific unit within the cooperative's housing complex, and they also have a say in the management and decision-making of the cooperative. This can include voting on issues related to the maintenance and operation of the housing complex, as well as electing a board of directors to oversee the cooperative's operations.

Housing cooperatives are a popular form of housing in Germany, particularly in urban areas, and they are often seen as a way to provide affordable, community-oriented housing options.

During industrialisation in the 19th century, there were many housing cooperatives founded in Germany. Presently, there are over 2,000 housing cooperatives with over two million apartments and over three million members in Germany. The public housing cooperatives are organised in the GdW Bundesverband deutscher Wohnungs- und Immobilienunternehmen (Federal association of German housing and real estate enterprise registered associations).

=== Egypt ===
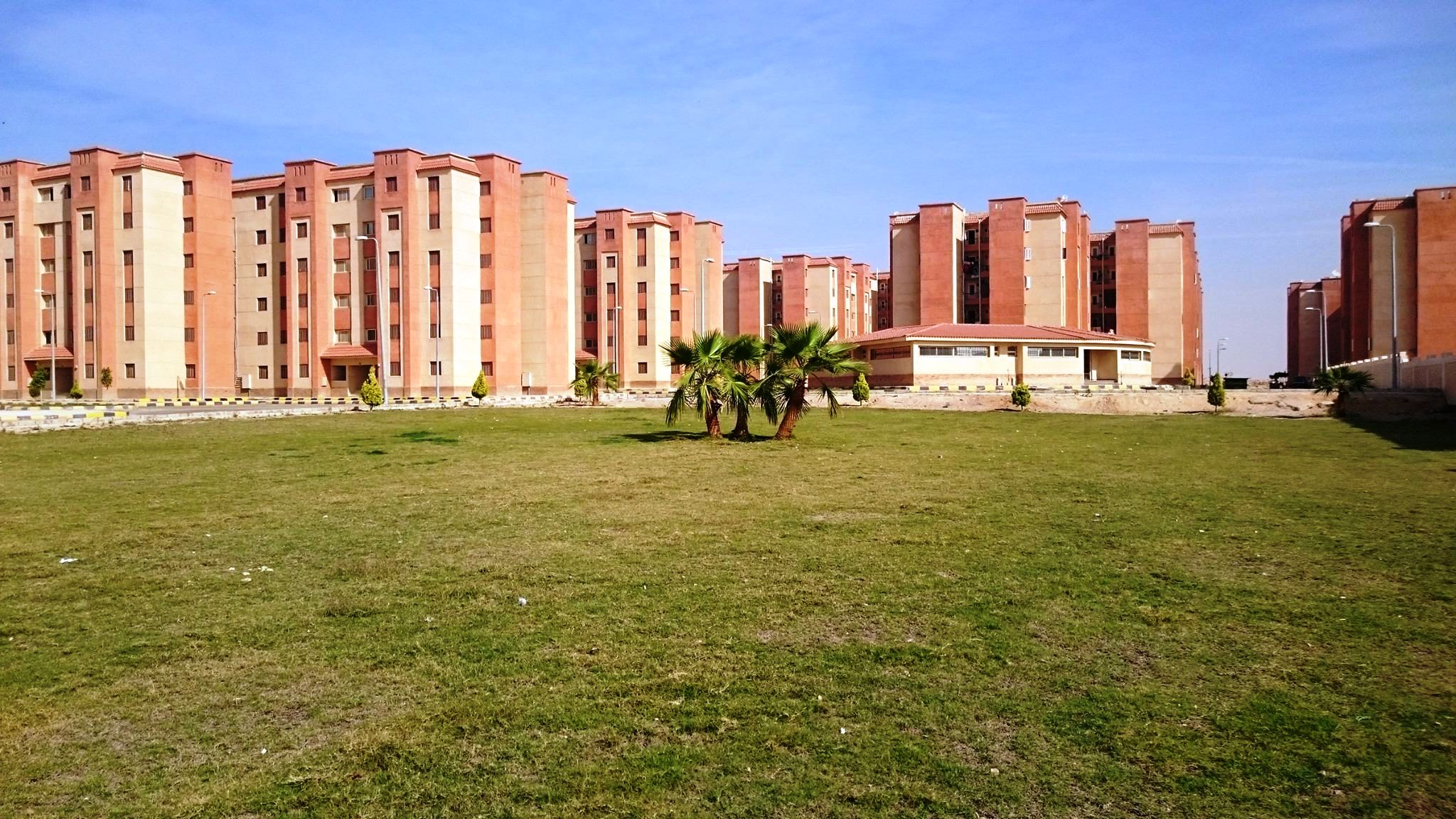
Housing cooperative in New Borg El Arab city, Egypt

Housing cooperative projects in Egypt aim to serve the low-income class, as they provides them with housing units consisting of two rooms, a hall or three rooms and a fully finished hall, with an area ranging from 75 to 90 square meters. In addition, these units are offered at a cost price only, with direct support ranging from 5 to 25 thousand pounds. The beneficiary of this unit can pay its price over a period of 20 years, as 538,000 units have been implemented in all governorates and new cities until 2022, implemented by Ministry of Housing, Utilities & Urban Communities.

=== India ===
In India, most 'flats' are owned outright. i.e. the title to each individual flat is separate. There is usually a governing body/society/association to administer maintenance and other building needs. These are comparable to the Condominium Buildings in the USA. The laws governing the building, its governing body and how flats within the building are transferred differ from state to state.

Certain buildings are organized as "Cooperative Housing Societies" where one actually owns a share in the Cooperative rather than the flat itself. This structure was very popular in the past but has become less common in recent times. Most states have separate laws governing Cooperative Housing Societies.

=== Netherlands ===
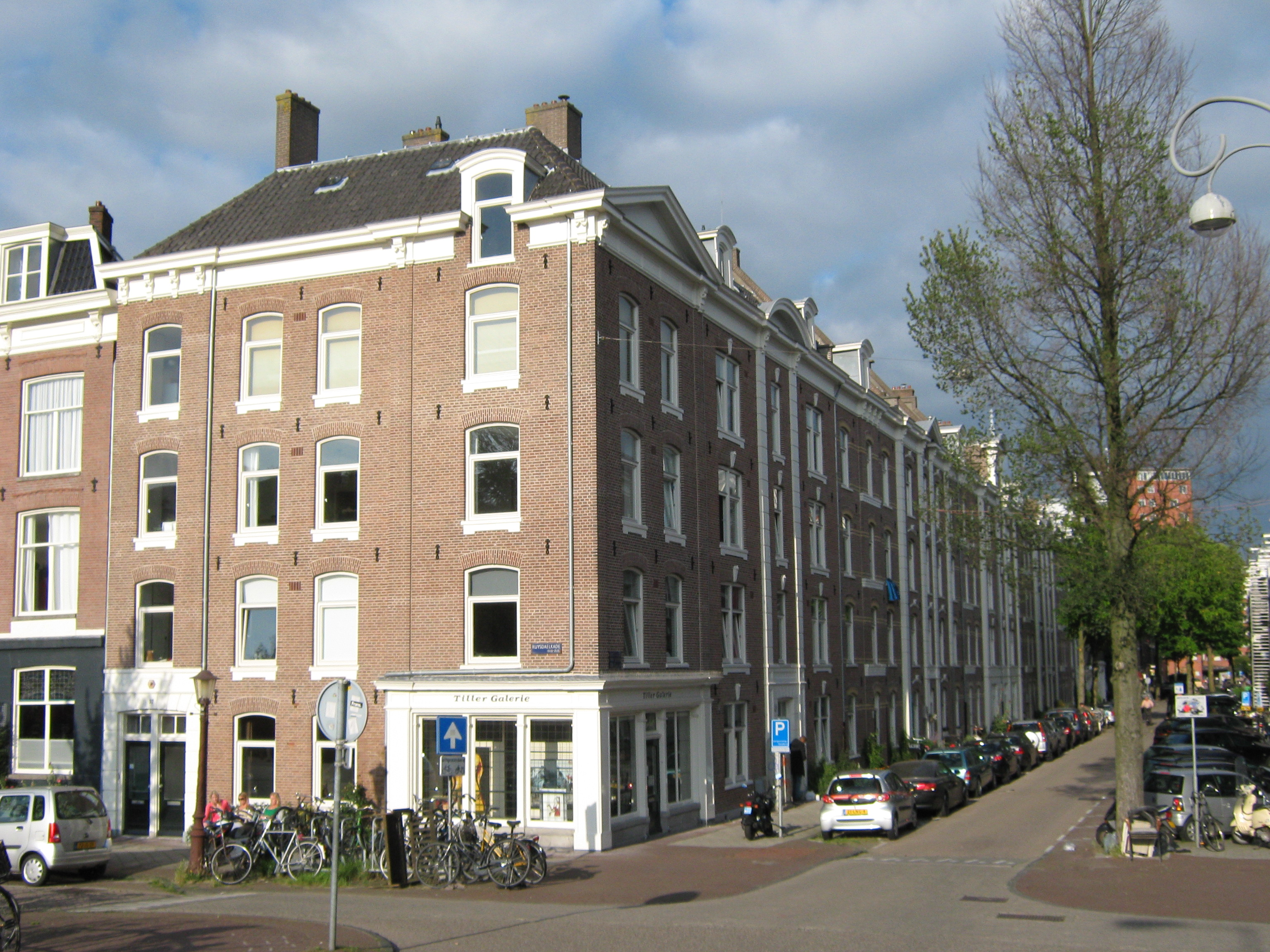
Typical cheap late 19th century corporation housing in Amsterdam

In the Netherlands there are three very different types of organization that could be considered a housing cooperative:

==== Housing corporation ====
A housing corporation (woningcorporatie) is a nonprofit organization dedicated to building and maintaining housing for rent for people with lower income. The first housing corporations started in the second half of the 19th century as small cooperative associations. The first such association in the world, VAK ("association for the working class") was founded in 1852 in Amsterdam. Between 2.4 and 2.5 million apartments in the Netherlands are rented by the housing corporations, i.e. more than 30% of the total of household dwellings (apartments and houses).

==== Owner association ====
A (house) owners' association (Vereniging van Eigenaren, VvE) is by Dutch law established wherever there are separately owned apartments in one building. The members are legally owners of their own apartment but have to cooperate in the association for the maintenance of the building as a whole.

==== Living cooperation ====
A living cooperation (wooncoöperatie) is a construct in which residents jointly own an apartment building using a democratically controlled cooperative, and pay rent to their own organisation. They were prohibited after World War II and legalised in 2015.

=== New Zealand ===
"Company-share" apartments operate in the New Zealand housing system.

=== Nordic countries ===
A tenant-owner's association (Swedish: bostadsrättsförening, Norwegian: borettslag, Danish: andelsboligforening) is a legal term used in the Scandinavian countries (Sweden, Denmark, and Norway) for a type of joint ownership of property in which the whole property is owned by a co-operative association, which in its turn is owned by its members. Each member holds a share in the association that is proportional to the area of his apartment. Members are required to have a tenant-ownership, which represents the apartment, and in most cases live permanently at the address. There are some legal differences between the countries, mainly concerning the conditions of ownership.

In Sweden, 16% of the population lives in apartments in housing cooperatives, while 25% live in rented apartments (more common among young adults and immigrants) and 50% live in private one-family houses (more common among families with children), the remainder living in other forms such as student dormitories or elderly homes.

In Finland, by contrast to the Scandinavian countries, housing cooperatives in the strict sense are extremely rare; instead, Finnish tenant-owned housing properties are generally organized as limited companies (Finnish asunto-osakeyhtiö) in a system peculiar to Finnish law. The Finnish arrangement is similar to a housing cooperative in that the property is owned by a non-profit corporation and the right to use each unit is tied to ownership of a certain set of shares.

=== Philippines ===
In the Philippines, a tenant-owner's association often forms as a means to buy new flats. When the cooperative is set up, it takes the major part of the loan needed to buy a property. These loans will then be paid off during a fixed period of years (typically 20 to 30), and once this is done, the cooperative is dispersed and the flats are transformed into condominiums.

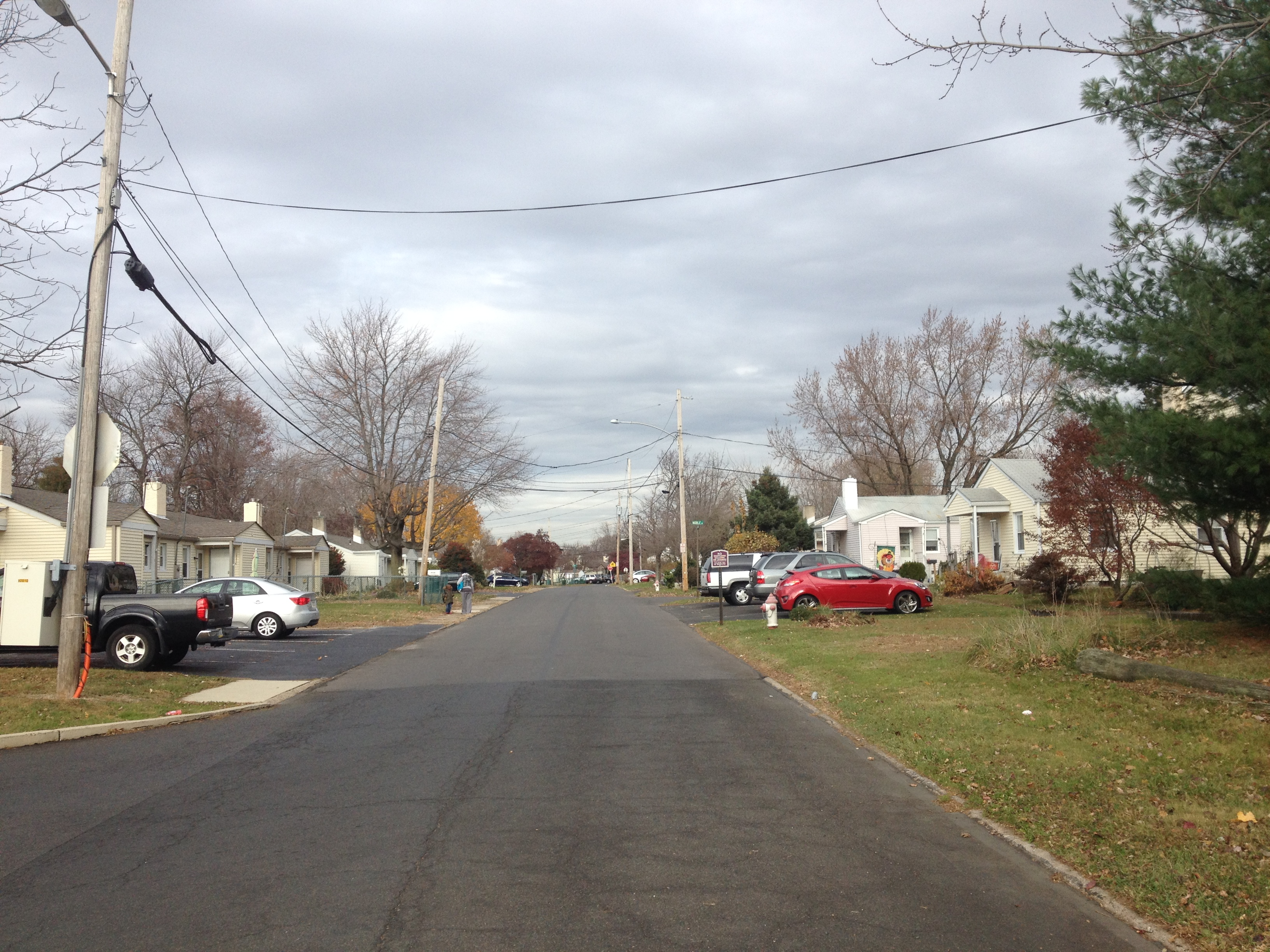
Warminster Heights, Pennsylvania was built by the Federal government in the 1940s as housing for civilian workers; it became a housing cooperative in 1986

=== United Kingdom ===
Housing co-operatives are uncommon in the UK, making up about 0.1% of housing stock.

Most are based in urban areas and consist of affordable shared accommodation where the members look after the property themselves. Waiting lists can be very long due to the rarity of housing co-operatives. In some areas the application procedure is integrated into the council housing application system. The laws differ between England and Scotland. The Confederation of Co-operative Housing provides information on housing cooperatives in the United Kingdom and has published a guide on setting them up. The Shelter website provides information on housing and has information specific to England and Scotland.

The Catalyst Collective provides information about starting co-operatives in the UK and explains the legal structure of a housing coop. Radical Routes offers a guide on how to set up a housing co-operative.

==== Student housing cooperatives ====
Factors of raising cost of living for students and quality of accommodation have led to a drive for Student Housing Co-operatives within the UK inspired by the existing North American Student Housing Cooperatives and their work through North American Students of Cooperation. Edinburgh Student Housing Co-operative and Birmingham Student Housing Co-operative opened in 2014 and Sheffield Student Housing Co-operative in 2015. All existing Student Housing Co-operatives are members of Students for Cooperation.

=== United States ===
In the United States, housing co-ops are usually categorized as corporations or LLCs and are found in abundance in the area from Madison, Wisconsin, to the New York metropolitan area. There are also a number of cooperative and mutual housing projects still in operation across the US that were the result of the purchase of federal defense housing developments by their tenants or groups of returning war veterans and their families. These developments include seven of the eight middle-class housing projects built by the US government between 1940 and 1942 under the auspices of the Mutual Ownership Defense Housing Division of the Federal Works Agency. There are many regional housing cooperative associations, such as the Midwest Association of Housing Cooperatives, which is based in Michigan and serves the Midwest region, covering Ohio, Michigan, Indiana, Illinois, Wisconsin, Minnesota, and more.

The National Association of Housing Cooperatives (NAHC) represents all cooperatives within the United States who are members of the organization. This organization is a nonprofit, national federation of housing cooperatives, mutual housing associations, other resident-owned or controlled housing, professionals, organizations, and individuals interested in promoting the interests of cooperative housing communities. NAHC is the only national cooperative housing organization, and aims to support and educate existing and new cooperative housing communities as the best and most economical form of homeownership.

NASCO, or North American Students of Cooperation, is an organization founded in 1968 that has helped organized cooperative living for students. With a presence in over 100 towns and cities across North America, NASCO has provided tens of thousands of students with sustainable housing. In Washington, D.C., tenant-purchase laws have also supported cooperative and affordable-housing preservation. The District's Tenant Opportunity to Purchase Act gives tenants an opportunity to purchase certain rental housing accommodations, and the District government provides technical and financial assistance to tenant groups seeking to acquire their buildings.

==== New York metropolitan area ====
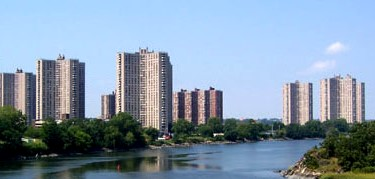
Co-op City in The Bronx, New York City is the largest cooperative housing development in the world, with 55,000 people.

Cooperatives have a long history in metropolitan New York – in November 1882, Harper's Magazine describes several cooperative apartment buildings already in existence, with plans to build more – and can be found throughout New York City, Westchester County, which borders the city to the north, and towns in northern New Jersey that are close to Manhattan, including Fort Lee, Edgewater, Ramsey, Passaic and Weehawken. Alku and Alku Toinen, apartment buildings built in 1916 by the Finnish American immigrant community in the Sunset Park neighborhood of Brooklyn, New York City, were the first nonprofit housing cooperatives in New York City.

Apartment buildings and multiple-family housing make up a more significant share of the housing stock in the New York City area than in most other U.S. cities as over 75% of apartment buildings in NYC are co-ops. Reasons suggested to explain why cooperatives are relatively more common than condominiums in the New York City area are:

- Inspired by Abraham Kazan, cooperatives appeared at least as far back as the 1920s while a legal basis for condominium form of ownership was not available in New York State until 1964. Passage of the Condominium Act then opened a wave of construction of condominium buildings.
- The cooperative form can be advantageous as a building mortgage can be carried by the cooperative corporation, leaving less financing to be obtained by each co-op owner. Under condominium ownership only the separate condo owners provide financing. Particularly when interest rates are high, a conversion sponsor may find unit buyers more easily under the cooperative arrangement as buyers will have less financing to arrange on their own; the apparent purchase price of a unit in a cooperative building holding an underlying mortgage is lower than a condo purchase. Cooperative unit buyers may not accurately weigh their share of the building's mortgage.
- Also, later in a building's life after conversion, major new investments required to repair or replace building systems can be raised by a new central mortgage in a cooperative, while in a condominium funds could only be raised by onerous assessments being required of each individual unit owner. However, New York's condominium law was amended in 1997 to allow condominium associations to borrow money.
- The 1974 creation and then subsequent influence on policy by the Urban Homesteading Assistance Board, a housing advocacy group, which enabled the conversion of over 1,600 foreclosed, city-held rentals into limited-equity, resident-controlled co-ops.
- A co-op building's board can exercise its own business discretion to impose restrictions on shareholders, and reject prospective purchasers without explanation, as long as the board does not violate federal and state housing or civil rights laws.

Most of the housing cooperatives in the greater New York area were converted to that status during the 1980s; generally, they were large buildings built between the 1920s and 1950s that a single landlord or corporation owned and rented out that became unprofitable as rental properties. To encourage individual ownership of units, the initial buyers of units (buying from the owner of the entire building) did not have to be approved by a board. These units are known as sponsor units. Also, the rental tenants living in the building at the time of the conversion were usually given an option to buy at a discount. If the tenants were rent-controlled, the law usually protects them by allowing them to stay as renters and the unit may not be occupied by a purchaser until said tenant dies or moves out. Many of these buildings, especially in Manhattan, are actually quite luxurious and exclusive; many celebrities live in them and some famous people are even rejected by co-op boards. In the 1990s and 2000s some rental buildings in the Chicago, Washington, D.C., and Miami-Fort Lauderdale-West Palm Beach areas went through a similar conversion process, though not to the degree of New York.

Many of the cooperatives originally built as co-ops were sponsored by trade unions, such as the Amalgamated Clothing Workers of America. One of the largest projects was Cooperative Village in Lower East Side of Manhattan. The United Housing Foundation was set up in 1951 and built Co-op City in The Bronx, designed by architect Herman Jessor. One of the first subsidized, fixed-value cooperatives was Morningside Gardens in Manhattan's Morningside Heights.

Another dynamic also contributed to the large number of cooperatives established in the 1980s and 1990s in New York City – in this case by low- and moderate-income tenant groups. In the 1970s, many New York City private landlords were struggling to maintain their aging properties in the face of high interest rates, redlining, white flight and rising fuel costs. The period also saw some landlord-induced arson to obtain insurance proceeds and widespread non-payment of real estate taxes – over 20% of multi-family residential properties were in arrears in the mid-1970s. In 1977, the city passed Local Law #45, which allowed the city to begin foreclosure proceedings after just one year of non-payment of taxes, not three, resulting in the takeover of thousands of buildings, many of them occupied, by the city of New York through a legal action known as an in rem foreclosure. In September 1978, the city's housing agency, the New York City Department of Housing Preservation and Development (HPD), created a series of new housing programs designed to give building residents and community groups control and eventual ownership of in rem buildings.

The Urban Homesteading Assistance Board (UHAB), established in 1974, began to assist residents of these buildings to manage, rehabilitate and acquire their buildings, and form limited-equity housing co-operatives. Working with the city's housing agency, its existing loan programs and the power to dispose of abandoned property to non-profit organizations, as well as the state laws governing the establishment of co-operatives, UHAB was able to provide low-income people with the tools – seed money, legal advice, architectural plans, bookkeeping training – to build and run limited-equity housing co-operatives. Through a long-standing contract with the city to provide training and technical assistance to residents of buildings in the Tenant Interim Lease (TIL) Program, UHAB has worked with more than 1,600 coops, preserving over 30,000 units of affordable housing.

Some cooperatives in New York City do not own the land upon which their building is situated. These 'land-lease' buildings often have significant drawbacks for cooperative owners. However, there have been cases where shareholders of a building have bought the surrounding land, such as 167 East 61st Street (formerly known as Trump Plaza), where residents gathered $183 million to buy the surrounding land.

==== Student housing cooperatives ====
Student cooperatives provide housing and dining services to those who attend specific educational institutions. Some notable groups include Berkeley Student Cooperative, Santa Barbara Housing Cooperative, the Inter-Cooperative Council at the University of Michigan, and the Oberlin Student Cooperative Association.

== See also ==
- Cohousing
- Condop
- Subsidized housing
- Worker cooperative
