= Fair Tax Mark =

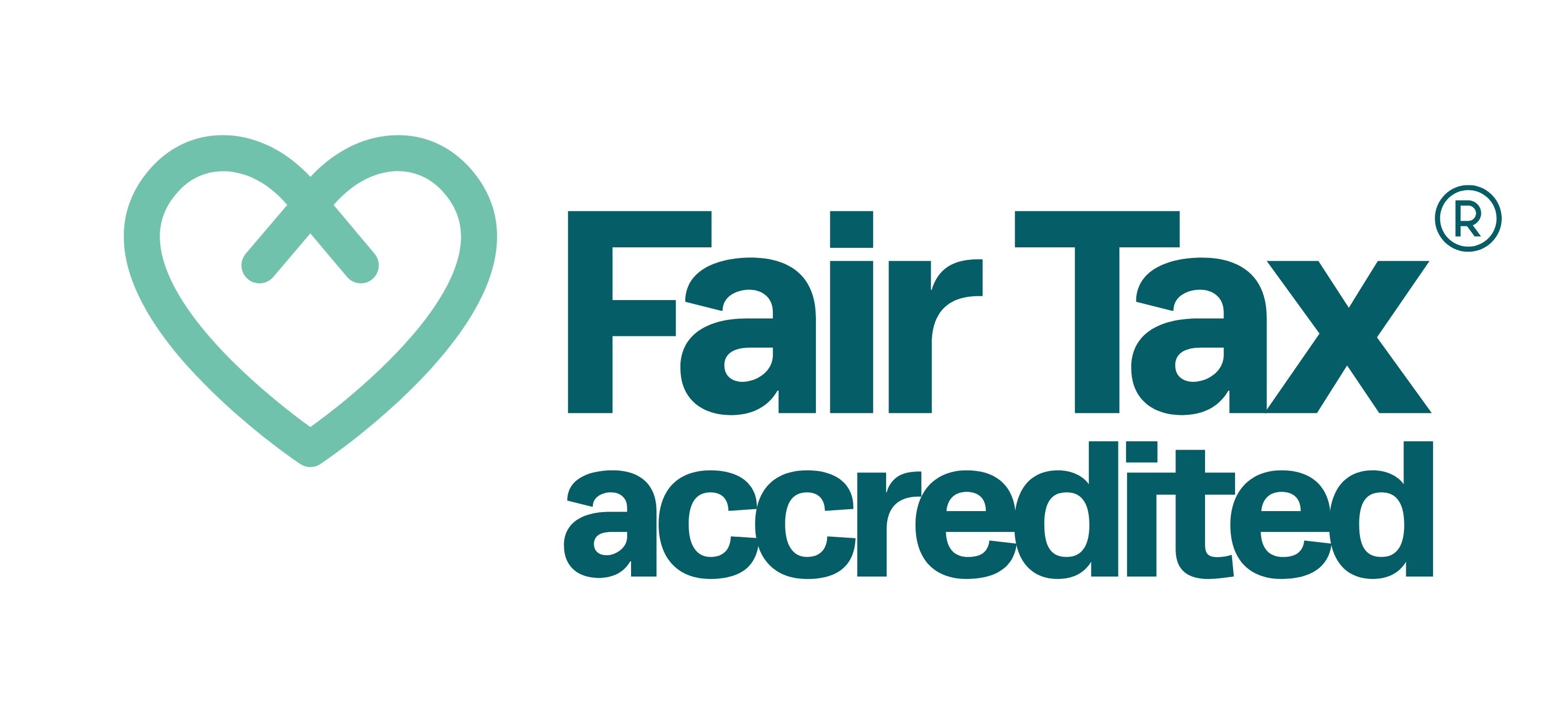
Fair Tax Mark label, as trademarked

The Fair Tax Mark is an accreditation awarded by the Fair Tax Foundation Limited, a not-for-profit community benefit society, incorporated 18 February 2014, company number IP032308. It was developed by a collaboration of tax justice, corporate social responsibility and ethical consumerism experts.

A Fair Tax Mark certified business demonstrates a substantive commitment to responsible tax conduct, financial transparency and beneficial ownership disclosure. There must be a binding tax policy that explicitly shuns tax avoidance and the artificial use of tax havens, and no recent evidence of contradicting activities. The focus of the accreditation is corporate income tax.

The Tax Justice Network assisted in raising initial funding, and it is supported by a number of other organisations including the Public and Commercial Services Union.

Initially, the label was only available to companies head-quartered in the UK, but in 2021 the label became available globally with the launch of a new business standard for multinational enterprises, with Vattenfall the first to be certified.

In 2024, the Fair Tax Foundation launched the Tax Responsibility and Transparency Index, together with CSR Europe.

== Awardees ==
The first organisations to be accredited, in February 2014, were Midcounties Co-operative, The Phone Co-op and Unity Trust Bank.

SSE plc was the first FTSE100 company to achieve the mark.

At end 2024, Ethical Consumer reported that "there are over 250 organisations who have signed up" and that there were now "certified businesses in Denmark, Finland, Germany, Italy, the Netherlands, and Sweden." Subsequently, Iberdrola became the first certified business in Spain.
