= BÜKOOP =

Consumer food cooperative at Boğaziçi University, Istanbul

- Boğaziçi Mensupları Tüketim Kooperatifi
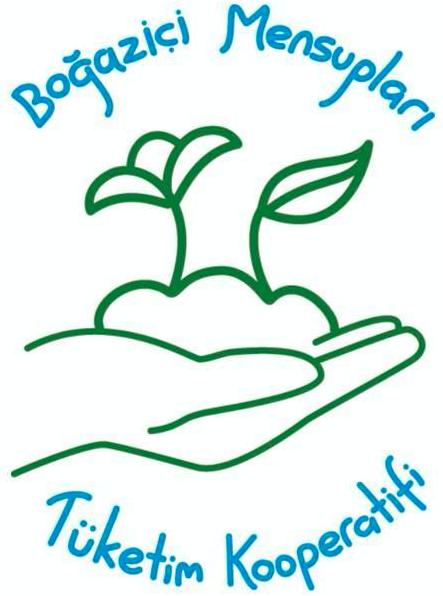

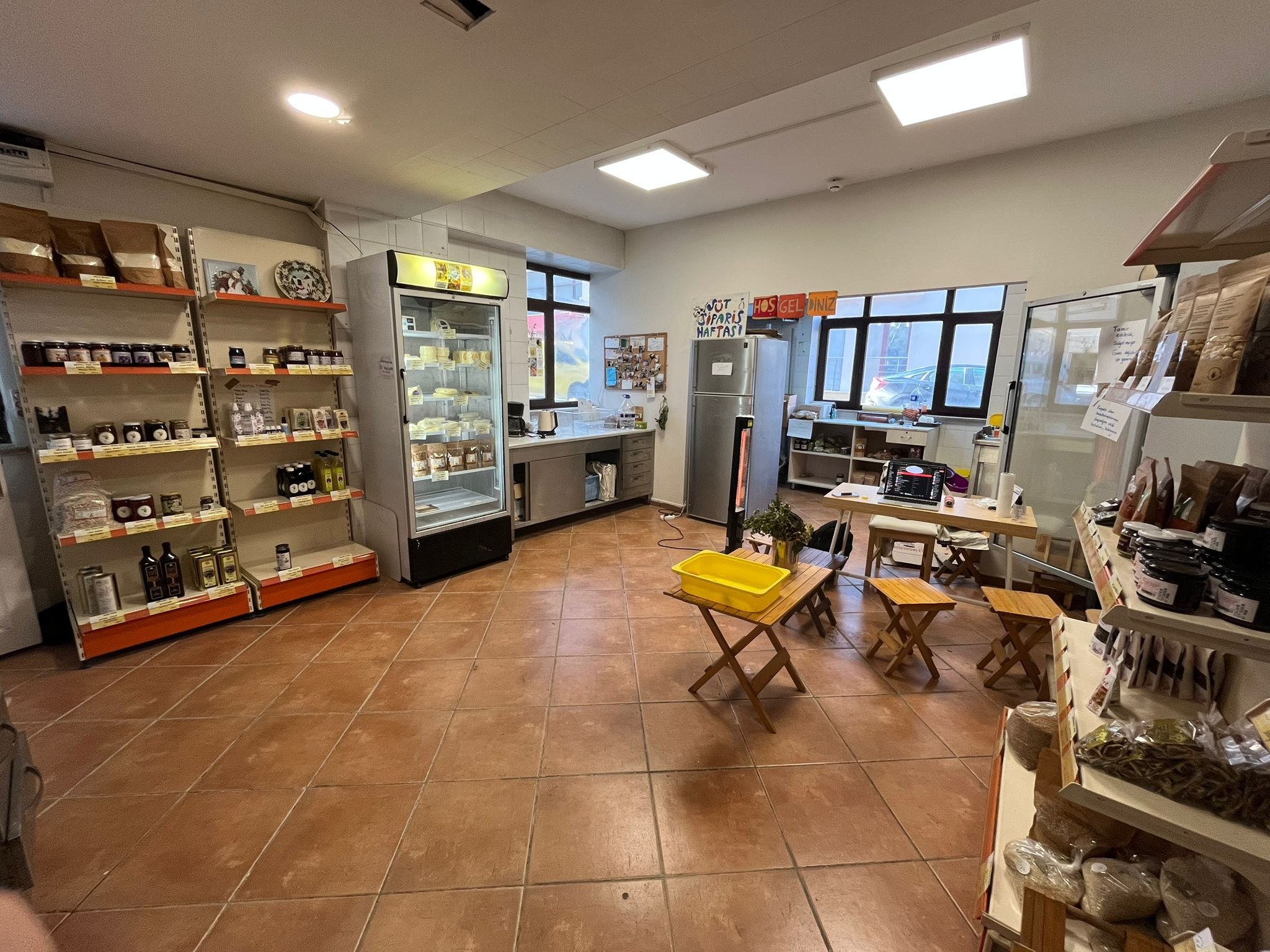
- Interior of the BÜKOOP store at Boğaziçi University (2026)
- Formation: 2009
- Type: Consumers' co-operative
- Purpose: Connecting small-scale producers with conscious consumers
- Headquarters: North Campus, Boğaziçi University, Sarıyer, Istanbul, Turkey
- Official language: Turkish
- Website: bukoop.org

BÜKOOP (Boğaziçi Mensupları Tüketim Kooperatifi, English: Boğaziçi Members' Consumers' Co-operative) is a non-profit campus cooperative organised as a consumer food co-operative, based at Boğaziçi University's North Campus in Istanbul, Turkey. Established in December 2009, the cooperative operates as a volunteer-run intermediary between small-scale agricultural producers and university-affiliated consumers, aimed at providing healthy, chemical-free food at fair prices while supporting traditional farming practices.

== History ==
The idea for BÜKOOP emerged from discussions that began in 2008–2009 within a coalition called KEÇİ (Kentlilerin Çiftçilerle Dayanışma İnisiyatifi, Urbanites' Solidarity Initiative with Farmers), which brought together members of Çiftçi-Sen (Farmers’ Union), Tohum İzi Derneği (Seed Heritage Association), academic staff, campus workers, and external activists.

BÜKOOP was formally registered in December 2009 and began operations in the spring of 2010 at Boğaziçi University's North Campus. Its initial product offerings included olives, olive oil, flour, and cheese from the Kibele producers' co-operative. In the initial 2 years, the cooperative operated with an internet-based pre-ordering system. After facing financial difficulties, it changed its system to a volunteer-based physical location known as Baraka (shack), a small building that served as both warehouse and shop.

The cooperative gradually expanded its network of producer partnerships beyond Kibele to include cooperatives and small farmers from regions across Turkey, including Elazığ, İzmir, Balıkesir, and Çanakkale.

== Organisation ==
BÜKOOP is organised horizontally without a hierarchical structure. It is run almost entirely by volunteers comprising university faculty, administrative staff, and students. The only non-volunteer position is a part-time accountant.

Membership is open to Boğaziçi University affiliates, including students, faculty, staff, and alumni. A one-time membership fee of 100 Turkish lira was required in 2016.

Baraka operates on a limited schedule, opening during weekday midday and evening half-hour slots, with extended hours on Saturdays. The cooperative deliberately avoids online sales in order to maintain direct personal interaction and what it calls the "cooperative spirit".

== Principles ==
BÜKOOP generally works with producers who are small-scale and organised through a cooperative, union, or similar collective structure. It classifies its products according to the farming methods used in their production: state-certified organic production, conventionally produced food, and small-farmer agriculture using local seeds, natural fertiliser, and traditional methods.

Rather than relying on official organic certification, which requires significant economic resources from producers, BÜKOOP has been implementing participatory certification (Turkish: Katılımcı Sertifikasyon). Under this model, organised producers and consumers mutually audit each other, building trust-based verification as an alternative to costly third-party certification.

== See also ==
- Boğaziçi University
- Consumer cooperative
- Tarlataban
- Food sovereignty
