= The Phone Co-op =

UK based co-operative telecoms supplier

- “The Phone Co-op” logo used until 2018.
- Company type: Consumer co-operative
- Industry: Telecommunications
- Founded: 1998; 28 years ago
- Defunct: 2018
- Fate: Merged with Midcounties Co-operative, rebranded to Your Co-op
- Headquarters: Chipping Norton and Manchester
- Area served: United Kingdom
- Products: Fixed line telephony, broadband, fibre broadband, mobile telephony, telephone systems, Voice over IP (VoIP), leased line, domain names, web hosting, telephone conferencing
- Revenue: £12.54 million (2016) ^{1}
- Operating income: £182,826 (2016) £164,614 (2015)
- Net income: £326,546 (2016) ^{2} £280,334 (2015)
- Members: 11,734 (2016)
- Number of employees: 74 (2016 average)
- Parent: Midcounties Co-operative
- Website: www.thephone.coop
- Footnotes / references 1. Figures rounded from 2015-2016 Annual Report 2. UK cooperative taxation means that after tax surplus is also after distributions

The Phone Co-op was an independent consumer co-operative in the United Kingdom. It provided landline, mobile telephone and Internet services, including web hosting and broadband. In April 2018, the Phone Co-op board agreed for its operations to be transferred to the Midcounties Co-operative, with the Phone Co-op legal entity ceasing to exist. The brand continued to be operated until 1 June 2018, when it was rebranded to Your Co-op following the completion of the transfer.

The co-op was a social enterprise and was awarded the title of UK customer-facing social enterprise of the year 2015. The business was a living wage employer and was accredited to hold the Fair Tax Mark.

As of 2015, the business had over 30,000 customers, spanning individuals, businesses, charities, local authorities and other co-operatives including: Amnesty International, The Big Issue, Christian Aid, Central England Co-operative Society, the Centre for Alternative Technology, Chelmsford Star Co-operative Society, The Co-operative Group, The Council of the Isles of Scilly, Manchester City Council, The Midcounties Co-operative, Triodos Bank and UNISON. Alongside organic growth, The Phone Co-op acquired other telecommunications businesses, most notably the telecoms business of Saga Group in 2010 and the broadband business of Namesco in 2014. The business provided its fixed-line services through the network run by Openreach using Local Loop Unbundling, and it provided mobile services as a virtual operator on the EE network.

== Differentiators ==
The Phone Co-op followed the widely recognised Rochdale Principles of co-operation, including the payment of a dividend to its members based on how much they spend with the co-operative during the year. The dividend was paid out of profits generated by the co-operative and for year ending 31 August 2016 was 1.5% of each member's spend. In common with many other co-operatives, the Phone Co-op sought to operate to high ethical and environmental standards, publishing extensive non-financial data in its annual report.

It operated an affinity marketing scheme, where like-minded partners received a revenue share in return for introducing its supporters to the Phone Co-op's services. Participating organisations included New Internationalist, Positive News, The Soil Association and World Development Movement. For the three years ending 31 August 2016, just over £180,000 was paid out to the affinity partners.

The business operated a "Co-operative & Social Economy Development Fund" financed through retained earnings to support the development of new social enterprises and co-operatives in the UK by investing in their share capital. Over £300,000 was invested in this way, with beneficiaries including Torrs Hydro, Go-op, Westmill Wind Farm Co-operative and the Birmingham Student Housing Co-operative.

== Awards ==
- 2008: received the UK Government-sponsored Enterprising Solutions Award for Best Social Enterprise 2008.
- 2012: awarded the Green Award of trade body, the Federation of Communications Services, for the fourth year running.
- 2013: Finalist in Overall Social Enterprise of the Year category at the 15th Social Enterprise Awards.
- 2014: Awarded Fair Tax Mark for fair tax behaviour.
- 2015: won Best Consumer-facing Social Enterprise award at 2015 UK Social Enterprise Awards.
- 2016: won Growing Co-operative of the Year category at the 2016 Co-operative of the Year awards, run by Co-operatives UK.

== Accreditations ==
- 2013: Accredited as a Living Wage Employer by the Living Wage Foundation.
- 2014: In first trio of organisations accredited for the Fair Tax Mark, along with Midcounties Co-operative and Unity Trust Bank, and is accordingly named Fair Tax Pioneer.
- 2017: Gained accreditation to the Investors in People standard.

== Strategy ==
At the Annual General Meeting of 3 February 2018, the board presented a plan to boost sales to businesses by investing the co-operative's reserves and part of the members' share capital in updating systems and raising pay. Members voiced their concern about the risks involved and urged the board to be more transparent in its communication. At a Special General Meeting on 28 April 2018 members voted 136:50 for a motion supporting the strategy. However this was only after voting 202:17 to transfer the co-op's engagements to (i.e. merge with) Midcounties Co-operative Society, which had greater resources and the potential to cross-sell to its Co-operative Energy customers. Since both votes were open to all circa 11,700 members, the vote turnout was less than 2%. A confirmatory vote on the transfer of engagements was held on 12 May 2018 in Droitwich where it was passed by 75 votes out of 76. The transfer took place on 1 June 2018.

== Other history ==
- 1998: founded as SETCO (Social Economy Telecommunications Co-operative), incorporated as a company limited by guarantee. Initially, membership of the co-operative was reserved exclusively for other co-ops and charities.
- 1999: rule change opened membership to the general public in August. SETCO renamed itself The Phone Co-op and converted into a co-operative society incorporated under the Industrial & Provident Societies Acts.
- 2010: acquired the telecoms business of Saga Group, including approximately 8,000 residential customers.
- 2012: concluded a brand licensing agreement with Co-operative Brands Limited to use The Co-operative brand with three specific sub-brands, The Co-operative Phone & Broadband, The Co-operative Business Telecoms, and The Co-operative Mobile.
- 2013: Partnered with the UK charity Community Network to take over its teleconferencing platform, allowing the charity to focus on serving its clients.
- 2014: invested £500,000 in public transport social enterprise HCT Group.
- 2014: became the UK's sole stockist of Fairphone 1 ethical smartphones.
- 2014: acquired the broadband business of Namesco.
- 2014: launched a Pay As You Go (PAYG) SIM card in conjunction with The Co-operative Group, to complement the existing postpaid mobile service. Available in approximately 3,800 branches of The Co-operative Food.
- 2015: partnered with Fairphone to release their second generation modular smartphone, Fairphone 2, in the UK.
- 2017: brought service sub-brands in line with the name of the organisation since 1999, The Phone Co-op, in place of the names adopted using The Co-operative brand in 2012. The new brand identity incorporates the Global Cooperative Marque promoted by the International Co-operative Alliance.
- 2017: Founder Vivian Woodell stepped down to head the new Phone Co-op Foundation for Co-operative Innovation
- 2018: Membership voted to transfer engagements to Midcounties Co-operative Society
- 2021: Following a reduction in users of their PAYG service, the company announced that they would be closing their Pay as You Go service.

== See also ==
- British co-operative movement
- Utility co-operative
- Fairphone
