= Sheffield Student Housing Co-operative =

Sheffield Student Housing Co-operative Limited
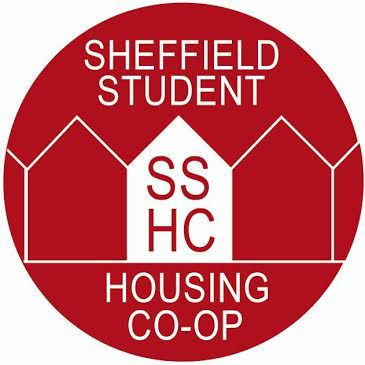
- Sheffield Student Housing Co-operative logo
- Trade name: Sheffield Student Housing Co-operative
- Company type: Cooperative; Industrial and provident society
- Industry: Student housing
- Founded: Sheffield, England (2012)
- Headquarters: Sheffield, England
- Members: 5
- Website: sshc.sheffield.coop

Sheffield Student Housing Co-operative is a student housing cooperative in the United Kingdom, providing not-for-profit, self managed housing for the co-operative's members. The co-operative started organising in 2012. The project suffered delays due to planning and legal issues, and the first property was secured in 2015.

The co-operative manages a property on Northfield Road in Crookes, Sheffield. The property is leased from The Phone Co-op who acquired the property on behalf of the Housing Co-operative The co-operative is a member of Students for Cooperation, a federation of student co-operatives across the UK, alongside the UK's two other operating student housing co-operatives, Edinburgh Student Housing Co-operative and Birmingham Student Housing Co-operative.
