= Tarlataban =

Community garden collective at Boğaziçi University, Istanbul

- Tarlataban Kolektifi
- Formation: 2012
- Type: Community garden collective
- Purpose: Urban agriculture, food sovereignty education
- Headquarters: South Campus, Boğaziçi University, Beşiktaş, Istanbul, Turkey
- Website: tarlataban.home.blog

Tarlataban (Turkish: Tarla Taban, literally "Field-Bottom") is a community garden collective founded in 2012 at Boğaziçi University's South Campus in Istanbul, Turkey. The collective cultivated a plot of previously unused university land using heirloom seeds and permaculture techniques, as part of a broader effort to promote food sovereignty and challenge industrial agriculture within an urban university setting.

== History ==
=== Origins in the Starbucks occupation ===
Tarlataban grew out of the Starbucks Occupation (Turkish: Starbucks İşgali) at Boğaziçi University. Towards the end of 2011, students and academics occupied a newly opened Starbucks branch on the South Campus to protest the commercialisation of campus food services and rising prices. Some participants proposed growing their own food, which led to the founding of Tarlataban in early 2012.

=== Establishment ===
The collective secured a plot of land on the South Campus from the university administration. The land had originally been donated by a professor couple with the condition that it be reserved for student use. Tarlataban began farming in the spring of 2012. Founding members included participants from the Starbucks occupation and the Boğaziçi University Environment Club (BÜÇEK).

=== Post-Gezi expansion ===
During the Gezi Park protests in June 2013, Tarlataban's model of campus-based urban agriculture gained wider attention and inspired the creation of community gardens across Istanbul, including the Roma Bostan and Moda Gezi Bostan.

=== Closure and attempted revival ===
Around 2018, the university rectorate chained the doors to the Tarlataban space, making it inaccessible. Seeds and gardening tools left in the space were destroyed. In 2019, a new group of students attempted to revive the initiative; they were denied access to the original plot but were offered an alternative location on campus. A blog post titled "Tarla'dan Tekrar Merhaba" (Hello Again from the Field) documented the revival. The last known blog activity dates to May 2020.

== Organisation ==
Tarlataban was organised horizontally as a collective, with no formal hierarchy or designated spokesperson. At its peak, the group had approximately 25 active members. The collective was open to external participants beyond the university. Participation was based on attendance at weekly gatherings in the field.

== Agricultural practices ==
The collective used exclusively heirloom seeds and employed permaculture principles. No synthetic chemicals, fertilisers, or pesticides were used. Seeds were sourced from the French-based Kokopelli heirloom seed association, from members' family connections in rural areas, and from a medicinal plant nursery in Zeytinburnu. The group practiced seed saving and composting.

Crops grown included red leaf lettuce, black cabbage (Turkish: kara lahana), celery, fennel, Pink Çanakkale tomatoes, corn, beans, strawberries, eggplants, peppers, squash, and various herbs.

== Tripartite food system ==
Tarlataban was conceived as one part of a three-part food system on the Boğaziçi campus:

1. Tarlataban — the community garden, producing fresh food
2. BÜKOOP (Boğaziçi Mensupları Tüketim Kooperatifi) — a consumer cooperative at Boğaziçi University sourcing food from small-scale producers across Turkey
3. A collective kitchen — intended to prepare affordable meals from Tarlataban's harvest and BÜKOOP's products for the campus community

When harvests exceeded the group's capacity, surplus produce was shared with a migrant solidarity kitchen in the city centre.

== Documentation ==
In 2017, the collective 66 Kolektif documented Tarlataban as part of the Bostan Hikâyeleri (Garden Stories) project, alongside the Kuzguncuk, Yedikule urban gardens, and Roma gardens. The project was supported by the Sivil Düşün programme, funded by the European Cultural Foundation and the Heinrich Böll Foundation.

== Academic coverage ==
Tarlataban has been discussed in academic literature on Istanbul's alternative food networks:

- Öz, Özlem; Aksoy, Zühre (2019). "Challenges of building alternatives: the experience of a consumer food co-operative in Istanbul". Food, Culture & Society. 22 (3).
- İnce, Ayça; Kadırbeyoğlu, Zeynep (2020). "The politics of food: Commoning practices in alternative food networks in Istanbul". In Commoning the City. Routledge.
- Öz, Özlem; Aksoy, Zühre (2023). Food Co-operatives in Turkey: Building Alternative Food Networks. Routledge.

== See also ==
- BÜKOOP
- Campus cooperative
- Community garden
- Urban agriculture
- Food sovereignty
- 2013 protests in Turkey
- Alternative food network
