= Georgetown University Alumni & Student Federal Credit Union =

Credit union run by Georgetown University students

- Type: Credit union
- Industry: Financial services
- Founded: Georgetown University, 1983
- Headquarters: Washington, D.C., United States
- Key people: Board of Directors: Violet Wood (Chief Executive Officer), Kishen Anand (Chief Financial Officer), Simone Arrington (Chief Communications Officer & Chairwoman), Pruthvi Jasty (Chief Lending Officer), Aya Albolote (Chief Investment Officer), James McGillick (Chief Strategy Officer), David Gibbs (Chief Technology Officer), Sheryn Livingstone (Chief Operating Officer), Anthony Chen (Chief Marketing Officer)
- Products: Savings; checking; consumer loans; Credit Builder Loans
- Total assets: $20.1 million
- Number of employees: 134
- Website: guasfcu.com

Georgetown University Alumni & Student Federal Credit Union (GUASFCU) is a credit union headquartered in Washington, D.C., chartered and regulated under the authority of the National Credit Union Administration (NCUA) of the US federal government. GUASFCU is the oldest and largest entirely student-run credit union in the country, both in asset size and in membership.

== History ==
In 1982, four students wanted to help the school's community with their banking, ultimately chartering the Georgetown University Student Federal Credit Union with the National Credit Union Administration on February 9, 1983. At the time, Riggs Bank was the only campus option. Students Alyce Russo, Len Schoppa, and Kyle Stevenson did much of the credit union's setup work, receiving permission from the university administration to open on the second floor of the O'Gara Building prior to its demolition in 1984. George Houston, then Georgetown University's treasurer, also helped the group by securing an investment of $100,000 from the school. GUSFCU was able to offer debit cards to members early on, due to an affinity agreement with MBNA, itself founded in 1982 by Charles Cawley, a Georgetown alumnus.

The credit union later moved to the Leavey Center, where it pays rent to the school. In 1994, GUSFCU officially became GUASFCU (the Georgetown University Alumni and Student Federal Credit Union) to emphasize the importance of alumni to its membership base. In the wake of the September 11 attacks, the credit union matched any donations made to the Red Cross by members. In 2007, the credit union helped organize seminars for graduating seniors on financial literacy. The credit union celebrated its 25th anniversary in 2008 with an address from the Vice Chairman of the National Credit Union Administration, Rodney E. Hood, who praised the union for its service. In 2010, the organization was criticized for sharing its customer list with Bank of America as part of a seven-year affinity agreement the banks signed in 2007. In 2011, GUASFCU worked with The Corp and The Hoya to create the Reimagine Georgetown Partnership, which gave grants of between $500 and $10,000 toward innovative campus projects. That year they also built upon previous efforts begun in 2006 with their ₵ommon $ense financial literacy courses for graduating seniors, expanding the weekly courses to a full month.

Despite the arrival of a PNC bank branch on campus in the fall of 2009, GUASFCU assets rose to $12.4 million. By fall 2010, they rose to over $16 million, with over 10,000 individual members. As of spring 2021, GUASFCU has over $18 million in AUM. GUASFCU supports a variety of philanthropic events benefiting the Georgetown community, the greater D.C. area, and national charities and foundations, including Relay For Life, Run 4 Rigby, Georgetown Rangila, and the John Thompson III Foundation.

Today, the organization remains entirely student-run, “from the teller to the CEO.” In 2011, the credit union had 105 student “interns”, who worked up to fifty hours each week.

== Membership and services ==
GUASFCU's field of membership is agreed with the National Credit Union Administration. As with all credit unions, membership in GUASFCU is limited to individuals sharing the common bond defined in its credit union charter. Membership in GUASFCU is limited to:

- Current Georgetown University students
- Georgetown University alumni
- Immediate family members of alumni and students

GUASFCU offers the typical suite of account services offered by most financial institutions, including savings accounts, checking accounts, and certificates of deposit. The savings product is named “Share Savings” to reflect the fact that a member's initial savings deposit ($10) literally represents their share of ownership in the credit union.

GUASFCU is part of the Allpoint ATM network, an interbank networking connecting ATMs in all 50 states. As of December 31, 2008, the Allpoint network has over 43,000 ATMs, located both inside the United States and internationally. GUASFCU members can use any of these ATMs free of charge in addition to the two GUASFCU ATMs located on campus. GUASFCU has their own app for convenience.

When opening an account, members receive a “Jack the Bulldog” debit card. GUASFCU launched GUASFCU Rewards to incentivize its members to use their GUASFCU debit card by partnering with local restaurants, retail stores, and more for GUASFCU members to receive discounts. GUASFCU Rewards expands its partnerships by using social media platforms on Instagram and Facebook to broadcast its discounts. GUASFCU has had discounts with businesses such as: The Tombs, Domino's, Los Cuates, Bluestone Lane, Pinstripes, Flavio, Sugar Lab, Pie Sisters, Booey's, Lou Lou, Saxby's, and more.
