= Birmingham Student Housing Co-operative =

Birmingham Student Housing Co-operative Limited
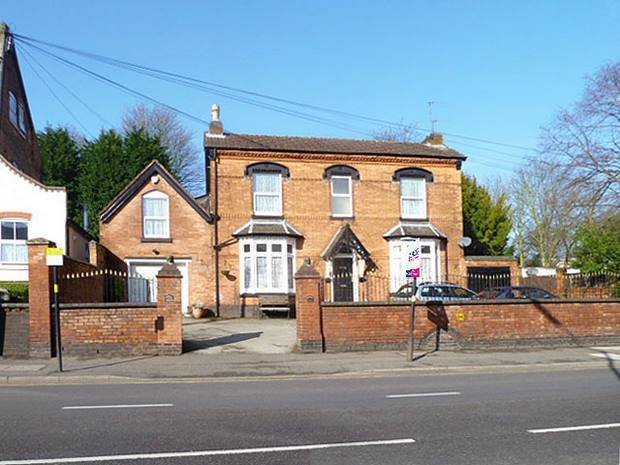
- The co-operative's property on Pershore Road.
- Trade name: Birmingham Student Housing Co-operative
- Company type: Cooperative; Industrial and provident society
- Industry: Student housing
- Founded: Birmingham, England (2014)
- Headquarters: Pershore Road, Birmingham, West Midlands, England
- Members: 9

Birmingham Student Housing Co-operative is a student housing cooperative in the United Kingdom, providing affordable self managed housing for the co-operative's nine student members. The co-operative was the first operational student housing co-operative in the UK when it opened in June 2014.

The co-operative manages a property on Pershore Road in Selly Oak, Birmingham. The property is leased from The Phone Co-op who acquired the property on behalf of the Housing Co-operative through its 'Co-operative and Social Economy Development Fund'. The co-operative is a member of Students for Cooperation, a federation of student co-operatives across the UK, alongside the UK's two other operating student housing co-operatives, Edinburgh Student Housing Co-operative and Sheffield Student Housing Co-operative.

== Progress ==
Since its opening in June 2014, Birmingham Student Housing Co-operative has charged students a relatively low price for accommodation whilst making significant improvements to the property. Whilst many of these improvements have been made by the tenants or friends of the tenants living within it or hired professionals using their own co-op's budget, other improvements have only been possible so quickly with financial contributions for home improvements from The Phone Co-op.

As of December 2016, improvements include: converting part of the huge lounge into a reasonably sized eighth bedroom, converting an unused garage into a large ninth bedroom, erecting a greenhouse, erecting a shed, installing a curtain rail and curtains in the lounge, installing shelving in the lounge-kitchen-bedrooms, installing a large raised bed in the garden and re-building a garden wall.

== Tenancy applications ==
Birmingham Student Housing Co-operative opens applications at least twice per year to find new students that wish to live in the co-op. The application process consists of filling out an application form and a visit to the co-op by the applicant. Selection of new tenants is a transparent and democratic process, involving all of the current tenants living in the co-op.
