= Students for Cooperation =

- Abbreviation: SfC
- Formation: June 2013; 13 years ago
- Type: Co-operative federation
- Purpose: To develop and support the UK's student co-operative movement.
- Members: 24 food co-ops, 4 housing co-ops, 1 bike co-op, 1 swap/re-use co-op
- Staff: 2

Students for Cooperation (SFC) is a co-operative federation of students in the UK. As a secondary co-op, the organization is owned and controlled by its constituent member co-operatives.

The membership includes twenty four food co-ops, four housing co-ops, one bike co-op and one swap/re-use co-op.

== Conferences ==
Students for Cooperation hosts between 2-3 conferences a year. These conferences move between different locations - generally in different university cities in which student cooperatives are based. These conferences feature forums for debate and discussion about the direction of Students for Cooperation, workshops to train individuals in member cooperatives and sessions provided by guest speakers from the wider Co-operative Movement.

The conferences also facilitate General Meetings in which policy proposals can be submitted by member cooperatives for Students for Cooperation to adopt. The founding conference was held at the University of Birmingham and featured a guest speaker from North American Students of Cooperation.

== National Body of Student Housing Cooperatives (NBSHC) ==
Students for Cooperation through funding obtained from the East of England Co-operative Society contracted Acorn Co-operative Support to undertake a primary report into the establishment of a National Body of Student Housing Cooperatives to address issues holding back the growth of existing student housing cooperatives and the establishment of new ones across the UK. The report in part was inspired by the successes seen in the US and Canada by the work of North American Students of Cooperation.

== See also ==
- Birmingham Student Housing Co-operative
- Edinburgh Student Housing Co-operative
- Sheffield Student Housing Co-operative
