= Unity Trust Bank =

UK-based commercial bank serving socially focused organisations

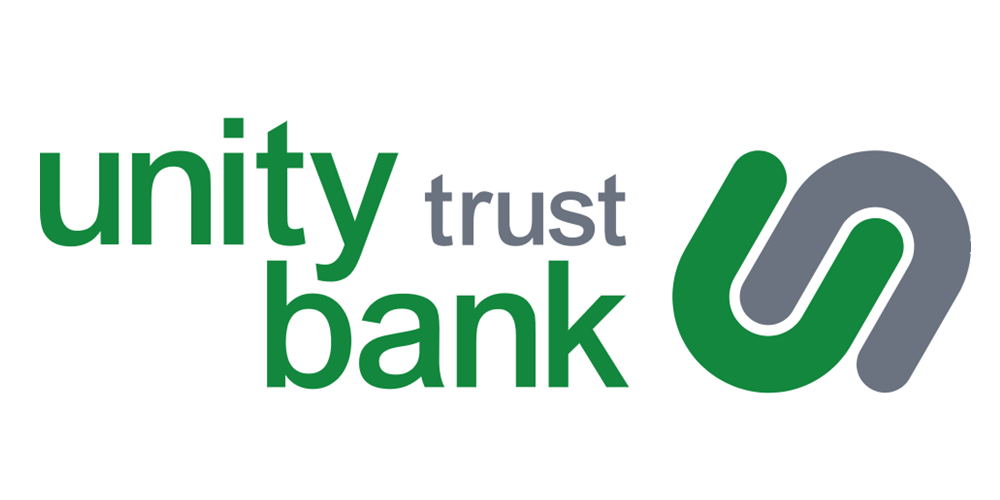
- Type: Public limited company
- Industry: Financial services
- Founded: 1984
- Headquarters: Birmingham, United Kingdom
- Area served: United Kingdom
- Key people: Christine Coe (chair); Colin Fyfe (CEO)
- Products: Business banking, savings
- Revenue: ▼£95 million (2025)
- Operating income: ▼£52.4 million (2025)
- Net income: ▼£40.8 million (2025)
- Total assets: ▲£2.19 billion (2025)
- Total equity: ▲£264 million (2025)
- Website: www.unity.co.uk

Unity Trust Bank plc provides specialist business banking services to trade unions, charities and other organisations that operate in the not-for-profit sector in the United Kingdom and, since 2015, its remit has expanded to include profit-with-purpose businesses. Founded in 1984, head office is located at Four Brindleyplace, Birmingham.

== History ==
Originally a licenced deposit taking institution, Unity Trust Limited acquired full status as a bank in 1987.

=== Ownership ===
Historically, Unity Trust Bank was majority owned by individual trade unions and federations (73.23%) and The Co-operative Bank owned the remainder (26.7%) through its subsidiary, Co-operative Commercial Limited. In 2015, Unity bought back shares from Co-operative Commercial Limited, which reduced The Co-operative Bank's holding to 6.7%.

Unity Trust's new articles of association redesignated all shares into a single class, all ranking pari passu, and removed the different rights of the old classes and created additional shares. As a result, new shareholders have invested in Unity Trust and the Co-operative Bank no longer has a controlling interest or the right to appoint directors.

The Co-operative Bank's stake was put up for sale in 2014, in an attempt to restore Coop Bank's profitability following a capital shortfall.

== Activities ==
In its founding principles, the bank was established as “an organisation identified with and embracing the philosophy of the common good.” It promotes a socially responsible and sustainable approach to banking and lending. Unity Trust Bank was rated top in eight out of nine customer satisfaction categories in the Charity Finance Banking Survey 2015. In 2013, it became the first British bank to be awarded the Living Wage Employer Accreditation Mark.

The Co-operative Bank acted as the bank's clearing agent until 2015, when accounts migrated to a NatWest sort code.

== See also ==
- Trade unions in the United Kingdom
- Credit unions in the United Kingdom
- Social economy
