= Edinburgh Student Housing Co-operative =

Student housing co-operative in Edinburgh, Scotland

Edinburgh Student Housing Co-operative Limited
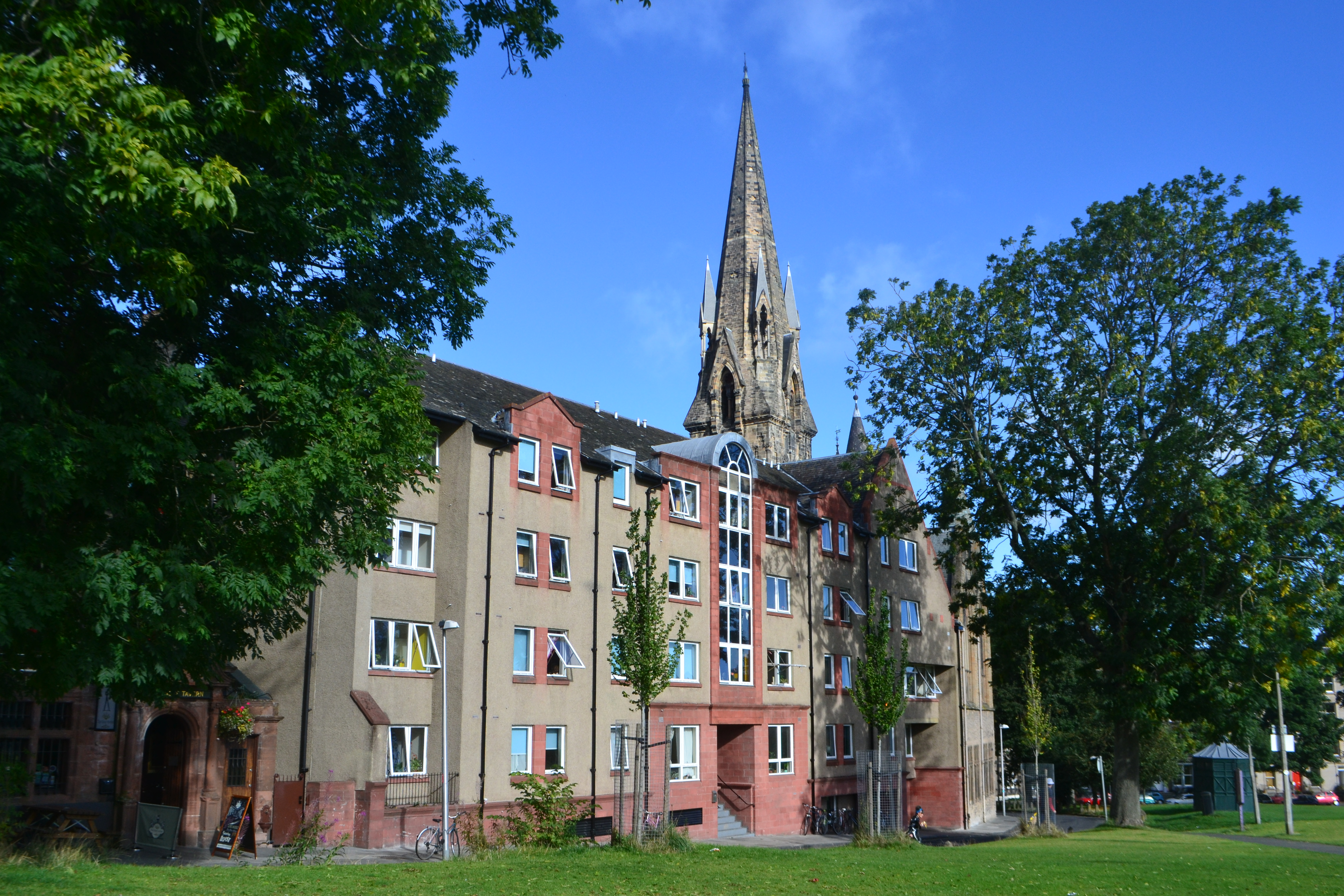
- 34 Wright's Houses.
- Trade name: Edinburgh Student Housing Co-operative
- Company type: Cooperative; Industrial and provident society
- Industry: Student housing
- Founded: Edinburgh, Scotland (2014)
- Headquarters: Edinburgh, Scotland, UK
- Members: 106
- Website: www.eshc.coop

Edinburgh Student Housing Co-operative is the largest student housing cooperative in the United Kingdom, providing affordable housing for the co-operative's 106 student members. The co-operative opened in the summer of 2014.

The co-operative manages two neighbouring properties at Wright's Houses in Bruntsfield, Edinburgh, overlooking the historic Bruntsfield Links. It is also notable for organising and managing itself using a system of direct democracy, with as much of the work as possible undertaken directly by its members.

The co-operative is a member of Students for Cooperation, a federation of student co-operatives across the UK, alongside the UK's two other operating student housing co-operatives, Birmingham Student Housing Co-operative and Sheffield Student Housing Co-operative.

== Governance ==
The co-operative is managed by the students which live there, with all 106 members having an equal say in the running of the buildings. The sovereign decision-making body of the co-operative is the General Meeting which takes place on a bi-weekly basis and is open to all members. The General Meeting has a required quorum of 25, meaning that if too few members attend then proposals cannot be passed.

Most of the work required to run the co-operative is delegated to six working groups; Finance, Places, Membership, Maintenance, Welfare, Participation, and Communications and Outreach. These working groups meet on a weekly basis and report directly to the General Meeting. Each working group has a specific remit, whether finances, logistics, maintenance, development, outreach, conflict mediation, or encouraging involvement. Attendance at working group meetings is entirely voluntary though strongly encouraged and all working groups are open to all members.

== Community ==
The student co-operative is home to a broad range of people from a variety of different backgrounds with a significant portion of the community coming from abroad. Membership is open to all students although there is a majority from the University of Edinburgh due to its proximity, some members study at Edinburgh College and others at Edinburgh Napier University. Despite the majority of members being undergraduate students, there is also a sizeable postgraduate community at the co-operative.

== Application and admittance ==
There are currently three principal application periods for membership of the co-operative, these are in February, April and October for admittance in June, September and January respectively, however move-in dates are often flexible. Applications are evaluated anonymously and are then voted on by current members of the co-operative. A waiting list is available for applicants which are not immediately successful. There is no fee for application, and applicants may re-apply as often as they wish. There is a high demand on places at the co-operative with a ratio ten applicants for every one available space in January 2016.
