= Haringey London Borough Council elections =

Class of UK elections

A map showing the wards of Haringey from 2002 to 2022

Haringey London Borough Council is the local authority for the London Borough of Haringey in London, England. The council is elected every four years.

== Political control ==
Since the first election to the council in 1964 political control of the council has been held by the following parties:

Election	Overall control	Labour	Lib Dem	Conservative	Green	Ind.
1964	Labour	41	-	19	-	-
1968	Conservative	7	-	53	-	-
1971	Labour	41	-	19	-	-
1974	Labour	40	-	19	-	1 (Note: National Independence Party and Residents Association.)
1978	Labour	42	-	17	-	-
1982	Labour	33	-	26	-	-
1986	Labour	42	1 (Note: Liberal Party.)	16	-	-
1990	Labour	42	-	17	-	-
1994	Labour	57	-	2	-	-
1998	Labour	54	3	2	-	-
2002	Labour	42	15	-	-	-
2006	Labour	30	27	-	-	-
2010	Labour	34	23	-	-	-
2014	Labour	48	9	-	-	-
2018	Labour	42	15	-	-	-
2022	Labour	50	7	-	-	-
2026	No Overall Control	21	8	-	28	-

== Council elections ==
- 1964 Haringey London Borough Council election
- 1968 Haringey London Borough Council election
- 1971 Haringey London Borough Council election
- 1974 Haringey London Borough Council election
- 1978 Haringey London Borough Council election (boundary changes reduced the number of seats by one)
- 1982 Haringey London Borough Council election
- 1986 Haringey London Borough Council election
- 1990 Haringey London Borough Council election
- 1994 Haringey London Borough Council election (boundary changes took place but the number of seats remained the same) (Note: The Essex and Greater London (County and London Borough Boundaries) Order 1993) (Note: The Hackney, Haringey and Islington (London Borough Boundaries) Order 1993) (Note: The Haringey and Islington (London Borough Boundaries) Order 1993) (Note: The North London Boroughs (London Borough Boundaries) Order 1993)
- 1998 Haringey London Borough Council election
- 2002 Haringey London Borough Council election (boundary changes reduced the number of seats by two)
- 2006 Haringey London Borough Council election
- 2010 Haringey London Borough Council election
- 2014 Haringey London Borough Council election
- 2018 Haringey London Borough Council election
- 2022 Haringey London Borough Council election (boundary changes took place but the number of seats remained the same)
- 2026 Haringey London Borough Council election

== Borough result maps ==
2002 results map

2006 results map

2010 results map

2014 results map

2018 results map

2022 results map

2026 results map

== By-election results ==
=== 1964-1968 ===
There were no by-elections.

=== 1968-1971 ===
Town Hall by-election, 4 June 1970
Party	Candidate	Votes	%	±%
Labour	F. C. Carnell	1,234	51.6	+19.4
Conservative	R. W. Painter	1,146	47.9	−14.4
Socialist (GB)	A. J. L. Buick	11	0.5	N/A
Turnout			29.6%	
Labour gain from Conservative		Swing		

Coleraine by-election, 16 July 1970
Party	Candidate	Votes	%	±%
Labour	E. V. Garwood	2,150	63.2	+17.9
Conservative	W. R. W. Taylor	1,204	35.4	−11.6
Communist	A. Salisbury	50	1.5	−6.3
Turnout			30.4%	
Labour gain from Conservative		Swing		

=== 1971-1974 ===
Muswell Hill by-election, 1 June 1972
Party	Candidate	Votes	%	±%
Conservative	R. J. Atkins	1,787	56.4	−2.4
Labour	C. L. Silverstone	1,127	35.6	−0.2
Liberal	A. Duddington	254	8.0	+1.2
Turnout			36.8%	
Conservative hold		Swing		

Turnpike by-election, 6 July 1972
Party	Candidate	Votes	%	±%
Labour	C. L. Silverstone	1,058	65.4	+4.2
Conservative	T. W. A. Easton	510	31.5	−4.5
Liberal	J. P. Musgrove	49	3.0	N/A
Turnout			30.7%	
Labour hold		Swing		

Coleraine by-election, 8 March 1973
Party	Candidate	Votes	%	±%
Labour	M. Dinning	2,120	67.2	−4.8
Conservative	J. L. Carrington	780	24.7	+0.9
National Front	B. W. Pell	254	8.1	N/A
Turnout			28.3%	
Labour hold		Swing		

High Cross by-election, 25 October 1973
Party	Candidate	Votes	%	±%
Labour	D. C. Rumble	507	57.5	−15.8
Conservative	J. L. Carrington	223	25.3	+4.6
National Independence Party & Residents Association	F. E. Knox	100	11.4	N/A
National Front	H. C. Lord	51	5.8	N/A
Turnout			25.9%	
Labour hold		Swing		

South Tottenham by-election, 25 October 1973
Party	Candidate	Votes	%	±%
Labour	Aaron Weichselbaum	964	46.7	−17.5
National Independence Party & Residents Association	Michael Coney	730	35.4	+11.6
Liberal	P. W. O'Brien	190	9.2	N/A
Conservative	W. E. Band	139	6.7	−8.5
National Front	S. Crowther	40	1.9	N/A
Turnout			34.4%	
Labour hold		Swing		

Tottenham Central by-election, 25 October 1973
Party	Candidate	Votes	%	±%
Labour	A. D. Rumble	721	64.6	−5.3
Conservative	G. E. Ryan	218	19.5	−6.6
National Front	R. May	177	15.9	N/A
Turnout			17.1 %	
Labour hold		Swing		

=== 1974-1978 ===
Noel Park by-election, 13 November 1975
Party	Candidate	Votes	%	±%
Labour	David Barlow	1,282	44.4	−3.5
Conservative	Paul E. Hitchens	1,210	41.9	+18.4
National Front	Keith Squire	395	13.7	N/A
Turnout			26.8	
Labour hold		Swing		

High Cross by-election, 11 December 1975
Party	Candidate	Votes	%	±%
Labour	Anthony McBrearty	341	32.0	−40.4
Tottenham Ratepayers	John Dodds	301	28.2	N/A
Conservative	John L. Carrington	255	23.9	+2.2
National Front	Henry C. Lord	107	10.0	N/A
Liberal	Katherine Alexander	62	5.8	N/A
Turnout			31.7	
Labour hold		Swing		

Fortis Green by-election, 24 March 1977
Party	Candidate	Votes	%	±%
Conservative	Jean Macgregor	1,730	55.1	+0.7
Labour	Susan L. Scales	1,063	33.9	+2.5
Liberal	John C. Wildsmith	202	6.4	−4.9
National Front	Sylvia E. May	142	4.5	N/A
Turnout			38.8	
Conservative hold		Swing		

Highgate by-election, 24 March 1977
Party	Candidate	Votes	%	±%
Conservative	Anthony Dignum	1,683	59.2	+5.1
Labour	Toby J. Harris	731	25.7	−3.5
Electoral Reform Liberal	Patrick W. O'Brien	369	13.0	−3.2
National Front	Leslie G. Butler	59	2.1	N/A
Turnout			35.0	
Conservative hold		Swing		

Muswell Hill by-election, 24 March 1977
Party	Candidate	Votes	%	±%
Conservative	Benjamin R. Hall	1,774	61.3	+5.8
Labour	Jacqueline M. Goodwin	711	24.6	−5.8
Liberal	Francis A. Coleman	299	10.3	−2.0
National Front	Bruce W. Pell	109	3.8	N/A
Turnout			36.1	
Conservative hold		Swing		

=== 1978-1982 ===
Woodside by-election, 15 March 1979
Party	Candidate	Votes	%	±%
Conservative	Bernard Dehnel	1,588	59.0	+16.2
Labour	John Warren	1,010	37.5	−5.8
Liberal	Antony Zotti	95	3.5	+0.6
Turnout			35.0	
Conservative gain from Labour		Swing		

The by-election was called following the resignation of Cllr Jacqueline Goodwin.

Coleraine by-election, 21 February 1980
Party	Candidate	Votes	%	±%
Labour	John Elkington	1,549	60.7	+11.8
Conservative	Christopher Palmer	895	35.1	+10.6
National Front	Robert Frost	106	4.2	−1.1
Turnout			32.0	
Labour hold		Swing		

The by-election was called following the resignation of Cllr Eric Garwood.

Seven Sisters by-election, 21 February 1980
Party	Candidate	Votes	%	±%
Labour	Paul Loach	1,020	72.3	+20.2
Conservative	Michael Coney	305	21.6	−7.4
Liberal	Hugo Reading	58	4.1	N/A
National Front	Colin Mates	27	1.9	−5.3
Turnout			31.3	
Labour hold		Swing		

The by-election was called following the resignation of Cllr Leslie Collis.

Alexandra by-election, 25 September 1980
Party	Candidate	Votes	%	±%
Conservative	Ralph Cleasby	1,148	41.1	−5.7
Labour	Elizabeth Simons	989	35.4	+1.1
Liberal	Clive World	655	23.5	+11.9
Turnout			36.9	
Conservative hold		Swing		

The by-election was called following the resignation of Cllr Timothy Allen.

South Tottenham by-election, 9 October 1980
Party	Candidate	Votes	%	±%
Labour	Andy Love	1,046	50.9	+3.7
Conservative	Michael Coney	1,009	49.1	+13.0
Turnout			38.3	
Labour hold		Swing		

The by-election was called following the resignation of Cllr Aaron Weichselbaum.

Coleraine by-election, 20 November 1980
Party	Candidate	Votes	%	±%
Labour	Anthony Rigby	1,441	56.3	+7.4
Conservative	Leonard Jackson	812	31.7	+7.2
Liberal	Alexander L'Estrange	305	11.9	N/A
Turnout			32.2	
Labour hold		Swing		

The by-election was called following the resignation of Cllr John Elkington.

Hornsey Vale by-election, 2 July 1981
Party	Candidate	Votes	%	±%
Labour	Vivienne Fenwick	826	47.4	−2.0
Conservative	Peter Gilbert	497	28.5	−7.3
Alliance	Richard Kennard	418	24.0	+14.2
Turnout			35.9	
Labour hold		Swing		

The by-election was called following the resignation of Cllr Michael Killingworth.

=== 1982-1986 ===
Harringay by-election, 20 October 1983
Party	Candidate	Votes	%	±%
Labour	Donald Billingsley	1,345	55.2	−2.6
Conservative	Christine Sampson	749	30.7	+9.6
Alliance	Kevin Twaite	344	14.1	−1.5
Turnout			34.8	
Labour hold		Swing		

The by-election was called following the resignation of Cllr Jeremy Corbyn.

Alexandra by-election, 12 April 1984
Party	Candidate	Votes	%	±%
Labour	Sharon Lawrence	1,375	39.8	+12.1
Conservative	Diana Bannister	1,133	32.8	−8.8
Alliance	Elizabeth Harrington	918	26.6	+0.4
Independent	Georgia Adamides	15	0.4	N/A
Independent	Audrey O'Dell	15	0.4	N/A
Turnout			49.4	
Labour gain from Conservative		Swing		

The by-election was called following the resignation of Cllr Cecil Baylis.

Archway by-election, 12 April 1984
Party	Candidate	Votes	%	±%
Labour	Clive Boutle	881	39.5	+12.4
Conservative	Andrew Mitchell	859	38.5	−5.0
Alliance	Sheila Smith	411	18.4	−6.9
Ecology	Paul Butler	57	2.6	−0.5
Ind. Conservative	Walter Hurry	17	0.8	N/A
Independent	Ron Aitken	8	0.4	N/A
Turnout			45.2	
Labour gain from Conservative		Swing		

The by-election was called following the resignation of Cllr Alistair Burt.

Woodside by-election, 12 April 1984
Party	Candidate	Votes	%	±%
Labour	Jim Gardner	1,728	55.1	+18.6
Conservative	Dorothy Cowan	1,045	33.3	−8.2
Alliance	John Warren	362	11.5	−5.6
Turnout			43.2	
Labour gain from Conservative		Swing		

The by-election was called following the resignation of Cllr Eva Robinson.

Highgate by-election, 14 June 1984
Party	Candidate	Votes	%	±%
Conservative	Andrew Mitchell	1,265	56.6	+0.4
Labour	Barbara Simon	480	21.5	+10.4
Alliance	Barrie Cooper	446	20.0	−4.8
Ecology	Paul Butler	36	1.6	N/A
Independent	Darren Borkhataria	7	0.3	N/A
Turnout			46.3	
Conservative hold		Swing		

The by-election was called following the resignation of Cllr Anthony Dignum.

White Hart Lane by-election, 25 October 1984
Party	Candidate	Votes	%	±%
Labour	Max Morris	1,291	51.7	+10.9
Conservative	Frank Kuhl	848	33.9	−0.6
Alliance	Kenneth Shepherd	338	13.5	−1.8
Ecology	Jon White	21	0.8	N/A
Turnout			34.1	
Labour hold		Swing		

The by-election was called following the resignation of Cllr Collin Ware.

Coleraine by-election, 15 November 1984
Party	Candidate	Votes	%	±%
Labour	Stephen Banerji	1,208	45.5	+4.0
Alliance	Alexander L'Estrange	952	35.8	+17.2
Conservative	Mary Callan	453	17.1	−16.3
Ecology	David Burns	43	1.6	N/A
Turnout			35.6	
Labour hold		Swing		

The by-election was called following the resignation of Cllr Anthony Rigby.

Tottenham Central by-election, 17 January 1985
Party	Candidate	Votes	%	±%
Labour	David McCulloch	996	56.8	+4.3
Alliance	Philip Hawker	451	25.7	+11.5
Conservative	Terence Wise	306	17.5	−8.0
Turnout			24.3	
Labour hold		Swing		

The by-election was called following the resignation of Cllr Iris Cressey.

=== 1986-1990 ===
Noel Park by-election, 16 July 1987
Party	Candidate	Votes	%	±%
Conservative	William Golden	2,008	53.6	+17.1
Labour	Linda Clarke	1,479	39.5	+0.6
Alliance	Ernest Cady	211	5.6	−11.3
Green	Claire Lewis	46	1.2	−2.1
Turnout			44.21	
Conservative gain from Labour		Swing		

The by-election was called following the resignation of Cllr Nigel Knowles.

Coleraine by-election, 10 September 1987
Party	Candidate	Votes	%	±%
Labour	Maureen Dewar	1,109	40.6	+4.3
Alliance	Attila Borzak	842	30.9	−1.2
Conservative	Mary Raleigh	724	26.5	+10.4
Green	Nina Armstrong	54	2.0	−0.5
Turnout			32.24	
Labour hold		Swing		

The by-election was called following the resignation of Cllr Beth Simons.

Green Lanes by-election, 10 September 1987
Party	Candidate	Votes	%	±%
Labour	Patrick Tonge	695	46.1	−11.8
Conservative	Nityanand Ragnuth	662	43.9	+19.3
Alliance	Philip Minshull	96	6.4	−4.1
Green	David Burns	55	3.6	N/A
Turnout			25.38	
Labour hold		Swing		

The by-election was called following the resignation of Cllr Anne Douglas.

Fortis Green by-election, 17 December 1987
Party	Candidate	Votes	%	±%
Conservative	Mary Poole-Wilson	1,375	61.8	+18.7
Labour	Richard Heffernan	538	24.2	−2.8
Alliance	Robert Andrews	214	9.6	−13.4
Green	Miriam Kennet	97	4.4	−3.1
Turnout			29.43	
Conservative hold		Swing		

The by-election was called following the resignation of Cllr Jeffrey Lotery.

Bruce Grove by-election, 7 July 1988
Party	Candidate	Votes	%	±%
Labour	Ian Willmore	1,209	48.9	+5.2
Conservative	Joseph Smith	887	35.9	+10.5
Liberal Democrats	Elizabeth Mould	230	9.3	−10.4
Green	Donald Nicholls	133	5.4	−0.9
Independent	Paul Patterson	14	0.6	N/A
Turnout			29.25	
Labour hold		Swing		

The by-election was called following the resignation of Cllr Bernie Grant.

Bowes Park by-election, 6 October 1988
Party	Candidate	Votes	%	±%
Conservative	Terrence Pope	1,265	48.8	+13.2
Labour	Polydoros Polydorou	947	36.5	−3.0
Liberal Democrats	Deborah Aleksander	233	9.0	−9.3
Green	Jonathan Dobres	147	5.7	+1.8
Turnout			29.52	
Conservative gain from Labour		Swing		

The by-election was called following the resignation of Cllr Pat Craig-Jones.

Crouch End by-election, 6 October 1988
Party	Candidate	Votes	%	±%
Conservative	Ronald Aitken	1,269	52.6	+19.7
Labour	Paul Head	839	34.8	−0.1
Green	David Burns	162	6.7	−3.5
Liberal Democrats	Anne Williams	143	5.9	−16.3
Turnout			34.89	
Conservative gain from Labour		Swing		

The by-election was called following the resignation of Cllr Paul Loach.

Woodside by-election, 9 February 1989
Party	Candidate	Votes	%	±%
Conservative	Jim Buckley	1,419	53.5	+11.6
Labour	Jobaidur Rahman	1,126	42.4	+3.9
Liberal Democrats	Nicholas Aleksander	109	4.1	−4.4
Turnout			35.48	
Conservative hold		Swing		

The by-election was called following the resignation of Cllr Bernard Dehnel.

=== 1990-1994 ===
Noel Park by-election, 6 December 1990
Party	Candidate	Votes	%	±%
Labour	Narendra Makanji	995	41.2	+3.7
Conservative	Alpha K. Kane	919	38.1	−3.8
Centre Party	William Golden*	305	12.6	−29.3
Green	Paul Butler	71	2.9	−7.9
Liberal Democrats	Peter J. Jenner	69	2.9	−4.8
Independent	Michael E. Brosnan	55	2.3	−3.8
Turnout			30.1	
Labour gain from Conservative		Swing		

The by-election was called following the resignation of Cllr William Golden.

Bowes Park by-election, 19 March 1992
Party	Candidate	Votes	%	±%
Labour	Vivienne H. Manheim	1,615	45.6	+6.5
Conservative	David A. Allen	1,571	44.4	+1.7
Liberal Democrats	David M. Beacham	356	10.1	+0.1
Turnout			43.8	
Labour gain from Conservative		Swing		

The by-election was called following the disqualification of Cllr Terence Pope.

Bowes Park by-election, 24 September 1992
Party	Candidate	Votes	%	±%
Conservative	Sylvia G. Skipper	1,141	49.1	+8.8
Labour	Simon K. Walton	1,043	44.9	+3.2
Liberal Democrats	David M. Beacham	107	4.6	−5.4
Green	David C. Rumble	34	1.5	−12.4
Turnout			28.6	
Conservative gain from Labour		Swing		

The by-election was called following the death of Cllr Vic Butler.

Green Lanes by-election, 24 September 1992
Party	Candidate	Votes	%	±%
Labour	Neil J. Cleeveley	655	47.9	−3.7
Conservative	Andrew L. Charalambous	597	43.6	+10.1
Green	Peter Budge	61	4.5	−7.2
Liberal Democrats	Samantha C. Bowring	55	4.0	−2.7
Turnout			26.2	
Labour hold		Swing		

The by-election was called following the resignation of Cllr Andreas Mikkides.

White Hart Lane by-election, 24 September 1992
Party	Candidate	Votes	%	±%
Conservative	Philip N. Murphie	896	47.7	+7.6
Labour	Simon Jennings	816	43.5	+6.1
Liberal Democrats	Jennifer L. Perkins	127	6.8	−0.6
Green	David H. Burns	39	2.1	−9.1
Turnout			27.6	
Conservative hold		Swing		

The by-election was called following the resignation of Cllr Sheila Murphy.

Highgate by-election, 14 October 1993
Party	Candidate	Votes	%	±%
Conservative	Pamela J. Steele	772	55.7	−1.3
Labour	Sheila Peacock	432	31.2	+6.0
Liberal Democrats	Roderick R. V. L. Benziger	181	13.1	+5.5
Turnout			30.1	
Conservative hold		Swing		

The by-election was called following the resignation of Cllr William Blackburne.

=== 1994-1998 ===
Archway by-election, 24 October 1996
Party	Candidate	Votes	%	±%
Labour	Judith M. Bax	698	48.6	+2.1
Conservative	Ronald A. Aitken	503	35.0	+5.7
Liberal Democrats	June A. Anderson	163	11.3	−6.9
Green	Gillian A. Nicholas	73	5.1	−8.8
Majority		195	13.6	
Turnout		1,437	28.4	
Labour hold		Swing		

The by-election was called following the resignation of Cllr Derek Wyatt.

South Tottenham by-election, 24 October 1996
Party	Candidate	Votes	%	±%
Labour	Michael T. Green	801	78.5	+6.2
Conservative	Roger S. Kirkwood	172	16.8	−7.6
Liberal Democrats	Mo Chadirchi	48	4.7	N/A
Majority		629	61.7	
Turnout		1,021	22.1	
Labour hold		Swing		

The by-election was called following the resignation of Cllr Ian Willmore.

Green Lanes by-election, 1 May 1997
Party	Candidate	Votes	%	±%
Labour	Brian A. Haley	2,039	68.2	+1.2
Conservative	Michael Flynn	602	20.1	+4.5
Green	Lilias R. H. Cheyne	348	11.6	+1.0
Majority		1,437	48.1	
Turnout		2,989	58.0	
Labour hold		Swing		

The by-election was called following the resignation of Cllr Kerry Postlewhite.

Hornsey Central by-election, 1 May 1997
Party	Candidate	Votes	%	±%
Labour	Robert I. Binney	1,988	56.4	−2.6
Conservative	David A. Allen	741	21.0	+0.5
Liberal Democrats	Mo Chadirchi	494	14.1	+2.5
Green	David H. Burns	299	8.5	−3.0
Majority		1,247	35.4	
Turnout		3,522	68.7	
Labour hold		Swing		

The by-election was called following the resignation of Cllr Claire Tikly.

South Hornsey by-election, 1 May 1997
Party	Candidate	Votes	%	±%
Labour	Neil Garrod	1,946	60.6	−4.6
Conservative	Ronald A. Aitken	434	13.5	+3.3
Green	Jayne E. Forbes	418	13.0	−2.8
Liberal Democrats	Sam Ghibaldan	415	12.9	+0.4
Majority		1,512	47.1	
Turnout		3,213	62.5	
Labour hold		Swing		

The by-election was called following the death of Cllr Philip Jones.

=== 1998-2002 ===
South Tottenham by-election, 10 June 1999
Party	Candidate	Votes	%	±%
Labour	Iris Josiah	671	53.5	−14.6
Liberal Democrats	Neil Williams	292	23.3	+6.9
Conservative	Eric F. Lattimore	177	14.1	−1.1
Green	Peter Budge	112	8.9	N/A
Majority		379	30.2	
Turnout		1,252	26.0	
Labour hold		Swing		

The by-election was called following the resignation of Cllr Michael Green.

Muswell Hill by-election, 10 February 2000
Party	Candidate	Votes	%	±%
Liberal Democrats	Ross Laird	1,415	61.2	+8.6
Labour	Craig Turton	487	21.1	−6.6
Conservative	Brian A. Connell	288	12.5	−0.9
Green	Peter Budge	123	5.3	−5.2
Majority		928	40.1	
Turnout		2,190	28.0	
Liberal Democrats hold		Swing		

The by-election was called following the resignation of Cllr June Anderson.

White Hart Lane by-election, 14 December 2000
Party	Candidate	Votes	%	±%
Labour	Gideon Bell	395	44.6	−11.3
Conservative	Eric F. Lattimore	256	28.9	+6.3
Liberal Democrats	Neil Williams	156	17.6	+4.5
Socialist Alliance	Gary A. McFarlane	61	6.9	N/A
Green	Peter Budge	17	1.9	N/A
Majority		139	15.7	
Turnout		885	13.7	
Labour hold		Swing		

The by-election was called following the resignation of Cllr Hugh Jones.

=== 2002-2006 ===
Tottenham Hale by-election, 23 January 2003
Party	Candidate	Votes	%	±%
Labour	Lorna Reith	691	46.4	−8.1
Conservative	Tony Cox	434	29.1	+13.0
Liberal Democrats	Neville Collins	296	19.9	+5.4
Socialist Alliance	Stephen Cracknell	68	4.6	−1.8
Majority		257	17.3	
Turnout		1,489	18.8	−2.8
Labour hold		Swing		

The by-election was called following the resignation of Cllr David Prendergast.

Stroud Green by-election, 29 January 2004
Party	Candidate	Votes	%	±%
Liberal Democrats	Laura R. Edge	1,135	53.7	+35.8
Labour	William Freeman	408	19.3	−26.2
Green	Jayne E. Forbes	403	19.1	−12.5
Conservative	Toby Boutle	166	7.9	+0.2
Majority		727	34.4	
Turnout		2,112	26.0	−4.3
Liberal Democrats gain from Labour		Swing		

The by-election was called following the resignation of Cllr Josephine Irwin.

Muswell Hill by-election, 4 March 2004
Party	Candidate	Votes	%	±%
Liberal Democrats	Gail P. D. E. Engert	1,739	69.5	+9.6
Labour	Claire Kober	321	12.8	−6.1
Conservative	Roderick Allen	278	11.1	+2.2
Green	Peter Polycarpou	164	6.6	−3.3
Majority		1,418	56.7	
Turnout		2,502	32.4	−6.7
Liberal Democrats hold		Swing		

The by-election was called following the resignation of Cllr. Ross Laird.

Fortis Green by-election, 11 November 2004
Party	Candidate	Votes	%	±%
Liberal Democrats	Martin Newton	1,345	57.8	+17.4
Conservative	Douglas McNeill	550	23.6	−6.8
Labour	Mark Atkinson	298	12.8	−8.8
Green	Peter Budge	136	5.8	−5.6
Majority		795	34.2	
Turnout		2,329	27.7	−11.8
Liberal Democrats hold		Swing		

The by-election was called following the resignation of Cllr Barbara Fabian.

=== 2006-2010 ===
Highgate by-election, 6 March 2008
Party	Candidate	Votes	%	±%
Liberal Democrats	Rachel Allison	1,339	50.9	+8.4
Conservative	Peter Forrest	725	27.5	−4.9
Labour	David Heath	241	9.2	−2.5
Independent	Ralph Crisp	190	7.2	−5.8
Green	Sarah Mitchell	138	5.2	−6.6
Majority		614	23.4	
Turnout		2,633	32.9	−12.1
Liberal Democrats hold		Swing		

The by-election was called following the resignation of Cllr Justin Portess.

Alexandra by-election, 9 October 2008
Party	Candidate	Votes	%	±%
Liberal Democrats	Nigel P. Scott	1,460	49.9	−5.9
Labour	Joanna Christophides	772	26.4	+5.7
Conservative	David Douglas	443	15.2	+6.3
Green	James Patterson	221	7.6	−7.4
BNP	Frederick Halsey	27	0.9	N/A
Majority		688	23.5	
Turnout		2,923	35.0	−8.6
Liberal Democrats hold		Swing		

The by-election was called following the resignation of Cllr Wayne Hoban.

Seven Sisters by-election, 15 January 2009
Party	Candidate	Votes	%	±%
Labour	Joe Goldberg	1,032	37.1	−8.6
Conservative	Isaac Revah	968	34.8	+6.9
Liberal Democrats	David Schmitz	581	20.9	+8.1
Green	Anne Gray	166	6.0	−7.1
Independent	Lydia Rivlin	36	1.3	−23.5
Majority		64	2.3	
Turnout		2,783	31.1	+0.2
Labour hold		Swing		

The by-election was called following the death of Cllr Frederick Knight.

=== 2010-2014 ===
None

=== 2014-2018 ===
Woodside by-election 2 October 2014
Party	Candidate	Votes	%	±%
Labour	Charles Wright	1,331	56.3	−3.2
Liberal Democrats	Dawn Barnes	482	20.4	+7.6
Green	Tom Davidson	191	8.1	−4.3
UKIP	Andrew Price	161	6.8	−1.1
Conservative	Scott Green	140	5.9	−2.4
TUSC	Vivek Lehal	35	2.8	−0.3
Independent	Pauline Gibson	23	1.0	N/A
Majority		849	35.9	
Turnout		2,363	25.03	−10.47
Labour hold		Swing		

A by-election for Woodside was called following the death of Cllr Pat Egan.

Noel Park by-election 17 September 2015
Party	Candidate	Votes	%	±%
Labour	Stephen Mann	1,005	61.3	+4.7
Liberal Democrats	Derin Adebiyi	247	15.1	−0.4
Conservative	Mike Burgess	178	10.9	+4.2
Green	Mike McGowan	124	7.6	−2.8
UKIP	Neville Watson	48	2.9	−4.0
TUSC	Paul Burnham	38	2.3	N/A
Majority		758	46.2	
Turnout		1,646	18.0	−15.6
Labour hold		Swing		

A by-election for Woodside was called following the resignation of Cllr Denise Marshall.

Woodside by-election 17 September 2015
Party	Candidate	Votes	%	±%
Labour	Peter Mitchell	1,279	61.7	±0.0
Liberal Democrats	Jenni Hollis	435	21.0	+8.2
Conservative	Robert Broadhurst	141	6.8	−1.5
Green	Annette Baker	122	5.9	−6.5
UKIP	Andrew Price	95	4.6	−3.3
Majority		844	40.7	
Turnout		2,076	23.0	−12.0
Labour hold		Swing		

A by-election for Woodside was called following the death of Cllr George Meehan.

Harringay by-election 28 July 2016
Party	Candidate	Votes	%	±%
Labour	Zena Brabazon	1,054	46.2	+8.4
Liberal Democrats	Karen Alexander	765	33.6	+1.5
Green	Jarelle Francis	325	14.3	−3.5
Conservative	Cansoy Elmaz	99	4.3	−1.6
UKIP	Neville Watson	36	1.6	N/A
Majority		289	12.6	
Turnout		2,282	24.9	−15.6
Labour hold		Swing		

The by-election was triggered by the resignation of Councillor James Ryan

St. Ann's by-election 6 October 2016
Party	Candidate	Votes	%	±%
Labour	Noah Tucker	1,117	62.4	+14.2
Green	Ronald Stewart	323	18.1	−6.1
Liberal Democrats	Josh Dixon	189	10.6	+2.8
Conservative	Ellis Turrell	106	5.9	−2.1
UKIP	Janus Polenceusz	54	3.0	−3.8
Majority		794	44.3	
Turnout			20.67	−11.83
Labour hold		Swing		

A by-election for St Ann's was called following the resignation of Cllr Peter Morton.

=== 2018-2022 ===
West Green by-election 13 December 2018
Party	Candidate	Votes	%	±%
Labour	Seema Chandwani	1,273	56.6	−4.3
Liberal Democrats	Elizabeth Payne	621	27.6	+18.7
Green	Cecily Spelling	243	10.8	−3.2
Conservative	Hammad Baig	114	5.1	−4.3
Majority		652	29.0	
Turnout		2,258	24.6	−14.1
Labour hold		Swing		

The by-election was triggered by the resignation of Cllr Ishmael Osamor

=== 2022-2026 ===
Tottenham Hale by-election, 9 March 2023
Party	Candidate	Votes	%	±%
Labour	Sean O'Donovan	818	58.7	▼5.4
Liberal Democrats	Allen Windsor	203	14.6	▲5.9
Green	Emma Chan	192	13.8	▼3.2
Conservative	Angelos Tsangarides	81	5.8	▼3.3
Independent	Miraf Ghebreawariat	64	4.6	New
CPA	Amelia Allao	35	2.5	New
Turnout		1,400	20	▼7.15
Labour hold		Swing	▼9.6	

The by-election was held following the resignation of Yannis Gourtsoyannis.

Hermitage and Gardens by-election, 29 June 2023
Party	Candidate	Votes	%	±%
Labour	Anna Lawton	822	59.6	
Green	Alfred Jahn	224	16.2	
Liberal Democrats	Paul Dennison	217	15.7	
Conservative	Chris Brosnan	100	7.3	
CPA	Amelia Allao	16	1.2	
Majority		598	43.4	
Turnout		1,379		
Labour hold		Swing		

The by-election was held following the death of Cllr Julie Davies.

South Tottenham by-election, 4 October 2023
Party	Candidate	Votes	%	±%
Labour	Mark Grosskopf	1,268	68.2	
Conservative	Shloime Royde	286	15.4	
Green	Jonathan McKinley	235	12.6	
Liberal Democrats	David Schmitz	71	3.8	
Majority		982	52.8	
Turnout		1,860		
Labour hold		Swing		

The by-election was held following the resignation of Cllr Charles Adje.

White Hart Lane by-election, 4 October 2023
Party	Candidate	Votes	%	±%
Labour	Liam Carroll	1,081	59.0	
Conservative	James Barton	289	15.8	
Green	Friedrich-Paul Ernst	247	13.5	
Liberal Democrats	David Vigoureux	215	11.7	
Majority		792	43.2	
Turnout		1,832		
Labour hold		Swing		

The by-election was held following the resignation of Cllr Yvonne Say.

Hornsey by-election, 4 July 2024
Party	Candidate	Votes	%	±%
Labour	Adam Small	3,767	51.8	
Green	Jo Dowbor	1,819	25.0	
Liberal Democrats	Justin Hinchcliffe	902	12.4	
Conservative	Ioannis Blantos	495	6.8	
Independent	David Orford	288	4.0	
Majority		1,948	26.8	
Turnout		7,271		
Labour hold		Swing		

The by-election was held following the resignation of Cllr Adam Jogee.

St Ann's by-election, 10 April 2025
Party	Candidate	Votes	%	±%
Green	Ruairidh George Paton	1,059	55.16	
Labour	Stephen Tawiah	589	30.68	
Conservative	Calum McGillivray	83	4.32	
Liberal Democrats	David Beacham	70	3.65	
Reform	David Stratford	69	3.59	
TUSC	David Caplan	34	1.77	
Communist League	Tony Hunt	8	0.42	
Majority		470	24.5	
Turnout		1,920	28.84	−2.6
Green gain from Labour			{{{swing}}}	

The by-election was held following the resignation of Cllr Tammy Hymas.

=== 2026-2030 ===
Northumberland Park By-Election 25 June 2026
Party	Candidate	Votes	%	±%
Labour	Ajda Ovat	877	44.3	
Green	Rose Dakuo	839	42.4	
Reform	Ian Sinclair	106	5.4	
Conservative	Kenny Ajao	98	4.9	
Liberal Democrats	David Schmitz	60	3.0	
Majority		38	1.9	
Turnout		1,980		
Labour gain from Green		Swing		

The by-election was held following the disqualification of Cllr Jayon Henriques due to a prior criminal conviction.

Woodside By-Election 25 June 2026
Party	Candidate	Votes	%	±%
Green	Elara Shurety	1,033	43.3	
Labour	Thayahlan Iyngkaran	978	41.0	
Reform	Ruth Price	171	7.2	
Conservative	Mikeleno Fureraj	110	4.6	
Liberal Democrats	Rakeebah Rahim	93	3.9	
Majority		55	2.3	
Turnout		2,385		
Green gain from Labour		Swing		

The by-election was held following the resignation of Cllr Hasret Bozdogan.
