= South Hornsey (ward) =

Former electoral ward in the London Borough of Haringey

- Former electoral ward for the Haringey London Borough Council
- South Hornsey ward boundaries from 1978 to 1994
- Borough: Haringey
- County: Greater London
- Major settlements: Stroud Green

Former electoral ward
- Created: 1965
- Abolished: 2002
- Councillors: 1965–1978: 3; 1978–2002: 2

South Hornsey was an electoral ward in the London Borough of Haringey from 1965 to 2002. The ward was first used in the 1964 elections and last used for the 1998 elections. It returned councillors to Haringey London Borough Council.

== Councillors ==
Election	Councillor	Councillor	Councillor
1964	N. E. S. McIntosh (Lab)	B. C. St. John-Murphy (Lab)	J. E. Thexton (Lab)
1968	C. J. H. Shepherd (Con)	E. A. W. Wilkins (Con)	S. M. Ayres (Con)
1971	L. H. Lipson (Lab)	U. M. Thompson (Lab)	F. Neuner (Lab)
1974	J. B. Corbyn (Lab)	D. H. Billingsley (Lab)	F. Neuner (Lab)

Following the 1978 revision of ward boundaries, the ward elected 2 councillors until its abolition in 2002.

Election	Councillor	Councillor
1978	Arthur Jones (Lab)	Colin Sherriff (Lab)
1982	Arthur Jones (Lab)	Colin Sherriff (Lab)
1986	Arthur Jones (Lab)	Eddie Griffith (Lab)
1990	Arthur Jones (Lab)	Paul Williamson (Lab)
1994	Arthur Jones (Lab)	Sally Billot (Lab)
1997 by-election	Neil Garrod (Lab)	Sally Billot (Lab)
1998	Jane Atkinson (Lab)	Sally Billot (Lab)

== Elections ==
There was a revision of ward boundaries in Haringey in 1978. There was a very minor adjustment of the ward boundaries on 1 April 1994.

=== 1998 election ===
The election took place on 7 May 1998.

1998 Haringey London Borough Council election: South Hornsey (2)
Party	Candidate	Votes	%	±%
Labour	Sally Billot	913	56.2	−15.9
Labour	Jane Atkinson	810	49.9	−15.3
Green	Jayne Forbes	244	15.0	−0.8
Liberal Democrats	Julian Satterthwaite	224	13.8	+1.3
Independent	Simon Binks	181	11.1	N/A
Socialist Labour	Ryan Cockman	163	10.0	N/A
Conservative	Sheila Cheetham	154	9.5	−0.7
Green	Gail Scott-Spicer	131	8.1	N/A
Turnout		1,636	33.0	−13.5
Labour hold		Swing		
Labour hold		Swing		

=== 1994 election ===
The election took place on 5 May 1994.

1994 Haringey London Borough Council election: South Hornsey (2)
Party	Candidate	Votes	%	±%
Labour	Sally Billot	1,528	72.1	+11.2
Labour	Philip Jones	1,380	65.2	+11.4
Green	Jayne Forbes	334	15.8	−3.7
Liberal Democrats	Audrey Stern	264	12.5	+3.0
Conservative	Benjamin Hall	216	10.2	−7.7
Conservative	Aeronwy Harris	203	9.6	−7.1
Turnout		2,124	46.5	−3.5
Labour hold		Swing		
Labour hold		Swing		

=== 1990 election ===
The election took place on 3 May 1990.

1990 Haringey London Borough Council election: South Hornsey (2)
Party	Candidate	Votes	%	±%
Labour	Paul Williamson	1,455	60.9	+10.3
Labour	Arthur Jones	1,284	53.8	−0.1
Green	David Boughton	465	19.5	+13.1
Conservative	Martin Smith	427	17.9	−7.7
Conservative	Sarah Whitby	398	16.7	−5.8
Liberal Democrats	Audrey Stern	227	9.5	−2.5
Turnout		2,395	50.0	−2.1
Labour hold		Swing		
Labour hold		Swing		

=== 1986 election ===
The election took place on 8 May 1986.

1986 Haringey London Borough Council election: South Hornsey (2)
Party	Candidate	Votes	%	±%
Labour	Philip Jones	1,404	53.9	+8.0
Labour	Eddie Griffith	1,317	50.6	+8.5
Conservative	Ian Morrison	666	25.6	−7.3
Conservative	Christopher Stone	586	22.5	−9.4
Alliance (SDP)	Anne Manger	313	12.0	−3.0
Alliance (Liberal)	Valerie Silbiger	249	9.6	−5.3
Green	Verity Smith	166	6.4	N/A
Turnout		2,604	52.1	−0.1
Labour hold		Swing		
Labour hold		Swing		

=== 1982 election ===
The election took place on 6 May 1982.

1982 Haringey London Borough Council election: South Hornsey (2)
Party	Candidate	Votes	%	±%
Labour	Arthur Jones	1,031	45.9	−6.1
Labour	Colin Sherriff	944	42.1	−6.1
Conservative	Oliver Champion	738	32.9	−6.1
Conservative	Michael Morrison	716	31.9	−3.8
Alliance (SDP)	Anne Manger	336	15.0	+9.9
Alliance (SDP)	Jonathan Popper	334	14.9	N/A
Workers Revolutionary	David Clayton	38	1.7	N/A
Turnout		2,244	52.2	+12.2
Labour hold		Swing		
Labour hold		Swing		

=== 1978 election ===
The election took place on 4 May 1978, under new boundaries, and electing 2 councillors vice 3.

1978 Haringey London Borough Council election: South Hornsey (2)
Party	Candidate	Votes	%	±%
Labour	Arthur Jones	1,069	52.0	
Labour	Colin Sherriff	992	48.2	
Conservative	Gail Moss	802	39.0	
Conservative	Edward Webb	733	35.7	
Liberal	Antoinette Wattebot	104	5.1	
National Front	William Pell	68	3.3	
National Front	Derek Clinton	54	2.6	
Turnout		2,056	40.0	
Labour win (new boundaries)				
Labour win (new boundaries)				

=== 1974 election ===
The election took place on 2 May 1974.

1974 Haringey London Borough Council election: South Hornsey (3)
Party	Candidate	Votes	%	±%
Labour	J. B. Corbyn	1,190	50.6	−7.3
Labour	D. H. Billingsley	1,169	49.7	−6.9
Labour	F. Neuner	1,041	44.3	−11.3
Conservative	B. C. Greaves	879	37.4	+3.0
Conservative	P. R. Haselwood	838	35.6	+1.7
Conservative	C. Kavallares	824	35.0	+1.8
Liberal	D. A. Arnold	198	8.4	N/A
Communist	J. A. Luckett	116	4.9	+0.7
Turnout		2,352	34.3	−4.2
Labour hold		Swing		
Labour hold		Swing		
Labour hold		Swing		

=== 1971 election ===
The election took place on 13 May 1971.

1971 Haringey London Borough Council election: South Hornsey (3)
Party	Candidate	Votes	%	±%
Labour	L. H. Lipson	1,680	57.9	+22.8
Labour	U. M. Thompson	1,641	56.6	+22.5
Labour	F. Neuner	1,612	55.6	+22.0
Conservative	M. B. Gillman	998	34.4	−23.7
Conservative	S. M. Ayres	984	33.9	−23.6
Conservative	S. G. Parker	964	33.2	−24.9
National Front	G. G. Bedford	136	4.7	N/A
Communist	J. McLeod	123	4.2	−2.9
National Front	B. W. Pell	103	3.6	N/A
Turnout		2,900	38.5	+4.2
Labour gain from Conservative		Swing		
Labour gain from Conservative		Swing		
Labour gain from Conservative		Swing		

=== 1968 election ===
The election took place on 9 May 1968.

1968 Haringey London Borough Council election: South Hornsey (3)
Party	Candidate	Votes	%	±%
Conservative	C. J. H. Shepherd	1,602	58.1	+19.4
Conservative	E. A. W. Wilkins	1,602	58.1	+20.0
Conservative	S. M. Ayres	1,587	57.5	+20.9
Labour	L. H. Lipson	967	35.1	−20.3
Labour	N. E. S. McIntosh	940	34.1	−22.4
Labour	B. Murphy	927	33.6	−22.7
Communist	R. J. Condon	196	7.1	−0.5
Turnout		2,758	34.3	−1.6
Conservative gain from Labour		Swing		
Conservative gain from Labour		Swing		
Conservative gain from Labour		Swing		

=== 1964 election ===
The election took place on 7 May 1964.

1964 Haringey London Borough Council election: South Hornsey (3)
Party	Candidate	Votes	%	±%
Labour	N. E. S. McIntosh	1,876	56.5	
Labour	B. C. St. John-Murphy	1,871	56.3	
Labour	J. E. Thexton	1,840	55.4	
Conservative	W. E. Band	1,284	38.7	
Conservative	A. C. Biernacka	1,264	38.1	
Conservative	P. J. Kennett	1,216	36.6	
Communist	G. T. G. Jeffrey	254	7.6	
Turnout		3,321	35.9	
Labour win (new seat)				
Labour win (new seat)				
Labour win (new seat)				
