= South Tottenham (ward) =

- Electoral ward for the Haringey London Borough Council
- South Tottenham ward boundaries since 2022
- Borough: Haringey
- County: Greater London
- Population: 16,821 (2021) (Note: 2021 Census data reported for 2022 ward boundaries)
- Electorate: 9,789 (2022)
- Major settlements: Harringay
- Area: 1.287 square kilometres (0.497 sq mi)

Current electoral ward
- Number of members: 3
- Councillors: Anna Lawton; Makbule Gunes; Mark Grosskopf
- GSS code: E05013599

South Tottenham is an electoral ward in the London Borough of Haringey. The ward was originally created in 1965, revised in 1978 and abolished in 2002. It was created again in 2022. It returns councillors to Haringey London Borough Council.

== Councillors ==
Until its abolition at the 2002 revision of ward boundaries, the ward elected two councillors.

| Election | Councillor | Councillor |
|---|---|---|
| 1964 | S. A. Berkery Smith (Lab) | A. T. Protheroe (Lab) |
| 1968 | S. A. Berkery Smith (Lab) | A. T. Protheroe (Lab) |
| 1971 | S. A. Berkery Smith (Lab) | A. T. Protheroe (Lab) |
| 1973 by-election | S. A. Berkery Smith (Lab) | Aaron Weichselbaum (Lab) |
| 1974 | Michael Coney (Residents) | Jane Chapman (Lab) |
| 1978 | Aaron Weichselbaum (Lab) | Jane Chapman (Lab) |
| 1980 by-election | Andy Love (Lab) | Jane Chapman (Lab) |
| 1982 | Andy Love (Lab) | Michael Coney (Con) |
| 1986 | Harry Lister (Lab) | Viv Fenwick (Lab) |
| 1990 | Harry Lister (Lab) | Ian Willmore (Lab) |
| 1994 | Liz Singleton (Lab) | Ian Willmore (Lab) |
| 1996 by-election | Liz Singleton (Lab) | Michael Green (Lab) |
| 1998 | Azize Canver (Lab) | Michael Green (Lab) |
| 1999 by-election | Liz Singleton (Lab) | Iris Josiah (Lab) |

From its re-establishment at the 2022 revision of ward boundaries, the ward has elected 3 councillors.

| Election | Councillor | Councillor | Councillor |
|---|---|---|---|
| 2022 | Sheila Peacock (Lab) | Charles Adje (Lab) | Makbule Gunes (Lab) |
| 2023 by-election | Sheila Peacock (Lab) | Mark Grosskopf (Lab) | Makbule Gunes (Lab) |
| 2026 | Anna Lawton (Lab) | Mark Grosskopf (Lab) | Makbule Gunes (Lab) |

== Elections ==
=== 2026 ===
South Tottenham (3)
| Party | Candidate | Votes | % | ±% |
|---|---|---|---|---|
| Labour | Mark Grosskopf* | 1,569 | 47.2 | −20.2 |
| Labour | Makbule Gunes* | 1,468 | 44.2 | −22.0 |
| Labour | Anna Lawton** | 1,445 | 43.5 | −24.5 |
| Green | Aisha Dodwell | 1,185 | 35.6 | +18.6 |
| Green | Joss MacDonald | 1,123 | 33.8 | N/A |
| Green | Charlotte Pink | 1,107 | 33.3 | N/A |
| Conservative | Stephen Noble | 270 | 8.1 | −7.9 |
| Reform | Ian Sinclair | 235 | 7.1 | N/A |
| Conservative | Patricia Mindham | 229 | 6.9 | −8.4 |
| Conservative | Judith Okeno | 199 | 6.0 | −9.0 |
| Liberal Democrats | Suzanne Crossman | 199 | 6.0 | +0.1 |
| Liberal Democrats | Richard Marks | 139 | 4.2 | −1.4 |
| Liberal Democrats | Roger Mothersdale | 124 | 3.7 | −1.0 |
| Turnout | | 3,324 | 35.2 | +8.4 |
| Labour hold | | | | |
| Labour hold | | | | |
| Labour hold | | | | |

=== 2023 by-election ===
The by-election took place on 4 October 2023, following the resignation of Charles Adje.

2023 South Tottenham by-election
| Party | Candidate | Votes | % | ±% |
|---|---|---|---|---|
| Labour | Mark Grosskopf | 1,268 | 68.2 | |
| Conservative | Shloime Royde | 286 | 15.4 | |
| Green | Jonathan McKinley | 235 | 12.6 | |
| Liberal Democrats | David Schmitz | 71 | 3.8 | |
| Majority | | 982 | 52.8 | |
| Turnout | | 1,860 | | |
| Labour hold | | Swing | | |

=== 2022 election ===
The election took place on 5 May 2022.

2022 Haringey London Borough Council election: South Tottenham
| Party | Candidate | Votes | % | ±% |
|---|---|---|---|---|
| Labour | Sheila Peacock | 1,784 | 68.0 | |
| Labour | Charles Adje | 1,769 | 67.4 | |
| Labour | Makbule Gunes | 1,737 | 66.2 | |
| Green | Abigail Dodd | 446 | 17.0 | |
| Conservative | Shloime Royde | 421 | 16.0 | |
| Conservative | Daniel Lake | 402 | 15.3 | |
| Conservative | Massimo Rossini | 393 | 15.0 | |
| Liberal Democrats | Paul Conyers | 156 | 5.9 | |
| Liberal Democrats | Joan Lindeman | 148 | 5.6 | |
| Liberal Democrats | Gavin Rosenthal | 123 | 4.7 | |
| Turnout | | 2,624 | 26.81 | |
| Labour win (new seat) | | | | |
| Labour win (new seat) | | | | |
| Labour win (new seat) | | | | |
