= 1990 Haringey London Borough Council election =

Local elections in London, England

- 3 May 1990

All 59 seats up for election to Haringey London Borough Council 30 seats needed for a majority
- Registered: 149,649
- Turnout: 69,733, 46.60%

	First party	Second party
Party	Labour	Conservative
Seats before	42	16
Seats won	42	17
Seat change	Steady	▲1
Popular vote	78,871	61,371
Percentage	47.57%	37.02%
	Third party	Fourth party
Party	Liberal Democrats	Green
Seats before	1	0
Seats won	0	0
Seat change	▼1	Steady
Popular vote	12,461	10,730
Percentage	7.52%	6.47%
Council control before election
Labour
Council control after election
Labour

The 1990 Haringey Council election took place on 3 May 1990 to elect members of Haringey London Borough Council in London, England. The whole council was up for election and the Labour Party stayed in overall control of the council.

== Election result ==
Haringey local election result 1990
Party	Seats	Gains	Losses	Net gain/loss	Seats %	Votes %	Votes	+/−
Labour	42	5	5	Steady	71.19	47.57	78,871	
Conservative	17	5	4	▲1	28.81	37.02	61,371	
Liberal Democrats	0	0	1	▼1	0.00	7.52	12,461	
Green	0	0	0	Steady	0.00	6.47	10,730	
SDP	0	0	0	Steady	0.00	0.71	1,179	
Tenants and Residents Association	0	0	0	Steady	0.00	0.57	949	
Independent	0	0	0	Steady	0.00	0.14	234	
Total	59						165,795	

== Ward results ==
=== Alexandra ===
Alexandra (3)
Party	Candidate	Votes	%	±%
Labour	Catherine Craig	1,472	37.6	+3.4
Labour	David Coats	1,394	35.6	+2.5
Labour	Mary Neuner**	1,387	35.4	+3.4
Conservative	Susan Campion	1,330	34.0	+4.0
Conservative	Stephen Songaila	1,233	31.5	+1.9
Conservative	Alpha Kane	1,223	31.3	+2.4
Liberal Democrats	Deborah Aleksander	907	23.2	−7.0
Liberal Democrats	David Beacham	877	22.4	−6.6
Liberal Democrats	Elisabeth Webb	847	21.6	−6.6
Green	Jonathan Dobres	483	12.3	+5.6
Turnout		3,916	58.8	−0.3
Labour hold		Swing		
Labour hold		Swing		
Labour hold		Swing		

Mary Neuner was a sitting councillor for Crouch End ward.

=== Archway ===
Archway (2)
Party	Candidate	Votes	%	±%
Labour	Felicia Gavron*	1,072	41.7	+4.5
Conservative	Andrew Broadhurst	1,045	40.6	+5.5
Conservative	Helen Roche	1,036	40.3	+6.5
Labour	David Billingsley	896	34.8	+0.2
Green	Martin Girven	354	13.8	+7.9
Liberal Democrats	Roger Mothersdale	284	11.0	−10.2
SDP	David Sargeant	195	7.6	N/A
Turnout		2,577	52.2	−0.1
Labour hold		Swing		
Conservative hold		Swing		

=== Bowes Park ===
Bowes Park (3)
Party	Candidate	Votes	%	±%
Conservative	Juliet Donnelly	1,775	43.7	+7.8
Conservative	Terence Pope*	1,736	42.7	+7.1
Labour	Vic Butler	1,694	41.7	+2.2
Conservative	Peter Grosz	1,639	40.3	+4.7
Labour	Peter Daly	1,587	39.1	+1.2
Labour	Vaughan West	1,318	32.4	−2.7
Green	David Rumble	565	13.9	+10.0
Liberal Democrats	David Green	408	10.0	−8.3
Turnout		4,068	47.4	−4.7
Conservative hold		Swing		
Conservative gain from Labour		Swing		
Labour hold		Swing		

=== Bruce Grove ===
Bruce Grove (3)
Party	Candidate	Votes	%	±%
Labour	Seamus Carey	1,684	51.0	+7.3
Labour	Elsworth Marshall	1,682	51.0	+7.8
Labour	Stephen Brasher	1,623	49.2	+7.4
Tenants and Residents Association	Ann Musselwhite	949	28.8	N/A
Green	Donald Nicholls	703	21.3	+15.0
Conservative	Paul Walker	697	21.1	−5.5
Liberal Democrats	Jonathan Hobbs	372	11.3	−8.4
Turnout		3,313	40.7	−7.4
Labour hold		Swing		
Labour hold		Swing		
Labour hold		Swing		

=== Coleraine ===
Coleraine (3)
Party	Candidate	Votes	%	±%
Labour	Maureen Dewar*	1,809	48.0	+11.2
Labour	George Meehan	1,720	45.7	+9.4
Labour	Reginald Rice	1,708	45.4	+10.4
Liberal Democrats	Alex L'Estrange*	1,416	37.6	−0.8
Liberal Democrats	Philip Lewis	1,136	30.2	−2.2
Liberal Democrats	Elizabeth Mould	1,127	29.9	−2.2
Conservative	Annabel Kirk	587	15.6	−0.5
Green	David Burns	344	9.1	+6.6
Turnout		3,772	46.2	−5.9
Labour gain from Liberal Democrats		Swing		
Labour hold		Swing		
Labour hold		Swing		

=== Crouch End ===
Crouch End (3)
Party	Candidate	Votes	%	±%
Conservative	Ronald Aitken*	1,489	42.6	+9.7
Conservative	Caroline Elderfield	1,419	40.6	+9.0
Labour	Tim MacGregor	1,358	38.8	+3.9
Conservative	Edward Webb	1,353	38.7	+7.9
Labour	Frederick Neuner	1,266	36.2	+2.3
Labour	Max Morris	1,086	31.0	−2.5
Green	David Corran	526	15.0	+4.8
Green	Jeffrey Pirie	521	14.9	N/A
SDP	Penelope Aitken	277	7.9	N/A
Liberal Democrats	Kathleen Chestnutt	233	6.7	−15.4
SDP	Colin Croly	168	4.8	−17.4
Turnout		3,521	52.1	−3.7
Conservative gain from Labour		Swing		
Conservative gain from Labour		Swing		
Labour hold		Swing		

=== Fortis Green ===
Fortis Green (3)
Party	Candidate	Votes	%	±%
Conservative	Roger Dix*	1,716	49.2	+6.1
Conservative	Gerard Tyler*	1,696	48.6	+7.9
Conservative	Mary Poole-Wilson*	1,669	47.8	+4.7
Labour	Jean Waldman	1,163	33.3	+6.1
Labour	Peter Draper	1,142	32.7	+5.6
Labour	James Wignall	976	28.0	+1.0
Green	Peter Budge	619	17.7	+10.2
Liberal Democrats	Joyce Arram	352	10.1	−12.9
Liberal Democrats	Lore Fry	321	9.2	−13.2
Turnout		3,488	50.0	−2.2
Conservative hold		Swing		
Conservative hold		Swing		
Conservative hold		Swing		

=== Green Lanes ===
Green Lanes (2)
Party	Candidate	Votes	%	±%
Labour	Andreas Mikkides*	1,297	51.6	−5.3
Labour	Patrick Tonge*	1,144	45.5	−12.4
Conservative	Andreas Charalambous	843	33.5	+8.9
Conservative	Nityanand Ragnuth	780	31.0	+6.5
Green	Peter Corley	295	11.7	N/A
Liberal Democrats	Peter Davies	169	6.7	−3.8
Turnout		2,523	44.3	+1.1
Labour hold		Swing		
Labour hold		Swing		

=== Harringay ===
Harringay (3)
Party	Candidate	Votes	%	±%
Labour	Ronald Blanchard*	1,709	62.4	+7.7
Labour	Gina Adamides	1,622	59.2	+5.3
Labour	Chris Zissimos*	1,454	53.1	+3.7
Conservative	Sheila Cheetham	737	26.9	+6.1
Conservative	Kenneth Mansfield	713	26.0	+5.4
Conservative	Christine Sampson	685	25.0	+2.1
Green	Elizabeth Crosbie	510	18.6	+12.6
Liberal Democrats	Lily Roberts	236	8.6	−2.9
Turnout		2,749	36.8	−4.5
Labour hold		Swing		
Labour hold		Swing		
Labour hold		Swing		

=== High Cross ===
High Cross (2)
Party	Candidate	Votes	%	±%
Labour	Robert Harris*	1,084	53.8	+6.8
Labour	Errol Neckles	909	45.2	+0.6
Conservative	Gladys Brandon	599	29.8	+4.0
Conservative	Catherine McCarney	532	26.4	+3.4
Green	Hilary Jago	239	11.9	N/A
Liberal Democrats	Attila Borzak	181	9.0	−13.4
Turnout		2,018	40.1	−7.4
Labour hold		Swing		
Labour hold		Swing		

=== Highgate ===
Highgate (2)
Party	Candidate	Votes	%	±%
Conservative	Andrew Mitchell*	1,304	57.2	−1.0
Conservative	William Blackburne*	1,298	57.0	+0.8
Labour	Esme Chandler	574	25.2	+5.3
Labour	Harold Stedman	509	22.3	+5.1
Green	Rochelle Lewis	263	11.5	+6.8
Liberal Democrats	Ian Jardin	174	7.6	−10.2
SDP	Clare Croly	162	7.1	−10.1
Turnout		2,281	48.1	−0.8
Conservative hold		Swing		
Conservative hold		Swing		

=== Hornsey Central ===
Hornsey Central (2)
Party	Candidate	Votes	%	±%
Labour	Mark Cooke	1,216	45.9	+9.5
Labour	Toby Harris*	1,025	38.7	−0.8
Conservative	David Allen	944	35.6	+7.0
Conservative	Helen Jackson	916	34.6	+6.6
Green	David Lewis	462	17.4	+9.3
Liberal Democrats	John Phillips	267	10.1	−7.3
Turnout		2,656	52.6	−2.8
Labour hold		Swing		
Labour hold		Swing		

=== Hornsey Vale ===
Hornsey Vale (2)
Party	Candidate	Votes	%	±%
Labour	Josie Irwin	1,400	57.2	+5.8
Labour	Jobaidur Rahman	1,130	46.2	−3.8
Conservative	Peter Gilbert	641	26.2	−0.5
Conservative	Susan Harris	610	24.9	−0.6
Green	Paul Butler	468	19.1	+11.5
SDP	Jill Adler	158	6.5	N/A
Liberal Democrats	Mohsen Chadirchi	132	5.4	−6.2
Turnout		2,453	51.3	−1.3
Labour hold		Swing		
Labour hold		Swing		

=== Muswell Hill ===
Muswell Hill (3)
Party	Candidate	Votes	%	±%
Conservative	Benjamin Hall*	1,959	46.4	+5.3
Conservative	Blair Greaves*	1,939	45.9	+5.9
Conservative	Aeronwy Harris*	1,896	44.9	+5.4
Labour	Paul Farrelly	1,469	34.8	+4.1
Labour	Joanna Moore	1,437	34.0	+6.2
Labour	Nigel Willmott	1,355	32.1	+5.2
Green	Juliet Solomon	874	20.7	+10.4
Liberal Democrats	Roderick Benziger	405	9.6	−12.7
Liberal Democrats	Clive Silbiger	403	9.5	−12.1
Turnout		4,226	53.3	−1.1
Conservative hold		Swing		
Conservative hold		Swing		
Conservative hold		Swing		

=== Noel Park ===
Noel Park (3)
Party	Candidate	Votes	%	±%
Conservative	William Golden*	1,609	41.9	+5.4
Labour	Martyn Appadoo	1,608	41.9	+2.7
Labour	Alan Dobbie	1,597	41.6	+2.7
Conservative	Dennis Allin	1,536	40.0	+5.7
Labour	Narendra Makanji*	1,439	37.5	+0.8
Conservative	Ian Johnston	1,417	36.9	+3.0
Green	James Barty	415	10.8	+7.5
Liberal Democrats	Peter Jenner	294	7.7	−9.2
Independent	Michael Brosnan	234	6.1	N/A
Turnout		3,845	47.8	−5.5
Conservative gain from Labour		Swing		
Labour hold		Swing		
Labour hold		Swing		

=== Park ===
Park (2)
Party	Candidate	Votes	%	±%
Labour	Peter Clarke*	1,026	49.0	+5.6
Labour	Ray Dodds	1,022	48.8	+1.3
Conservative	Brian Boyle	677	32.3	−3.6
Conservative	Lorraine Noakes	589	28.1	−6.3
Green	Noel Lynch	243	11.6	N/A
Liberal Democrats	Alfred White	157	7.5	−5.0
Turnout		2,096	41.4	−3.5
Labour hold		Swing		
Labour hold		Swing		

=== Seven Sisters ===
Seven Sisters (2)
Party	Candidate	Votes	%	±%
Labour	Fred Knight*	1,308	65.0	+8.0
Labour	Cyril Robinson	1,150	57.2	+6.0
Conservative	James Cassins	472	23.5	−1.7
Conservative	John Kirk	406	20.2	−0.9
Green	Richard Warren	208	10.3	N/A
Liberal Democrats	Richard Howman	116	5.8	−7.5
Turnout		2,015	42.8	+1.5
Labour hold		Swing		
Labour hold		Swing		

=== South Hornsey ===
South Hornsey (2)
Party	Candidate	Votes	%	±%
Labour	Paul Williamson	1,455	60.9	+10.3
Labour	Arthur Jones*	1,284	53.8	−0.1
Green	David Boughton	465	19.5	+13.1
Conservative	Martin Smith	427	17.9	−7.7
Conservative	Sarah Whitby	398	16.7	−5.8
Liberal Democrats	Audrey Stern	227	9.5	−2.5
Turnout		2,395	50.0	−2.1
Labour hold		Swing		
Labour hold		Swing		

=== South Tottenham ===
South Tottenham (2)
Party	Candidate	Votes	%	±%
Labour	Harry Lister*	1,293	55.8	+7.6
Labour	Ian Willmore**	1,152	49.7	+2.4
Conservative	Barbara Armstrong	777	33.5	−2.0
Conservative	Michael Coney	757	32.7	−7.7
Green	Rupert Brandon	226	9.8	+6.3
Liberal Democrats	Anthony Barter	175	7.6	+0.7
Turnout		2,321	42.0	−9.3
Labour hold		Swing		
Labour hold		Swing		

Ian Willmore was a sitting councillor for the Bruce Grove ward.

=== Tottenham Central ===
Tottenham Central (3)
Party	Candidate	Votes	%	±%
Labour	Roger Harris*	2,031	64.0	+18.9
Labour	Mohammed Mehmet	1,662	52.4	+7.5
Labour	Aly Mir	1,621	51.1	+8.9
Conservative	Anthony Dignum	826	26.0	+2.2
Conservative	Patricia Mansfield	788	24.8	+2.0
Conservative	Sylvia Skipper	716	22.6	+3.8
Green	Christopher Mander	610	19.2	+14.9
Liberal Democrats	Philip Hawker	495	15.6	−7.4
Turnout		3,183	39.7	−6.9
Labour hold		Swing		
Labour hold		Swing		
Labour hold		Swing		

=== West Green ===
West Green (3)
Party	Candidate	Votes	%	±%
Labour	Eddie Griffith**	1,737	48.7	+7.0
Labour	Erline Prescott	1,631	45.7	+5.0
Labour	Alpha Turay	1,473	41.3	+1.6
Conservative	Ronald Bell*	1,366	38.3	−5.0
Conservative	Diane Harwood**	1,265	35.5	−6.2
Conservative	Jean Puttock	1,224	34.3	−6.2
Green	Claire Lewis	519	15.0	+10.3
Liberal Democrats	Jonathan Davies	298	8.4	−1.9
Turnout		3,575	44.0	−6.3
Labour gain from Conservative		Swing		
Labour hold		Swing		
Labour gain from Conservative		Swing		

Eddie Griffith was a sitting councillor for South Hornsey ward. Diane Harwood was a sitting councillor for White Hart Lane ward.

=== White Hart Lane ===
White Hart Lane (3)
Party	Candidate	Votes	%	±%
Labour	Christopher Berry	1,368	43.6	+9.8
Labour	Alfred Airende	1,329	42.3	+11.6
Conservative	Sheila Murphy	1,261	40.1	−7.5
Conservative	Donna Shirley*	1,188	37.8	−8.1
Conservative	Hugh McKinney	1,181	37.6	−8.8
Labour	Robert Shooter	1,175	37.4	+7.7
Green	Elizabeth Adams	353	11.2	N/A
Liberal Democrats	Frank Roberts	231	7.4	−6.2
Turnout		3,146	43.4	−8.3
Labour gain from Conservative		Swing		
Labour gain from Conservative		Swing		
Conservative hold		Swing		

=== Woodside ===
Woodside (3)
Party	Candidate	Votes	%	±%
Conservative	Jim Buckley*	1,609	44.9	+3.0
Labour	James Gardner*	1,503	41.9	+0.5
Conservative	Neil Rostron	1,430	39.9	+3.1
Labour	Sharon Lawrence**	1,419	39.6	−0.2
Conservative	Malcolm Glynn	1,413	39.4	+2.8
Labour	Jayanti Patel	1,392	38.8	+0.3
Green	Christopher Rourke	465	13.0	N/A
Liberal Democrats	Nicholas Aleksander	221	6.2	−2.3
SDP	Jane Greig	219	6.1	−6.6
Turnout		3,596	50.0	−5.1
Conservative hold		Swing		
Labour hold		Swing		
Conservative gain from Labour		Swing		

Sharon Lawrence was a sitting councillor for the Harringay ward.

== By-elections ==
Noel Park by-election, 6 December 1990
Party	Candidate	Votes	%	±%
Labour	Narendra Makanji	995	41.2	+3.7
Conservative	Alpha K. Kane	919	38.1	−3.8
Centre Party	William Golden*	305	12.6	−29.3
Green	Paul Butler	71	2.9	−7.9
Liberal Democrats	Peter J. Jenner	69	2.9	−4.8
Independent	Michael E. Brosnan	55	2.3	−3.8
Turnout			30.1	
Labour gain from Conservative		Swing		

The by-election was called following the resignation of Cllr William Golden.

Bowes Park by-election, 19 March 1992
Party	Candidate	Votes	%	±%
Labour	Vivienne H. Manheim	1,615	45.6	+6.5
Conservative	David A. Allen	1,571	44.4	+1.7
Liberal Democrats	David M. Beacham	356	10.1	+0.1
Turnout			43.8	
Labour gain from Conservative		Swing		

The by-election was called following the disqualification of Cllr Terence Pope.

Bowes Park by-election, 24 September 1992
Party	Candidate	Votes	%	±%
Conservative	Sylvia G. Skipper	1,141	49.1	+8.8
Labour	Simon K. Walton	1,043	44.9	+3.2
Liberal Democrats	David M. Beacham	107	4.6	−5.4
Green	David C. Rumble	34	1.5	−12.4
Turnout			28.6	
Conservative gain from Labour		Swing		

The by-election was called following the death of Cllr Vic Butler.

Green Lanes by-election, 24 September 1992
Party	Candidate	Votes	%	±%
Labour	Neil J. Cleeveley	655	47.9	−3.7
Conservative	Andrew L. Charalambous	597	43.6	+10.1
Green	Peter Budge	61	4.5	−7.2
Liberal Democrats	Samantha C. Bowring	55	4.0	−2.7
Turnout			26.2	
Labour hold		Swing		

The by-election was called following the resignation of Cllr Andreas Mikkides.

White Hart Lane by-election, 24 September 1992
Party	Candidate	Votes	%	±%
Conservative	Philip N. Murphie	896	47.7	+7.6
Labour	Simon Jennings	816	43.5	+6.1
Liberal Democrats	Jennifer L. Perkins	127	6.8	−0.6
Green	David H. Burns	39	2.1	−9.1
Turnout			27.6	
Conservative hold		Swing		

The by-election was called following the resignation of Cllr Sheila Murphy.

Highgate by-election, 14 October 1993
Party	Candidate	Votes	%	±%
Conservative	Pamela J. Steele	772	55.7	−1.3
Labour	Sheila Peacock	432	31.2	+6.0
Liberal Democrats	Roderick R. V. L. Benziger	181	13.1	+5.5
Turnout			30.1	
Conservative hold		Swing		

The by-election was called following the resignation of Cllr William Blackburne.
