= 1964 Haringey London Borough Council election =

The 1964 Haringey Council election took place on 7 May 1964 to elect members of Haringey London Borough Council in London, England. The whole council was up for election and the Labour party gained control of the council.

== Background ==
These elections were the first to the newly formed borough. Previously elections had taken place in the Municipal Borough of Hornsey, Municipal Borough of Tottenham and Municipal Borough of Wood Green. These boroughs were joined to form the new London Borough of Haringey by the London Government Act 1963.

A total of 158 candidates stood in the election for the 60 seats being contested across 20 wards. These included a full slate from the Conservative and Labour parties, while the Liberals stood 18 candidates. Other candidates included 20 from the Communist party. There were 14 three-seat wards, 3 four-seat wards and 3 two-seat wards.

This election had aldermen as well as directly elected councillors. Labour got all 10 aldermen.

The Council was elected in 1964 as a "shadow authority" but did not start operations until 1 April 1965.

== Election result ==
The results saw Labour gain the new council with a majority of 22 after winning 41 of the 60 seats. Overall turnout in the election was 33.4%. This turnout included 1,097 postal votes.

== Ward results ==
=== Alexandra-Bowes ===
Alexandra-Bowes (4)
Party	Candidate	Votes	%	±%
Conservative	A. C. Findley	2,673	55.5	
Conservative	Mrs. D. C. Findley	2,654	55.1	
Conservative	B. L. Greenway	2,603	54.0	
Conservative	V. N. Jary	2,599	53.9	
Labour	E. A. Brett	2,078	43.1	
Labour	F. C. Fowler	2,050	42.5	
Labour	S. Levene	1,976	41.0	
Labour	D. H. Billingsley	1,973	40.9	
Communist	Mrs. J. Green	229	4.8	
Turnout		4,820	38.8	
Conservative win (new seat)				
Conservative win (new seat)				
Conservative win (new seat)				
Conservative win (new seat)				

=== Bruce Grove ===
Bruce Grove (3)
Party	Candidate	Votes	%	±%
Labour	E. G. Large	1,796	60.6	
Labour	R. L. Singer	1,728	58.3	
Labour	L. Cohen	1,709	57.7	
Conservative	E. Manning	1,075	36.3	
Conservative	R. Perry	1,040	35.1	
Conservative	Sir R. Williams	1,036	35.0	
Communist	A. Higgins	205	6.9	
Turnout		2,964	31.8	
Labour win (new seat)				
Labour win (new seat)				
Labour win (new seat)				

=== Central Hornsey ===
Central Hornsey (3)
Party	Candidate	Votes	%	±%
Labour	B. D. Lipson	2,132	63.3	
Labour	C. W. Miller	2,106	62.4	
Labour	Mrs. M. E. Warbis	2,089	62.0	
Conservative	R. C. McGuire	1,200	35.6	
Conservative	T. W. Wilkins	1,163	34.5	
Conservative	D. P. Salinger	1,159	34.4	
Communist	D. J. O’Hanrahan	70	2.1	
Turnout		3,370	38.3	
Labour win (new seat)				
Labour win (new seat)				
Labour win (new seat)				

=== Coleraine ===
Coleraine (4)
Party	Candidate	Votes	%	±%
Labour	G. A. De Vote	2,334	65.0	
Labour	L. H. Collis	2,333	64.9	
Labour	E. V. Garwood	2,332	64.9	
Labour	R. H. Warren	2,301	64.1	
Conservative	E. C. Godfrey	830	23.1	
Conservative	P. Turner	805	22.4	
Conservative	S. Lewis	804	22.4	
Conservative	P. Stephenson	779	21.7	
Liberal	D. Goode	366	10.2	
Liberal	D. Fay	336	9.4	
Liberal	L. Jeal	227	6.3	
Communist	Mrs. J. Lincoln	107	3.0	
Turnout		3,592	29.4	
Labour win (new seat)				
Labour win (new seat)				
Labour win (new seat)				
Labour win (new seat)				

=== Crouch End ===
Crouch End (3)
Party	Candidate	Votes	%	±%
Conservative	B. D. Smith	2,071	50.6	
Conservative	L. Sussman	2,044	49.9	
Conservative	B. J. McBride	2,039	49.8	
Labour	D. J. W. Gardiner	1,577	38.5	
Labour	F. A. Rhodes	1,561	38.1	
Labour	J. E. Wehrfritz	1,551	37.9	
Liberal	Mrs. O. Parker	366	8.9	
Liberal	C. T. M. Anderson	336	8.2	
Liberal	A. J. Shutler	325	7.9	
Communist	Mrs. M. Morris	190	4.6	
Turnout		4,095	43.5	
Conservative win (new seat)				
Conservative win (new seat)				
Conservative win (new seat)				

=== Fortis Green ===
Fortis Green (3)
Party	Candidate	Votes	%	±%
Conservative	J. T. Wilkins	2,165	59.4	
Conservative	H. A. L. Rossi	2,143	58.8	
Conservative	L. A. Bains	2,141	58.7	
Labour	Miss J. P. Vincent	1,149	31.5	
Labour	D. W. Delderfield	1,137	31.2	
Labour	W. A. Tillson	1,133	31.1	
Liberal	P. C. Collins	285	7.8	
Liberal	R. N. Andrewes	282	7.7	
Liberal	J. A. Mandel	257	7.0	
Communist	S. Temple	114	3.1	
Turnout		3,647	43.1	
Conservative win (new seat)				
Conservative win (new seat)				
Conservative win (new seat)				

=== Green Lanes ===
Green Lanes (3)
Party	Candidate	Votes	%	±%
Labour	Mrs. M. E. Protheroe	1,378	58.3	
Labour	Mrs. K. E. Tillson	1,365	57.7	
Labour	A. J. R. Chaplin	1,322	55.9	
Conservative	P. R. Gardner	706	29.9	
Conservative	P. J. Wheal	693	29.3	
Conservative	J. J. Human	665	28.1	
Liberal	M. R. Gidley	233	9.9	
Liberal	L. S. Dyer	215	9.1	
Liberal	A. E. Hobbs	205	8.7	
Communist	H. S. Harman	103	4.4	
Turnout		2,364	25.7	
Labour win (new seat)				
Labour win (new seat)				
Labour win (new seat)				

=== High Cross ===
High Cross (2)
Party	Candidate	Votes	%	±%
Labour	Mrs. B. S. Remington	1,110	83.0	
Labour	J. D. McIlwain	1,055	78.8	
Conservative	G. Malin	196	14.6	
Conservative	R. Cook	189	14.1	
Communist	C. Wilson	44	3.3	
Turnout		1,338	24.0	
Labour win (new seat)				
Labour win (new seat)				

=== Highgate ===
Highgate (3)
Party	Candidate	Votes	%	±%
Conservative	P. P. Rigby	1,893	55.3	
Conservative	H. J. Worms	1,869	54.6	
Conservative	C. Murray	1,854	54.1	
Labour	J. F. Nicol	1,042	30.4	
Labour	Mrs. R. M. Pierce	1,040	30.4	
Labour	D. Dean	1,012	29.5	
Liberal	Mrs. D. C. M. Lambton	436	12.7	
Liberal	D. Stern	429	12.5	
Liberal	Viscountess Molesworth	419	12.2	
Communist	D. G. Parker	137	4.0	
Turnout		3,426	41.1	
Conservative win (new seat)				
Conservative win (new seat)				
Conservative win (new seat)				

=== Muswell Hill ===
Muswell Hill (3)
Party	Candidate	Votes	%	±%
Conservative	N. Muldoon	2,524	63.0	
Conservative	F. C. V. Hayward	2,502	62.4	
Conservative	F. P. Lloyd	2,498	62.3	
Labour	Mrs. G. F. Dimson	1,110	27.7	
Labour	R. J. M. Irons	1,074	26.8	
Labour	F. T. Skuddeer	1,025	25.6	
Liberal	D. R. Trafford	349	8.7	
Liberal	G. W. Martley	326	8.1	
Liberal	J. R. Salthouse	304	7.6	
Communist	Mrs. G. M. Jones	115	2.9	
Turnout		4,008	43.8	
Conservative win (new seat)				
Conservative win (new seat)				
Conservative win (new seat)				

=== Noel Park ===
Noel Park (4)
Party	Candidate	Votes	%	±%
Labour	R. G. Kendall	2,537	66.7	
Labour	C. D. Moss	2,502	65.8	
Labour	M. Skudder	2,501	65.7	
Labour	Mrs. L. A. Angell	2,497	65.6	
Conservative	Mrs. V. D. Habgood	1,187	31.2	
Conservative	Mrs. J. M. Hepburn	1,179	31.0	
Conservative	Mrs. M. E. Human	1,148	30.2	
Conservative	Mrs. E. M. Smith	1,106	29.1	
Communist	Mrs. E. L. Ramsey	217	5.7	
Turnout		3,805	31.1	
Labour win (new seat)				
Labour win (new seat)				
Labour win (new seat)				
Labour win (new seat)				

=== Park ===
Park (3)
Party	Candidate	Votes	%	±%
Labour	V. Butler	2,215	81.3	
Labour	R. G. Wigley	2,135	78.3	
Labour	R. A. Penton	2,128	78.1	
Conservative	Mrs. E. Sutton	433	15.9	
Conservative	H. A. Neville	418	15.3	
Conservative	K. Barker	416	15.3	
Communist	J. Hiles	169	6.2	
Turnout		2,725	27.1	
Labour win (new seat)				
Labour win (new seat)				
Labour win (new seat)				

=== Seven Sisters ===
Seven Sisters (3)
Party	Candidate	Votes	%	±%
Labour	F. A. Knight	1,294	76.6	
Labour	Mrs. D. Cunningham	1,249	73.9	
Labour	R. Parker	1,237	73.2	
Conservative	Mrs. M. Oxley	354	20.9	
Conservative	G. Ives	349	20.7	
Conservative	Miss L. Barnet	312	18.5	
Communist	M. Alter	82	4.9	
Turnout		1,690	21.7	
Labour win (new seat)				
Labour win (new seat)				
Labour win (new seat)				

=== South Hornsey ===
South Hornsey (3)
Party	Candidate	Votes	%	±%
Labour	Mrs. N. E. S. McIntosh	1,876	56.5	
Labour	B. C. St. John-Murphy	1,871	56.3	
Labour	Mrs. J. E. Thexton	1,840	55.4	
Conservative	W. E. Band	1,284	38.7	
Conservative	Miss A. C. Biernacka	1,264	38.1	
Conservative	P. J. Kennett	1,216	36.6	
Communist	G. T. G. Jeffrey	254	7.6	
Turnout		3,321	35.9	
Labour win (new seat)				
Labour win (new seat)				
Labour win (new seat)				

=== South Tottenham ===
South Tottenham (2)
Party	Candidate	Votes	%	±%
Labour	Mrs. S. A. Berkery Smith	1,203	79.0	
Labour	A. T. Protheroe	1,157	76.0	
Conservative	E. Burton	273	17.9	
Conservative	Mrs. N. Hulbert	266	17.5	
Communist	Mrs. B. Baker	56	3.7	
Turnout		1,523	23.5	
Labour win (new seat)				
Labour win (new seat)				

=== Stroud Green ===
Stroud Green (3)
Party	Candidate	Votes	%	±%
Conservative	J. Lotery	1,943	56.6	
Conservative	C. Hannington	1,941	56.5	
Conservative	G. H. Stansall	1,926	56.1	
Labour	Mrs. G. M. Dain	1,421	41.4	
Labour	Miss M. E. West	1,412	41.1	
Labour	T. R. O’Sullivan	1,378	40.1	
Communist	Mrs. S. D. O’Hanrahan	157	4.6	
Turnout		3,435	39.2	
Conservative win (new seat)				
Conservative win (new seat)				
Conservative win (new seat)				

=== Tottenham Central ===
Tottenham Central (3)
Party	Candidate	Votes	%	±%
Labour	E. A. Remington	1,280	76.1	
Labour	M. L. Norris	1,231	73.1	
Labour	R. W. H. Ford	1,157	68.7	
Conservative	Miss S. Hogg	361	21.4	
Conservative	W. Donno	321	19.1	
Conservative	Miss V. Ives	317	18.8	
Communist	D. Wheeler	94	5.6	
Turnout		1,683	20.1	
Labour win (new seat)				
Labour win (new seat)				
Labour win (new seat)				

=== Town Hall ===
Town Hall (3)
Party	Candidate	Votes	%	±%
Labour	L. A. Vitoria	1,660	54.3	
Labour	E. V. Page	1,632	53.4	
Labour	Mrs. P. M. Dines	1,627	53.2	
Conservative	R. Habgood	1,339	43.8	
Conservative	A. E. Roy	1,326	43.4	
Conservative	M. Jay	1,297	42.4	
Communist	T. Ainley	110	3.6	
Turnout		3,056	36.1	
Labour win (new seat)				
Labour win (new seat)				
Labour win (new seat)				

=== Turnpike ===
Turnpike (2)
Party	Candidate	Votes	%	±%
Labour	A. R. McIntosh	1,123	54.9	
Labour	C. J. Ettinger	1,115	54.5	
Conservative	N. H. King	824	40.3	
Conservative	J. A. R. Thorogood	786	38.5	
Communist	P. J. Ackerman	99	4.8	
Turnout		2,044	33.3	
Labour win (new seat)				
Labour win (new seat)				

=== West Green ===
West Green (3)
Party	Candidate	Votes	%	±%
Labour	D. Clark	1,509	52.3	
Labour	D. J. Ding	1,450	50.3	
Labour	Mrs. L. H. Lipson	1,421	49.3	
Conservative	A. W. Catley	1,356	47.0	
Conservative	H. A. H. Jeffries	1,314	45.6	
Conservative	H. E. Spratt	1,304	45.2	
Communist	Mrs. P. A. Wheeler	60	2.1	
Turnout		2,884	33.4	
Labour win (new seat)				
Labour win (new seat)				
Labour win (new seat)				
