= 1978 Haringey London Borough Council election =

The 1978 Haringey Council election took place on 4 May 1978 to elect members of Haringey London Borough Council in London, England. The whole council was up for election and the Labour party stayed in overall control of the council.

== Ward results ==
=== Alexandra ===
Alexandra (3)
Party	Candidate	Votes	%	±%
Conservative	Timothy Allen*	1,668	46.8	
Conservative	Stephen Gaubert*	1,624	45.6	
Conservative	Victor Jary*	1,618	45.4	
Labour	Peter Conoboy	1,259	35.3	
Labour	Elizabeth Simons	1,221	34.3	
Labour	Philip Lewis	1,182	33.2	
Liberal	Hugh Clarke	490	13.8	
Liberal	Jonathan Pope	437	12.3	
Liberal	Clive World	413	11.6	
National Front	Frank Bennett	90	2.5	
National Front	Barry Hunt	74	2.1	
National Front	Maureen Kerby	71	2.0	
Turnout		3,563	45.6	
Conservative win (new seat)				
Conservative win (new seat)				
Conservative win (new seat)				

=== Archway ===
Archway (2)
Party	Candidate	Votes	%	±%
Conservative	Sarah Whitby*	1,186	48.5	
Conservative	Antony Franchi	1,179	48.3	
Labour	Willisford Pilgrim	989	40.5	
Labour	David Barlow*	954	39.1	
Liberal	Hope Malik	197	8.1	
National Front	Hilda Giddings	34	1.4	
National Front	Paul Vanderstay	27	1.1	
Turnout		2,443	45.0	
Conservative win (new seat)				
Conservative win (new seat)				

=== Bowes Park ===
Bowes Park (3)
Party	Candidate	Votes	%	±%
Labour	James Gardner	1,750	44.9	
Labour	Kevin Hargreaves	1,724	44.2	
Labour	Frederick Neuner*	1,649	42.3	
Conservative	Peter Tuck	1,622	41.6	
Conservative	Reginald Chester	1,616	41.4	
Conservative	Brian Salinger	1,586	40.7	
Liberal	Elizabeth World	250	6.4	
Liberal	Anthony Zotti	197	5.1	
National Front	Stephen Andrews	181	4.6	
National Front	Colin Mates	178	4.6	
National Front	Terence Stephenson	166	4.3	
Turnout		3,900	43.6	
Labour win (new seat)				
Labour win (new seat)				
Labour win (new seat)				

=== Bruce Grove ===
Bruce Grove (3)
Party	Candidate	Votes	%	±%
Labour	Bernie Grant	1,757	60.3	
Labour	Donald Billingsley*	1,666	57.2	
Labour	Elizabeth Newton	1,643	56.4	
Conservative	Russell McGuiness	837	28.7	
Conservative	Lebert Powell	790	27.1	
Conservative	George Ryan	756	26.0	
National Front	Richard Hurn	176	6.0	
National Front	Gordon Ross	145	5.0	
National Front	William Wimbleton	109	3.7	
Turnout		2,913	34.6	
Labour win (new seat)				
Labour win (new seat)				
Labour win (new seat)				

=== Coleraine ===
Coleraine (3)
Party	Candidate	Votes	%	±%
Labour	Eric Garwood*	1,563	48.9	
Labour	Joan Smith*	1,363	42.7	
Labour	Gerald Long	1,351	42.3	
Conservative	Barbara Bleach	783	24.5	
Conservative	Alan Bowring	771	24.1	
Conservative	Peter Gilbert	751	23.5	
North East Tottenham Campaign Against Traffic	Denis Hawes	620	19.4	
North East Tottenham Campaign Against Traffic	Margaret Matthews	526	16.5	
North East Tottenham Campaign Against Traffic	John Wratten	506	15.8	
National Front	Phillip Walker	170	5.3	
National Front	Barry Eglington	161	5.0	
National Front	Vicky Plummer	151	4.7	
Turnout		3,194	39.5	
Labour win (new seat)				
Labour win (new seat)				
Labour win (new seat)				

=== Crouch End ===
Crouch End (3)
Party	Candidate	Votes	%	±%
Conservative	Brian Smith*	1,490	49.4	
Conservative	Stephen Ayres	1,472	48.8	
Conservative	Basil Lewis*	1,451	48.1	
Labour	Melinda Phillips	1,171	38.9	
Labour	Stephen Hull	1,126	37.4	
Labour	Geoffrey Rowan-Robinson	1,104	36.6	
Liberal	Patrick O'Brien	321	10.7	
National Front	Vincent Sumner	84	2.8	
National Front	Christopher Walford	73	2.4	
National Front	Leslie Waters	67	2.2	
Turnout		3,014	41.4	
Conservative win (new seat)				
Conservative win (new seat)				
Conservative win (new seat)				

=== Fortis Green ===
Fortis Green (3)
Party	Candidate	Votes	%	±%
Conservative	Christopher Hannington*	1,992	55.1	
Conservative	Jean MacGregor*	1,983	54.9	
Conservative	Jeffrey Lotery*	1,981	54.8	
Labour	Patricia Pearl	1,215	33.6	
Labour	George Simpson	1,210	33.5	
Labour	Kevin Twaite	1,101	30.5	
Liberal	John Wildsmith	248	6.9	
National Front	Thomas Joyce	95	2.6	
National Front	Bernard Potter	62	1.7	
National Front	June Squire	57	1.6	
Turnout		3,612	46.3	
Conservative win (new seat)				
Conservative win (new seat)				
Conservative win (new seat)				

=== Green Lanes ===
Green Lanes (2)
Party	Candidate	Votes	%	±%
Labour	George Greenacre	1,336	61.5	
Labour	George Meehan	1,304	60.0	
Conservative	Gilbert Benton	576	26.5	
Conservative	Leonard Cohen	554	25.5	
Liberal	Katherine Alexander	129	5.9	
National Front	Alan Middleton	104	4.8	
Liberal	Martin Silverston	98	4.5	
National Front	Janice Middleton	78	3.6	
Turnout		2,174	36.7	
Labour win (new seat)				
Labour win (new seat)				

=== Harringay ===
Harringay (3)
Party	Candidate	Votes	%	±%
Labour	Charles Silverstone*	1,776	54.7	
Labour	Jeremy Corbyn*	1,729	53.2	
Labour	Ronald Blanchard	1,651	50.8	
Conservative	Timothy Easton	1,064	32.8	
Conservative	Gerald Murphy*	1,056	32.5	
Conservative	Christakis Kavallares	1,048	32.3	
Communist	Francis Carr	231	7.1	
National Front	Leslie Butler	112	3.4	
National Front	John Green	86	2.6	
National Front	Barbara Green	78	2.4	
Turnout		3,247	39.9	
Labour win (new seat)				
Labour win (new seat)				
Labour win (new seat)				

=== High Cross ===
High Cross (2)
Party	Candidate	Votes	%	±%
Labour	Anthony McBrearty*	835	51.1	
Labour	Robin Young*	747	45.7	
Conservative	Sylvia Currie	349	21.4	
North East Tottenham Campaign Against Traffic	Alexander L'Estrange	328	20.1	
North East Tottenham Campaign Against Traffic	Brenda Keech	292	17.9	
National Front	David Tedder	111	6.8	
National Front	Monica Pearson	104	6.4	
National Association for the Advancement of Coloured People	Clinton Hamilton	37	2.3	
Turnout		1,634	40.2	
Labour win (new seat)				
Labour win (new seat)				

=== Highgate ===
Highgate (2)
Party	Candidate	Votes	%	±%
Conservative	Anthony Dignum*	1,608	69.7	
Conservative	Gail Ansell	1,572	68.1	
Labour	Allan Barclay	552	23.9	
Labour	Barbara Simon	552	23.9	
National Front	George Embury	27	1.2	
National Front	Augustus Spencer	21	0.9	
Turnout		2,307	43.4	
Conservative win (new seat)				
Conservative win (new seat)				

=== Hornsey Central ===
Hornsey Central (2)
Party	Candidate	Votes	%	±%
Labour	Brian Bullard*	1,407	51.1	
Labour	Toby Harris	1,268	46.0	
Conservative	Richard Bull	1,091	39.6	
Conservative	Yvonne Owen	1,019	37.0	
Liberal	Andrew Johnson	122	4.4	
National Front	Robin May	102	3.7	
National Front	Sylvia May	93	3.4	
Turnout		2,754	50.3	
Labour win (new seat)				
Labour win (new seat)				

=== Hornsey Vale ===
Hornsey Vale (2)
Party	Candidate	Votes	%	±%
Labour	Michael Killingworth	1,049	49.4	
Labour	John Whysall	931	43.9	
Conservative	Gillian Bull	760	35.8	
Conservative	Blair Greaves	729	34.4	
Liberal	Dudley Racher	207	9.8	
Liberal	Christine Saunders	157	7.4	
National Front	Isobel Hunt	51	2.4	
National Front	Kenneth Hunt	47	2.2	
Turnout		2,122	41.0	
Labour win (new seat)				
Labour win (new seat)				

=== Muswell Hill ===
Muswell Hill (3)
Party	Candidate	Votes	%	±%
Conservative	Benjamin Hall*	2,254	58.5	
Conservative	Aeronwy Harris*	2,142	55.5	
Conservative	Christine Jackson*	2,121	55.0	
Labour	Elizabeth Murphy	1,293	33.5	
Labour	Nora Dain	1,280	33.2	
Labour	Katherine Patrick*	1,227	31.8	
Liberal	Francis Coleman	324	8.4	
National Front	Denise Draper	81	2.1	
National Front	Keith Draper	75	1.9	
National Front	Ellen Binick	66	1.7	
Turnout		3,856	45.1	
Conservative win (new seat)				
Conservative win (new seat)				
Conservative win (new seat)				

=== Noel Park ===
Noel Park (3)
Party	Candidate	Votes	%	±%
Labour	Terence O'Sullivan*	1,806	49.1	
Labour	Edward Young*	1,780	48.4	
Labour	Susan Scales	1,776	48.3	
Conservative	John Heron	1,399	38.0	
Conservative	Paul Hitchens	1,326	36.1	
Conservative	Ralph Eschwege	1,307	35.5	
National Front	Keith Squire	240	6.5	
National Front	Paul Joyce	186	5.1	
National Front	Kathleen Lines	158	4.3	
Liberal	Rosemary Clarke	126	3.4	
Turnout		3,678	44.8	
Labour win (new seat)				
Labour win (new seat)				
Labour win (new seat)				

=== Park ===
Park (2)
Party	Candidate	Votes	%	±%
Labour	Eileen Garwood*	1,122	50.2	
Labour	Nicole Harrison	1,014	45.4	
Conservative	Anne Allen	725	32.5	
Conservative	Derek Webb	647	29.0	
North East Tottenham Campaign Against Traffic	Robert Hart	177	7.9	
North East Tottenham Campaign Against Traffic	Marie Cullen	176	7.9	
National Front	John Burkitt	140	6.3	
National Front	Steven Davey	135	6.0	
Save London Alliance	Heather Beyer	32	1.4	
Turnout		2,233	42.3	
Labour win (new seat)				
Labour win (new seat)				

=== Seven Sisters ===
Seven Sisters (2)
Party	Candidate	Votes	%	±%
Labour	Frederick Knight*	992	60.9	
Labour	Leslie Collis*	848	52.1	
Conservative	Sheila Reed	472	29.0	
Conservative	John Tattersall	422	25.9	
National Front	Kenneth Giddings	118	7.2	
National Front	Bridget Giddings	114	7.0	
Turnout		1,628	35.7	
Labour win (new seat)				
Labour win (new seat)				

=== South Hornsey ===
South Hornsey (2)
Party	Candidate	Votes	%	±%
Labour	Arthur Jones	1,069	52.0	
Labour	Colin Sherriff	992	48.2	
Conservative	Gail Moss	802	39.0	
Conservative	Edward Webb	733	35.7	
Liberal	Antoinette Wattebot	104	5.1	
National Front	William Pell	68	3.3	
National Front	Derek Clinton	54	2.6	
Turnout		2,056	40.0	
Labour win (new seat)				
Labour win (new seat)				

=== South Tottenham ===
South Tottenham (2)
Party	Candidate	Votes	%	±%
Labour	Jane Chapman*	1,258	50.7	
Labour	Aaron Weichselbaum	1,172	47.2	
South Tottenham Residents and Ratepayers	Michael Coney*	896	36.1	
South Tottenham Residents and Ratepayers	Ian Coward	647	26.1	
Conservative	Raj Rampal	350	14.1	
National Front	Frederick Mitchell	74	3.0	
National Front	Joan Mitchell	61	2.5	
National Association for the Advancement of Coloured Peoples	Haroon Mohammed	53	2.1	
Turnout		2,482	47.0	
Labour win (new seat)				
Labour win (new seat)				

=== Tottenham Central ===
Tottenham Central (3)
Party	Candidate	Votes	%	±%
Labour	Ron Turner*	1,733	64.0	
Labour	Angela Greatley	1,632	60.3	
Labour	Iris Woodger	1,585	58.5	
Conservative	Dennis Beale	589	21.8	
Conservative	Ethel Donno	557	20.6	
Conservative	Annabel Linney	541	20.0	
National Front	Sandra McKenzie	208	7.7	
National Front	Harry Baker	188	6.9	
National Front	Kenneth Newmarch	181	6.7	
Liberal	Paul Loizou	125	4.6	
Workers Revolutionary	Eric Gutteridge	69	2.5	
Turnout		2,708	35.3	
Labour win (new seat)				
Labour win (new seat)				
Labour win (new seat)				

=== West Green ===
West Green (3)
Party	Candidate	Votes	%	±%
Labour	Glenys Atkinson*	1,778	51.9	
Labour	Douglas Clark*	1,654	48.3	
Labour	Stephen Whittle*	1,553	45.3	
Conservative	John Carrington	1,285	37.5	
Conservative	Walter Donno	1,230	35.9	
Conservative	Sydney Oldham	1,184	34.5	
National Front	David Hutchinson	202	5.9	
National Front	Frederick Cumber	200	5.8	
National Front	Lucy Cumber	178	5.2	
Communist	Terence Heath	146	4.3	
Turnout		3,427	38.9	
Labour win (new seat)				
Labour win (new seat)				
Labour win (new seat)				

=== White Hart Lane ===
White Hart Lane (3)
Party	Candidate	Votes	%	±%
Labour	Victor Butler*	1,676	53.2	
Labour	Maureen Dewar*	1,410	44.7	
Labour	Collin Ware*	1,370	43.5	
Conservative	Bert Baker	1,092	34.6	
Conservative	Charles Franklin	1,017	32.3	
Conservative	Ronald Hoskins	1,009	32.0	
National Front	Robert Frost	299	9.5	
National Front	Wilfred Cleaves	276	8.8	
National Front	Bruce Pell	269	8.5	
Turnout		3,153	40.3	
Labour win (new seat)				
Labour win (new seat)				
Labour win (new seat)				

=== Woodside ===
Woodside (3)
Party	Candidate	Votes	%	±%
Labour	David Billingsley	1,475	44.3	
Conservative	Edward Auger	1,457	43.8	
Labour	Jacqueline Goodwin	1,439	43.3	
Conservative	Bernard Dehnel	1,425	42.8	
Conservative	Walter Taylor	1,395	41.9	
Labour	Harold Stedman	1,373	41.3	
National Front	Thomas Barnes	183	5.5	
National Front	Paul White	172	5.2	
National Front	Kenneth Hill	163	4.9	
Liberal	Audrey Hosein	96	2.9	
Turnout		3,327	44.0	
Labour win (new seat)				
Conservative win (new seat)				
Labour win (new seat)				

== By-elections ==
Woodside by-election, 15 March 1979
Party	Candidate	Votes	%	±%
Conservative	Bernard Dehnel	1,588	59.0	+16.2
Labour	John Warren	1,010	37.5	−5.8
Liberal	Antony Zotti	95	3.5	+0.6
Turnout			35.0	
Conservative gain from Labour		Swing		

The by-election was called following the resignation of Cllr Jacqueline Goodwin.

Coleraine by-election, 21 February 1980
Party	Candidate	Votes	%	±%
Labour	John Elkington	1,549	60.7	+11.8
Conservative	Christopher Palmer	895	35.1	+10.6
National Front	Robert Frost	106	4.2	−1.1
Turnout			32.0	
Labour hold		Swing		

The by-election was called following the resignation of Cllr Eric Garwood.

Seven Sisters by-election, 21 February 1980
Party	Candidate	Votes	%	±%
Labour	Paul Loach	1,020	72.3	+20.2
Conservative	Michael Coney	305	21.6	−7.4
Liberal	Hugo Reading	58	4.1	N/A
National Front	Colin Mates	27	1.9	−5.3
Turnout			31.3	
Labour hold		Swing		

The by-election was called following the resignation of Cllr Leslie Collis.

Alexandra by-election, 25 September 1980
Party	Candidate	Votes	%	±%
Conservative	Ralph Cleasby	1,148	41.1	−5.7
Labour	Elizabeth Simons	989	35.4	+1.1
Liberal	Clive World	655	23.5	+11.9
Turnout			36.9	
Conservative hold		Swing		

The by-election was called following the resignation of Cllr Timothy Allen.

South Tottenham by-election, 9 October 1980
Party	Candidate	Votes	%	±%
Labour	Andy Love	1,046	50.9	+3.7
Conservative	Michael Coney	1,009	49.1	+13.0
Turnout			38.3	
Labour hold		Swing		

The by-election was called following the resignation of Cllr Aaron Weichselbaum.

Coleraine by-election, 20 November 1980
Party	Candidate	Votes	%	±%
Labour	Anthony Rigby	1,441	56.3	+7.4
Conservative	Leonard Jackson	812	31.7	+7.2
Liberal	Alexander L'Estrange	305	11.9	N/A
Turnout			32.2	
Labour hold		Swing		

The by-election was called following the resignation of Cllr John Elkington.

Hornsey Vale by-election, 2 July 1981
Party	Candidate	Votes	%	±%
Labour	Vivienne Fenwick	826	47.4	−2.0
Conservative	Peter Gilbert	497	28.5	−7.3
Alliance	Richard Kennard	418	24.0	+14.2
Turnout			35.9	
Labour hold		Swing		

The by-election was called following the resignation of Cllr Michael Killingworth.
