= 1971 Haringey London Borough Council election =

The 1971 Haringey Council election took place on 13 May 1971 to elect members of Haringey London Borough Council in London, England. The whole council was up for election and the Labour Party gained overall control of the council.

== Election result ==
Haringey local election result 1971
Party	Seats	Gains	Losses	Net gain/loss	Seats %	Votes %	Votes	+/−
Labour	41	34	0	+34				
Conservative	19	0	34	-34				
Liberal	0	0	0	±0				
Communist	0	0	0	±0				
National Front	0	0	0	±0				
Socialist (GB)	0	0	0	±0				
Independent	0	0	0	±0				

== Ward results ==
=== Alexandra-Bowes ===
Alexandra-Bowes (4)
Party	Candidate	Votes	%	±%
Conservative	V. N. Jary*	2,609	52.5	−20.7
Conservative	S. R. Gaubert**	2,591	52.2	−20.3
Conservative	E. W. Rayner*	2,573	51.8	−20.6
Conservative	Mrs M. O. Moutrie*	2,566	51.7	−21.0
Labour	T. P. Fenton	2,287	46.0	+21.3
Labour	Mrs A. M. K. Avery	2,263	45.6	+21.1
Labour	Miss B. Shanley	2,241	45.1	+20.7
Labour	J. S. C. Robertson	2,236	45.0	+21.2
Turnout		4,968	38.5	−0.8
Conservative hold		Swing		
Conservative hold		Swing		
Conservative hold		Swing		
Conservative hold		Swing		

S. R. Gaubert was a sitting councillor for Noel Park ward.

=== Bruce Grove ===
Bruce Grove (3)
Party	Candidate	Votes	%	±%
Labour	E. M. Smith	2,138	68.4	+33.0
Labour	Mrs J. M. Smith	2,106	67.3	+29.9
Labour	R. A. R. Young	2,087	66.7	+30.6
Conservative	P. E. Hitchens*	923	29.5	−23.8
Conservative	J. A. Croft*	919	29.4	−29.2
Conservative	D. Beale*	915	29.3	−29.0
Turnout		3,128	35.6	+4.6
Labour gain from Conservative		Swing		
Labour gain from Conservative		Swing		
Labour gain from Conservative		Swing		

=== Central Hornsey ===
Central Hornsey (3)
Party	Candidate	Votes	%	±%
Labour	N. A. Cameron	1,911	59.7	+24.2
Labour	B. D. Lipson	1,888	59.0	+24.0
Labour	J. E. Wehrfritz	1,816	56.7	+22.5
Conservative	R. J. Atkins*	1,000	31.2	−29.6
Conservative	G. C. Cleaver**	984	30.7	−30.2
Conservative	R. H. Shafran	958	29.9	−27.9
Liberal	C. J. Fox	174	5.4	N/A
Liberal	Mrs O. Parker	167	5.2	N/A
Liberal	C. E. Spendiff	155	4.8	N/A
National Front	H. C. Lord	114	3.6	N/A
Turnout		3,202	45.9	+6.7
Labour gain from Conservative		Swing		
Labour gain from Conservative		Swing		
Labour gain from Conservative		Swing		

G. C. Cleaver was a sitting councillor for Coleraine ward.

=== Coleraine ===
Coleraine (4)
Party	Candidate	Votes	%	±%
Labour	E. V. Garwood*	3,351	73.4	+28.1
Labour	M. Dempsey	3,288	72.0	+27.0
Labour	Mrs M. F. Dewar	3,287	72.0	+29.7
Labour	D. Page	3,251	71.2	+29.1
Conservative	W. R. W. Taylor	1,098	24.0	−27.0
Conservative	J. L. Carrington	1,086	23.8	−26.2
Conservative	I. D. Crowther	1,060	23.2	−24.9
Conservative	W. E. Band	1,015	22.2	−24.8
Turnout		4,566	40.0	+9.4
Labour gain from Conservative		Swing		
Labour gain from Conservative		Swing		
Labour gain from Conservative		Swing		
Labour gain from Conservative		Swing		

=== Crouch End ===
Crouch End (3)
Party	Candidate	Votes	%	±%
Conservative	B. D. Smith*	1,847	52.0	−23.7
Conservative	B. G. Falk*	1,845	51.9	−24.6
Conservative	Miss S. A. Jones*	1,824	51.3	−23.7
Labour	G. Simpson	1,469	41.3	+20.6
Labour	S. Stander	1,450	40.8	+22.2
Labour	L. Redhead	1,438	40.5	+22.0
Liberal	J. S. F. Parker	233	6.6	N/A
Liberal	J. Budd	224	6.3	N/A
Liberal	A. Warren	216	6.1	N/A
Turnout		3,553	37.9	−0.5
Conservative hold		Swing		
Conservative hold		Swing		
Conservative hold		Swing		

=== Fortis Green ===
Fortis Green (3)
Party	Candidate	Votes	%	±%
Conservative	Mrs C. J. Levinson**	2,082	61.8	−14.8
Conservative	C. Hannington*	2,069	61.4	−14.2
Conservative	G. J. Y. Murphy**	2,053	60.9	−14.2
Labour	H. W. Hailey	1,123	33.3	+13.6
Labour	E. C. Penning-Rowsell	1,075	31.9	+12.7
Labour	S. R. Thompstone	1,072	31.8	+13.2
Communist	E. Cohen	217	6.4	+0.7
Turnout		3,369	38.4	−4.5
Conservative hold		Swing		
Conservative hold		Swing		
Conservative hold		Swing		

Mrs C. J. Levinson was a sitting councillor for Central Hornsey ward. G. J. Y. Murphy was a sitting councillor for Turnpike ward.

=== Green Lanes ===
Green Lanes (3)
Party	Candidate	Votes	%	±%
Labour	G. E. Greenacre	1,709	68.5	+27.6
Labour	A. G. Hudson	1,703	68.2	+30.8
Labour	G. F. Meehan	1,692	67.8	+30.9
Conservative	J. J. Human*	753	30.2	−28.6
Conservative	P. D. Tuck*	713	28.6	−26.7
Conservative	L. J. Farthing	710	28.4	−29.0
Turnout		2,496	31.9	+6.2
Labour gain from Conservative		Swing		
Labour gain from Conservative		Swing		
Labour gain from Conservative		Swing		

=== High Cross ===
High Cross (2)
Party	Candidate	Votes	%	±%
Labour	Mrs B. S. Remington*	980	75.1	+21.1
Labour	Mrs M. E. Protheroe	956	73.3	+20.0
Conservative	Mrs I. E. Harrington	270	20.7	−22.1
Conservative	J. Wilson	260	19.9	−20.8
Independent	P. D. Groves	45	3.4	N/A
Turnout		1,305	33.4	+10.2
Labour hold		Swing		
Labour hold		Swing		

=== Highgate ===
Highgate (3)
Party	Candidate	Votes	%	±%
Conservative	P. P. Rigby*	2,056	59.9	−7.3
Conservative	Mrs S. A. S. Whitby	2,028	59.1	−7.3
Conservative	Sir R. P. Williams*	2,028	59.1	−8.0
Labour	Mrs N. Harrison	1,359	39.6	+19.9
Labour	W. J. Quinn	1,333	38.8	+20.3
Labour	Mrs K. E. E. Carruthers	1,329	38.7	+20.4
Turnout		3,433	39.6	−3.0
Conservative hold		Swing		
Conservative hold		Swing		
Conservative hold		Swing		

=== Muswell Hill ===
Muswell Hill (3)
Party	Candidate	Votes	%	±%
Conservative	Mrs J. Cooper*	2,121	59.1	−13.2
Conservative	J. M. Cooke*	2,107	58.8	−13.9
Conservative	Miss A. Harris*	2,046	57.1	−12.7
Labour	V. P. Gellay	1,283	35.8	+19.4
Labour	D. R. Lewin	1,274	35.5	+19.3
Labour	B. C. Murphy	1,253	34.9	+19.4
Liberal	J. S. Martin	244	6.8	−1.6
Liberal	D. R. Trafford	244	6.8	−2.0
Liberal	J. E. Socker	205	5.7	−2.4
Communist	Mrs G. M. Jones	110	3.1	−0.4
Turnout		3,586	41.7	−3.8
Conservative hold		Swing		
Conservative hold		Swing		
Conservative hold		Swing		

=== Noel Park ===
Noel Park (4)
Party	Candidate	Votes	%	±%
Labour	G. W. C. Peacock	2,798	66.8	+27.7
Labour	R. A. Penton	2,769	66.1	+24.8
Labour	E. W. J. Young	2,756	65.8	+25.5
Labour	D. F. W. Billingsley	2,653	63.4	+25.7
Conservative	M. S. Hiller**	1,293	30.9	−26.3
Conservative	Mrs M. E. Human*	1,277	30.5	−23.3
Conservative	K. F. Wheatley	1,265	30.2	−23.6
Conservative	K. J. Reeves	1,256	30.0	−21.0
Turnout		4,186	37.1	+4.5
Labour gain from Conservative		Swing		
Labour gain from Conservative		Swing		
Labour gain from Conservative		Swing		
Labour gain from Conservative		Swing		

M. S. Hiller was a sitting councillor for Coleraine ward.

=== Park ===
Park (3)
Party	Candidate	Votes	%	±%
Labour	V. Butler*	2,653	81.6	+29.2
Labour	C. W. Ware*	2,453	75.4	+25.3
Labour	Mrs L. A. Angell*	2,427	74.6	+27.6
Conservative	R. G. Hoskins	431	13.2	−11.6
Conservative	Mrs Z. D. Tuck	396	12.2	−13.1
Conservative	Mrs E. H. E. Miller	384	11.8	−10.6
Independent	R. G. Wigley	312	9.6	−16.9
Turnout		3,253	34.7	+8.8
Labour hold		Swing		
Labour hold		Swing		
Labour hold		Swing		

=== Seven Sisters ===
Seven Sisters (3)
Party	Candidate	Votes	%	±%
Labour	F. A. Knight	2,051	81.2	+35.2
Labour	Mrs D. Cunningham	2,046	81.0	+37.8
Labour	L. H. Collis	2,029	80.4	+36.9
Conservative	Miss S. A. Clarke	381	15.1	−34.4
Conservative	Mrs E. L. Greening	369	14.6	−34.9
Conservative	Mrs J. E. Macer	352	13.9	−33.8
Turnout		2,525	34.6	+4.1
Labour gain from Conservative		Swing		
Labour gain from Conservative		Swing		
Labour gain from Conservative		Swing		

=== South Hornsey ===
South Hornsey (3)
Party	Candidate	Votes	%	±%
Labour	Mrs L. H. Lipson	1,680	57.9	+22.8
Labour	U. M. Thompson	1,641	56.6	+22.5
Labour	F. Neuner	1,612	55.6	+22.0
Conservative	Miss M. B. Gillman	998	34.4	−23.7
Conservative	S. M. Ayres*	984	33.9	−23.6
Conservative	S. G. Parker	964	33.2	−24.9
National Front	G. G. Bedford	136	4.7	N/A
Communist	J. McLeod	123	4.2	−2.9
National Front	B. W. Pell	103	3.6	N/A
Turnout		2,900	38.5	+4.2
Labour gain from Conservative		Swing		
Labour gain from Conservative		Swing		
Labour gain from Conservative		Swing		

=== South Tottenham ===
South Tottenham (2)
Party	Candidate	Votes	%	±%
Labour	Mrs S. A. Berkery Smith*	1,339	65.0	+23.2
Labour	A. T. Protheroe*	1,321	64.2	+24.4
Independent	M. P. Coney	490	23.8	N/A
Conservative	Mrs H. C. Cane	313	15.2	−19.4
Conservative	G. T. Alleyne	286	13.9	−20.5
Turnout		2,059	34.8	+6.4
Labour hold		Swing		
Labour hold		Swing		

=== Stroud Green ===
Stroud Green (3)
Party	Candidate	Votes	%	±%
Conservative	Miss C. D. Jackson**	1,390	44.0	−24.8
Conservative	J. Lotery*	1,375	43.5	−28.9
Conservative	B. R. Lewis*	1,359	43.0	−29.3
Labour	D. A. Bell	1,179	37.3	+15.7
Labour	Mrs J. E. Thexton	1,179	37.3	+16.7
Labour	Mrs M. E. Warbis	1,145	36.2	+15.7
Liberal	D. C. Racher	444	14.0	N/A
Liberal	Mrs L. M. Ryder	395	12.5	N/A
Liberal	F. G. Wise	382	12.1	N/A
Communist	M. J. Prior	119	3.8	−0.6
National Front	D. J. Hackett	74	2.3	N/A
National Front	H. E. Baker	65	2.1	N/A
Turnout		3,161	38.9	+4.3
Conservative hold		Swing		
Conservative hold		Swing		
Conservative hold		Swing		

Miss C. D. Jackson was a sitting councillor for Central Hornsey ward.

=== Tottenham Central ===
Tottenham Central (3)
Party	Candidate	Votes	%	±%
Labour	D. Clark	1,527	70.1	+35.7
Labour	E. A. Remington	1,522	69.9	+34.8
Labour	R. Turner	1,506	69.1	+35.2
Conservative	P. S. Shrank	568	26.1	−35.8
Conservative	Mrs D. M. Blunden	561	25.8	−35.4
Conservative	R. C. Black	549	25.2	−35.6
Turnout		2,178	33.7	+8.5
Labour gain from Conservative		Swing		
Labour gain from Conservative		Swing		
Labour gain from Conservative		Swing		

=== Town Hall ===
Town Hall (3)
Party	Candidate	Votes	%	±%
Labour	Mrs E. Murphy	1,817	55.0	+22.5
Labour	F. C. Carnell*	1,811	54.8	+22.6
Labour	F. P. Nicholls	1,803	54.6	+23.3
Conservative	R. W. Painter	1,351	40.9	−21.4
Conservative	A. E. Roy*	1,337	40.5	−25.3
Conservative	R. D. Smith*	1,323	40.1	−22.9
Turnout		3,303	40.0	+2.4
Labour gain from Conservative		Swing		
Labour gain from Conservative		Swing		
Labour gain from Conservative		Swing		

=== Turnpike ===
Turnpike (2)
Party	Candidate	Votes	%	±%
Labour	T. R. O'Sullivan	1,282	61.3	+26.7
Labour	D. Flower	1,279	61.2	+26.8
Conservative	T. W. A. Easton	753	36.0	−24.5
Conservative	S. A. Shrank*	720	34.4	−24.9
Socialist (GB)	J. Carter	25	1.2	N/A
Socialist (GB)	A. J. L. Buick	17	0.8	N/A
Turnout		2,090	38.8	+1.8
Labour gain from Conservative		Swing		
Labour gain from Conservative		Swing		

=== West Green ===
West Green (3)
Party	Candidate	Votes	%	±%
Labour	Mrs G. Atkinson	1,684	56.2	+28.4
Labour	G. Pollard	1,585	52.9	+24.3
Labour	A. Krokou	1,550	51.7	+24.3
Conservative	Mrs E. M. Donno**	1,262	42.1	−16.0
Conservative	Mrs J. Jones	1,262	42.1	−23.9
Conservative	W. C. Donno*	1,250	41.7	−25.4
Turnout		2,997	36.0	±0.0
Labour gain from Conservative		Swing		
Labour gain from Conservative		Swing		
Labour gain from Conservative		Swing		

Mrs E. M. Donno was a sitting councillor for Seven Sisters ward.

== By-elections ==
Muswell Hill by-election, 1 June 1972
Party	Candidate	Votes	%	±%
Conservative	R. J. Atkins	1,787	56.4	−2.4
Labour	C. L. Silverstone	1,127	35.6	−0.2
Liberal	A. Duddington	254	8.0	+1.2
Turnout			36.8%	
Conservative hold		Swing		

Turnpike by-election, 6 July 1972
Party	Candidate	Votes	%	±%
Labour	C. L. Silverstone	1,058	65.4	+4.2
Conservative	T. W. A. Easton	510	31.5	−4.5
Liberal	J. P. Musgrove	49	3.0	N/A
Turnout			30.7%	
Labour hold		Swing		

Coleraine by-election, 8 March 1973
Party	Candidate	Votes	%	±%
Labour	M. Dinning	2,120	67.2	−4.8
Conservative	J. L. Carrington	780	24.7	+0.9
National Front	B. W. Pell	254	8.1	N/A
Turnout			28.3%	
Labour hold		Swing		

High Cross by-election, 25 October 1973
Party	Candidate	Votes	%	±%
Labour	D. C. Rumble	507	57.5	−15.8
Conservative	J. L. Carrington	223	25.3	+4.6
National Independence Party & Residents Association	F. E. Knox	100	11.4	N/A
National Front	H. C. Lord	51	5.8	N/A
Turnout			25.9%	
Labour hold		Swing		

South Tottenham by-election, 25 October 1973
Party	Candidate	Votes	%	±%
Labour	Aaron Weichselbaum	964	46.7	−17.5
National Independence Party & Residents Association	Michael Coney	730	35.4	+11.6
Liberal	P. W. O'Brien	190	9.2	N/A
Conservative	W. E. Band	139	6.7	−8.5
National Front	S. Crowther	40	1.9	N/A
Turnout			34.4%	
Labour hold		Swing		

Tottenham Central by-election, 25 October 1973
Party	Candidate	Votes	%	±%
Labour	A. D. Rumble	721	64.6	−5.3
Conservative	G. E. Ryan	218	19.5	−6.6
National Front	R. May	177	15.9	N/A
Turnout			17.1 %	
Labour hold		Swing		
