= 1968 Haringey London Borough Council election =

The 1968 Haringey Council election took place on 9 May 1968 to elect members of Haringey London Borough Council in London, England. The whole council was up for election and the Conservative Party gained overall control of the council.

== Election result ==
Haringey local election result 1968
Party	Seats	Gains	Losses	Net gain/loss	Seats %	Votes %	Votes	+/−
Conservative	53	34	0	+34				
Labour	7	0	34	-34				
Communist	0	0	0	±0	0.0			
Liberal	0	0	0	±0	0.0			
Hornsey College of Art	0	0	0	±0	0.0			
Socialist (GB)	0	0	0	±0	0.0			
Independent	0	0	0	±0	0.0			

== Ward results ==
=== Alexandra-Bowes ===
Alexandra-Bowes (4)
Party	Candidate	Votes	%	±%
Conservative	V. N. Jary*	3,590	73.2	+19.3
Conservative	Mrs M. O. Moutrie	3,565	72.7	+17.2
Conservative	D. J. Patrick	3,556	72.5	+17.4
Conservative	E. W. Rayner	3,548	72.4	+18.4
Labour	R. A. Penton**	1,210	24.7	−18.4
Labour	J. W. Barnett	1,202	24.5	−18.0
Labour	G. C. Jimack	1,197	24.4	−16.6
Labour	D. Ghosh	1,167	23.8	−17.1
Turnout		4,902	39.3	+0.5
Conservative hold		Swing		
Conservative hold		Swing		
Conservative hold		Swing		
Conservative hold		Swing		

R. A. Penton was a sitting councillor for Park ward.

=== Bruce Grove ===
Bruce Grove (3)
Party	Candidate	Votes	%	±%
Conservative	J. A. Croft	1,550	58.6	+22.3
Conservative	D. Beale	1,541	58.3	+23.2
Conservative	P. E. Hitchens	1,408	53.3	+18.3
Labour	E. G. Large*	989	37.4	−23.2
Labour	R. L. Singer*	954	36.1	−22.2
Labour	E. M. Smith	936	35.4	−22.3
Communist	H. S. Harman	193	7.3	+0.4
Turnout		2,643	31.0	−0.8
Conservative gain from Labour		Swing		
Conservative gain from Labour		Swing		
Conservative gain from Labour		Swing		

=== Central Hornsey ===
Central Hornsey (3)
Party	Candidate	Votes	%	±%
Conservative	Miss C. D. Jackson	1,769	60.9	+25.3
Conservative	R. J. Atkins	1,768	60.8	+26.3
Conservative	Mrs C. J. Levinson	1,681	57.8	+23.4
Labour	M. F. Dewar	1,033	35.5	−26.9
Labour	B. D. Lipson*	1,017	35.0	−28.3
Labour	J. Martin	994	34.2	−27.8
Communist	W. Wayne	94	3.2	+1.1
Turnout		2,906	39.2	+0.9
Conservative gain from Labour		Swing		
Conservative gain from Labour		Swing		
Conservative gain from Labour		Swing		

=== Coleraine ===
Coleraine (4)
Party	Candidate	Votes	%	±%
Conservative	E. C. Godfrey	1,650	51.0	+27.9
Conservative	G. C. Cleaver	1,619	50.0	+27.6
Conservative	M. S. Hiller	1,557	48.1	+25.7
Conservative	M. A. Warburton	1,522	47.0	+25.3
Labour	E. V. Garwood*	1,465	45.3	−19.6
Labour	L. H. Collis*	1,456	45.0	−19.9
Labour	C. D. Moss**	1,368	42.3	−22.7
Labour	I. L. Peirce	1,363	42.1	−22.0
Communist	A. Salisbury	253	7.8	+4.8
Turnout		3,236	30.6	+1.2
Conservative gain from Labour		Swing		
Conservative gain from Labour		Swing		
Conservative gain from Labour		Swing		
Conservative gain from Labour		Swing		

C. D. Moss was a sitting councillor for Noel Park ward.

=== Crouch End ===
Crouch End (3)
Party	Candidate	Votes	%	±%
Conservative	B. G. Falk	2,688	76.5	+26.6
Conservative	B. D. Smith*	2,660	75.7	+25.1
Conservative	Miss S. A. Jones	2,637	75.0	+25.2
Labour	D. F. Hendry	728	20.7	−17.8
Labour	C. Tikly	653	18.6	−19.5
Labour	J. J. Jaffé	651	18.5	−19.4
Communist	Mrs M. Morris	210	6.0	+1.4
Turnout		3,514	38.4	−5.1
Conservative hold		Swing		
Conservative hold		Swing		
Conservative hold		Swing		

=== Fortis Green ===
Fortis Green (3)
Party	Candidate	Votes	%	±%
Conservative	C. Hannington**	2,695	75.6	+16.2
Conservative	D. F. P. Rosa	2,695	75.6	+16.8
Conservative	C. H. Harvey	2,679	75.1	+16.4
Labour	Mrs P. M. Wilson	704	19.7	−11.8
Labour	P. Hinchliff	686	19.2	−12.0
Labour	J. A. Caton	665	18.6	−12.5
Communist	E. Cohen	202	5.7	+2.6
Turnout		3,566	42.9	−0.2
Conservative hold		Swing		
Conservative hold		Swing		
Conservative hold		Swing		

C. Hannington was a sitting councillor for Stroud Green ward.

=== Green Lanes ===
Green Lanes (3)
Party	Candidate	Votes	%	±%
Conservative	J. J. Human	1,295	58.8	+30.7
Conservative	Mrs H. M. Bavin	1,266	57.4	+27.5
Conservative	P. D. Tuck	1,219	55.3	+26.0
Labour	A. J. R. Chaplin*	901	40.9	−15.0
Labour	Mrs M. E. Protheroe*	825	37.4	−20.9
Labour	Mrs J. M. Smith	813	36.9	−20.8
Turnout		2,204	25.7	±0.0
Conservative gain from Labour		Swing		
Conservative gain from Labour		Swing		
Conservative gain from Labour		Swing		

=== High Cross ===
High Cross (2)
Party	Candidate	Votes	%	±%
Labour	Mrs B. S. Remington*	658	54.0	−29.0
Labour	J. R. Searle	650	53.3	−25.5
Conservative	R. Wright	522	42.8	+28.2
Conservative	Mrs E. E. Fitter	496	40.7	+26.6
Turnout		1,219	23.2	−0.8
Labour hold		Swing		
Labour hold		Swing		

=== Highgate ===
Highgate (3)
Party	Candidate	Votes	%	±%
Conservative	P. P. Rigby*	2,354	67.2	+11.9
Conservative	Sir R. P. Williams	2,348	67.1	+13.0
Conservative	H. J. Worms*	2,323	66.4	+11.8
Labour	J. M. Marquand	689	19.7	−10.7
Labour	L. R. Norman	647	18.5	−11.9
Labour	P. L. Davis	642	18.3	−11.2
Liberal	Mrs D. C. M. Lambton	428	12.2	−0.5
Liberal	N. S. Lambert	382	10.9	−1.6
Liberal	R. J. Aron	346	9.9	−2.3
Communist	D. G. Parker	120	3.4	−0.6
Turnout		3,501	42.6	+1.5
Conservative hold		Swing		
Conservative hold		Swing		
Conservative hold		Swing		

=== Muswell Hill ===
Muswell Hill (3)
Party	Candidate	Votes	%	±%
Conservative	J. M. Cooke	2,839	72.7	+9.7
Conservative	Dr J. Cooper	2,820	72.3	+9.9
Conservative	Miss A. Harris	2,723	69.8	+7.5
Labour	N. L. Brewer	639	16.4	−11.3
Labour	H. Green	631	16.2	−10.6
Labour	O. N. Berry	606	15.5	−10.1
Liberal	D. R. Trafford	343	8.8	+0.1
Liberal	J. S. Martin	326	8.4	+0.3
Liberal	D. N. Ison	316	8.1	+0.5
Communist	Mrs G. M. Jones	137	3.5	+0.6
Turnout		3,903	45.5	+1.7
Conservative hold		Swing		
Conservative hold		Swing		
Conservative hold		Swing		

=== Noel Park ===
Noel Park (4)
Party	Candidate	Votes	%	±%
Conservative	Mrs D. C. Findley**	2,141	57.2	+26.0
Conservative	Mrs M. E. Human	2,016	53.8	+22.8
Conservative	S. R. Gaubert	2,015	53.8	+23.6
Conservative	Miss J. R. Tarris	1,912	51.0	+21.9
Labour	R. G. Kendall*	1,547	41.3	−25.4
Labour	L. A. Vitoria**	1,510	40.3	−25.5
Labour	G. W. C. Peacock	1,466	39.1	−26.6
Labour	D. F. W. Billingsley	1,411	37.7	−27.9
Communist	Mrs E. L. Ramsay	167	4.5	−1.2
Communist	A. M. Rawle	123	3.3	N/A
Turnout		3,746	32.6	+1.5
Conservative gain from Labour		Swing		
Conservative gain from Labour		Swing		
Conservative gain from Labour		Swing		
Conservative gain from Labour		Swing		

Mrs D. C. Findley was a sitting councillor for Alexandra-Bowes ward. L. A. Vitoria was a sitting councillor for Town Hall ward.

=== Park ===
Park (3)
Party	Candidate	Votes	%	±%
Labour	V. Butler*	1,266	52.4	−28.9
Labour	C. W. Ware	1,209	50.1	−28.2
Labour	Mrs L. A. Angell**	1,134	47.0	−31.1
Independent	R. G. Wigley*	641	26.5	−51.8
Conservative	Mrs Z. D. Tuck	611	25.3	+9.4
Conservative	Mrs E. M. Smith	600	24.8	+9.5
Conservative	A. G. Willett	540	22.4	+7.1
Communist	J. A. Hiles	182	7.5	+1.3
Turnout		2,415	25.9	−1.2
Labour hold		Swing		
Labour hold		Swing		
Labour hold		Swing		

Mrs L. A. Angell was a sitting councillor for Noel Park ward.

=== Seven Sisters ===
Seven Sisters (3)
Party	Candidate	Votes	%	±%
Conservative	J. M. Scott	1,089	49.5	+28.6
Conservative	A. C. Perry	1,088	49.5	+28.8
Conservative	Mrs E. M. Donno	1,050	47.7	+29.2
Labour	F. A. Knight*	1,012	46.0	−30.6
Labour	R. A. R. Young	957	43.5	−29.7
Labour	Mrs D. Cunningham*	951	43.2	−30.7
Turnout		2,200	30.5	+8.8
Conservative gain from Labour		Swing		
Conservative gain from Labour		Swing		
Conservative gain from Labour		Swing		

=== South Hornsey ===
South Hornsey (3)
Party	Candidate	Votes	%	±%
Conservative	C. J. H. Shepherd	1,602	58.1	+19.4
Conservative	Dr E. A. W. Wilkins	1,602	58.1	+20.0
Conservative	S. M. Ayres	1,587	57.5	+20.9
Labour	Mrs L. H. Lipson**	967	35.1	−20.3
Labour	Mrs N. E. S. McIntosh*	940	34.1	−22.4
Labour	B. Murphy*	927	33.6	−22.7
Communist	R. J. Condon	196	7.1	−0.5
Turnout		2,758	34.3	−1.6
Conservative gain from Labour		Swing		
Conservative gain from Labour		Swing		
Conservative gain from Labour		Swing		

Mrs L. H. Lipson was a sitting councillor for West Green ward.

=== South Tottenham ===
South Tottenham (2)
Party	Candidate	Votes	%	±%
Labour	Mrs S. A. Berkery Smith*	713	41.8	−35.2
Labour	A. T. Protheroe*	679	39.8	−36.2
Conservative	R. A. Green	590	34.6	+16.7
Conservative	B. King	587	34.4	+16.9
Liberal	M. R. Gidley	322	18.9	N/A
Liberal	D. A. F. Arnold	300	17.6	N/A
Turnout		1,704	28.4	+4.9
Labour hold		Swing		
Labour hold		Swing		

=== Stroud Green ===
Stroud Green (3)
Party	Candidate	Votes	%	±%
Conservative	J. Lotery*	2,026	72.4	+15.8
Conservative	G. H. Stansall*	2,021	72.3	+16.2
Conservative	B. Lewis	1,923	68.8	+12.3
Labour	J. E. Wehrfritz	604	21.6	−19.8
Labour	E. W. J. Young	576	20.6	−20.5
Labour	W. L. Akerman	572	20.5	−19.6
Communist	M. Baker	122	4.4	−0.2
Hornsey College of Art	M. J. Coles	69	2.5	N/A
Socialist (GB)	A. J. L. Buick	52	1.9	N/A
Socialist (GB)	J. Carter	49	1.8	N/A
Socialist (GB)	J. P. Lee	49	1.8	N/A
Turnout		2,797	34.6	−4.6
Conservative hold		Swing		
Conservative hold		Swing		
Conservative hold		Swing		

=== Tottenham Central ===
Tottenham Central (3)
Party	Candidate	Votes	%	±%
Conservative	J. F. C. Good	1,175	61.9	+40.5
Conservative	Miss R. A. Whitehead	1,163	61.2	+42.1
Conservative	T. W. Wilkins	1,155	60.8	+42.0
Labour	E. A. Remington*	666	35.1	−41.0
Labour	R. W. H. Ford*	653	34.4	−34.3
Labour	Mrs J. Searle	644	33.9	−39.2
Turnout		1,899	25.2	+5.1
Conservative gain from Labour		Swing		
Conservative gain from Labour		Swing		
Conservative gain from Labour		Swing		

=== Town Hall ===
Town Hall (3)
Party	Candidate	Votes	%	±%
Conservative	A. E. Roy	1,911	65.8	+22.4
Conservative	R. D. Smith	1,829	63.0	+19.2
Conservative	R. G. Anderson	1,808	62.3	+19.9
Labour	D. Page*	944	32.5	−20.9
Labour	F. C. Carnell	936	32.2	−22.1
Labour	F. P. Nicholls	908	31.3	−21.9
Communist	Mrs L. H. Medus	156	5.4	+1.8
Turnout		2,904	37.6	+1.5
Conservative gain from Labour		Swing		
Conservative gain from Labour		Swing		
Conservative gain from Labour		Swing		

=== Turnpike ===
Turnpike (2)
Party	Candidate	Votes	%	±%
Conservative	G. J. Y. Murphy	1,275	60.5	+20.2
Conservative	S. A. Shrank	1,250	59.3	+20.8
Labour	A. R. McIntosh*	728	34.6	−20.3
Labour	C. J. Ettinger*	725	34.4	−20.1
Communist	G. A. Brain	73	3.5	−1.3
Turnout		2,107	37.0	+3.7
Conservative gain from Labour		Swing		
Conservative gain from Labour		Swing		

=== West Green ===
West Green (3)
Party	Candidate	Votes	%	±%
Conservative	H. E. Spratt	1,945	68.1	+22.9
Conservative	W. C. Donno	1,917	67.1	+20.1
Conservative	Mrs P. A. Spratt	1,885	66.0	+20.4
Labour	Mrs A. F. Remington	817	28.6	−21.7
Labour	Mrs G. Atkinson	793	27.8	−21.5
Labour	D. Clark*	782	27.4	−24.9
Turnout		2,857	36.0	+2.6
Conservative gain from Labour		Swing		
Conservative gain from Labour		Swing		
Conservative gain from Labour		Swing		

== By-elections ==
Town Hall by-election, 4 June 1970
Party	Candidate	Votes	%	±%
Labour	F. C. Carnell	1,234	51.6	+19.4
Conservative	R. W. Painter	1,146	47.9	−14.4
Socialist (GB)	A. J. L. Buick	11	0.5	N/A
Turnout			29.6%	
Labour gain from Conservative		Swing		

Coleraine by-election, 16 July 1970
Party	Candidate	Votes	%	±%
Labour	E. V. Garwood	2,150	63.2	+17.9
Conservative	W. R. W. Taylor	1,204	35.4	−11.6
Communist	A. Salisbury	50	1.5	−6.3
Turnout			30.4%	
Labour gain from Conservative		Swing		
