= 1974 Haringey London Borough Council election =

The 1974 Haringey Council election took place on 2 May 1974 to elect members of Haringey London Borough Council in London, England. The whole council was up for election and the Labour party stayed in overall control of the council.

== Ward results ==
=== Alexandra-Bowes ===
Alexandra-Bowes (4)
Party	Candidate	Votes	%	±%
Conservative	V. N. Jary*	2,381	49.6	−2.9
Conservative	S. R. Gaubert*	2,377	49.5	−2.7
Conservative	T. E. Allen	2,374	49.5	−2.2
Conservative	E. W. Rayner*	2,334	48.6	−3.2
Labour	D. F. W. Billingsley**	1,550	32.3	−13.7
Labour	J. F. Hall	1,533	31.9	−13.7
Labour	W. Nicholls	1,502	31.3	−13.8
Labour	R. A. Penton**	1,448	30.2	−14.8
Liberal	A. F. Jowett	798	16.6	N/A
Liberal	B. B. Sloam	744	15.5	N/A
Liberal	Mrs J. M. Wilson	734	15.3	N/A
Liberal	N. G. Thomson	709	14.8	N/A
Turnout		4,799	38.0	−0.5
Conservative hold		Swing		
Conservative hold		Swing		
Conservative hold		Swing		
Conservative hold		Swing		

D. F. W. Billingsley was a sitting councillor for Noel Park ward. R. A. Penton was a sitting councillor for Noel Park ward.

=== Bruce Grove ===
Bruce Grove (3)
Party	Candidate	Votes	%	±%
Labour	E. M. Smith*	1,173	61.9	−6.5
Labour	Mrs J. M. Smith*	1,147	60.6	−6.7
Labour	R. A. R. Young*	1,095	57.8	−8.9
Conservative	W. L. Hurley	601	31.7	+2.2
Conservative	D. King	586	30.9	+1.5
Conservative	D. Beale	577	30.5	+1.2
Turnout		1,894	22.2	−13.4
Labour hold		Swing		
Labour hold		Swing		
Labour hold		Swing		

=== Central Hornsey ===
Central Hornsey (3)
Party	Candidate	Votes	%	±%
Labour	B. A. Bullard	1,181	47.5	−9.2
Labour	N. A. Cameron*	1,176	47.3	−12.4
Labour	B. D. Lipson*	1,105	44.5	−14.5
Conservative	J. M. S. Drew	808	32.5	+1.3
Conservative	Mrs Y. N. Owen	797	32.1	+1.4
Conservative	B. L. Salinger	795	32.0	+2.1
National Front	H. C. Lord	302	12.2	+8.6
National Front	R. May	274	11.0	N/A
National Front	Mrs S. May	257	10.3	N/A
Liberal	M. W. Rogers	175	7.0	+1.6
Communist	Mrs L. Hickey	85	3.4	N/A
Turnout		2,484	39.2	−6.7
Labour hold		Swing		
Labour hold		Swing		
Labour hold		Swing		

=== Coleraine ===
Coleraine (4)
Party	Candidate	Votes	%	±%
Labour	Mrs D. Cunningham**	1,988	61.5	−10.5
Labour	Mrs E. Garwood	1,912	59.2	−12.0
Labour	E. V. Garwood*	1,892	58.6	−14.8
Labour	Mrs M. F. Dewar*	1,860	57.6	−14.4
Conservative	Miss J. A. Godfrey	775	24.0	+0.2
Conservative	W. R. W. Taylor	759	23.5	−0.5
Conservative	Miss E. M. Harries	733	22.7	−0.5
Conservative	W. E. Band	641	19.8	−2.4
Liberal	P. Snelling	479	14.8	N/A
Turnout		3,230	28.2	−11.8
Labour hold		Swing		
Labour hold		Swing		
Labour hold		Swing		
Labour hold		Swing		

Mrs D. Cunningham was a sitting councillor for Seven Sisters ward.

=== Crouch End ===
Crouch End (3)
Party	Candidate	Votes	%	±%
Conservative	B. G. Falk*	1,864	50.4	−1.5
Conservative	B. D. Smith*	1,849	50.0	−2.0
Conservative	W. A. Blackburne	1,818	49.1	−2.2
Labour	R. S. Cotton	1,183	32.0	−9.3
Labour	D. H. Stenhouse	1,140	30.8	−10.0
Labour	U. M. Thompson**	1,100	29.7	−10.8
Liberal	P. W. O’Brien	637	17.2	+10.6
Liberal	Mrs C. G. Edwards	542	14.7	+8.4
Liberal	H. O. Warschauer	445	12.0	+5.9
Turnout		3,699	44.3	+6.4
Conservative hold		Swing		
Conservative hold		Swing		
Conservative hold		Swing		

U. M. Thompson was a sitting councillor for South Hornsey ward.

=== Fortis Green ===
Fortis Green (3)
Party	Candidate	Votes	%	±%
Conservative	C. Hannington*	1,782	55.1	−6.3
Conservative	Mrs P. A. Hodgson	1,762	54.4	−7.4
Conservative	G. J. Y. Murphy*	1,712	52.9	−8.0
Labour	R. P. Lowe	1,018	31.4	−1.9
Labour	R. M. Fisher	1,013	31.3	−0.6
Labour	G. M. Rowan-Robinson	933	28.8	−3.0
Liberal	W. G. Wood	367	11.3	N/A
Liberal	A. J. Emmerson	353	10.9	N/A
Liberal	J. M. H. Levene	332	10.3	N/A
Communist	Mrs G. M. Jones	169	5.2	−1.2
Turnout		3,237	40.6	+2.2
Conservative hold		Swing		
Conservative hold		Swing		
Conservative hold		Swing		

=== Green Lanes ===
Green Lanes (3)
Party	Candidate	Votes	%	±%
Labour	G. E. Greenacre*	1,015	58.5	−10.0
Labour	A. G. Hudson*	984	56.7	−11.5
Labour	G. F. Meehan*	960	55.3	−12.5
Conservative	K. G. Palos	556	32.0	+1.8
Conservative	Mrs I. E. Harrington	532	30.7	+2.1
Conservative	L. J. Farthing	511	29.5	+1.1
Turnout		1,735	24.1	−7.8
Labour hold		Swing		
Labour hold		Swing		
Labour hold		Swing		

=== High Cross ===
High Cross (2)
Party	Candidate	Votes	%	±%
Labour	Mrs B. S. Remington*	497	72.4	−2.7
Labour	D. C. Rumble*	445	64.9	−8.4
Conservative	R. E. Plumb	149	21.7	+1.0
Conservative	I. Crowther	143	20.8	+0.9
Turnout		686	21.2	−12.2
Labour hold		Swing		
Labour hold		Swing		

=== Highgate ===
Highgate (3)
Party	Candidate	Votes	%	±%
Conservative	P. P. Rigby*	1,707	54.1	−5.8
Conservative	Mrs S. A. S. Whitby*	1,692	53.6	−5.5
Conservative	Mrs D. E. Whitmore	1,633	51.7	−7.4
Labour	Mrs M. E. Caines	921	29.2	−10.4
Labour	Mrs J. M. Goodwin	884	28.0	−10.8
Labour	H. M. Stedman	880	27.9	−10.8
Liberal	D. W. Maxwell	512	16.2	N/A
Liberal	Mrs B. C. Zentner	452	14.3	N/A
Liberal	D. J. L. Richardson	443	14.0	N/A
Turnout		3,156	39.0	−0.6
Conservative hold		Swing		
Conservative hold		Swing		
Conservative hold		Swing		

=== Muswell Hill ===
Muswell Hill (3)
Party	Candidate	Votes	%	±%
Conservative	R. J. Atkins*	1,755	55.5	−3.6
Conservative	Miss A. Harris*	1,738	54.9	−2.2
Conservative	Miss C. D. Jackson**	1,710	54.1	−4.7
Labour	Mrs G. M. Dain	962	30.4	−5.4
Labour	D. R. Lewin	939	29.7	−5.8
Labour	M. S. Watson	918	29.0	−5.9
Liberal	D. R. Trafford	388	12.3	+5.5
Liberal	Mrs A. Duddington	379	12.0	+5.2
Liberal	I. Single	347	11.0	+5.3
Turnout		3,163	39.5	−2.2
Conservative hold		Swing		
Conservative hold		Swing		
Conservative hold		Swing		

Miss C. D. Jackson was a sitting councillor for Stroud Green ward.

=== Noel Park ===
Noel Park (4)
Party	Candidate	Votes	%	±%
Labour	E. W. J. Young*	1,674	50.3	−15.5
Labour	C. P. Nuttall	1,592	47.9	−18.9
Labour	Mrs M. E. Warbris	1,580	47.5	−18.6
Labour	A. G. Krokou**	1,525	45.8	−17.6
Liberal	J. B. Heron	879	26.4	N/A
Liberal	J. Summerhill	840	25.2	N/A
Conservative	R. G. Hoskins	805	24.2	−6.7
Conservative	J. J. Human	790	23.7	−6.5
Conservative	P. E. Hitchens	782	23.5	−6.5
Conservative	Mrs M. E. Human	754	22.7	−7.8
Turnout		3,327	31.1	−6.0
Labour hold		Swing		
Labour hold		Swing		
Labour hold		Swing		
Labour hold		Swing		

A. G. Krokou was a sitting councillor for West Green ward.

=== Park ===
Park (3)
Party	Candidate	Votes	%	±%
Labour	V. Butler*	1,530	78.7	−2.9
Labour	D. Page**	1,301	67.0	−7.6
Labour	C. Ware*	1,245	64.1	−11.4
Conservative	Miss S. M. Lumb	342	17.6	+4.4
Conservative	Mrs J. Allen	339	17.4	+5.6
Conservative	Mrs Z. D. Tuck	312	16.1	+3.9
Turnout		1,943	21.4	−13.3
Labour hold		Swing		
Labour hold		Swing		
Labour hold		Swing		

D. Page was a sitting councillor for Coleraine ward.

=== Seven Sisters ===
Seven Sisters (3)
Party	Candidate	Votes	%	±%
Labour	F. A. Knight*	736	79.1	−2.1
Labour	L. H. Collis*	709	76.2	−4.2
Labour	E. W. Day	681	73.2	−7.8
Conservative	Mrs D. Atkins	158	17.0	+1.9
Conservative	Mrs L. Braithwaite	139	14.9	+0.3
Conservative	Mrs S. S. E. Hannington	126	13.5	−0.4
Turnout		1,630	24.0	−10.6
Labour hold		Swing		
Labour hold		Swing		
Labour hold		Swing		

=== South Hornsey ===
South Hornsey (3)
Party	Candidate	Votes	%	±%
Labour	J. B. Corbyn	1,190	50.6	−7.3
Labour	D. H. Billingsley	1,169	49.7	−6.9
Labour	F. Neuner*	1,041	44.3	−11.3
Conservative	B. C. Greaves	879	37.4	+3.0
Conservative	P. R. Haselwood	838	35.6	+1.7
Conservative	C. Kavallares	824	35.0	+1.8
Liberal	D. A. Arnold	198	8.4	N/A
Communist	J. A. Luckett	116	4.9	+0.7
Turnout		2,352	34.3	−4.2
Labour hold		Swing		
Labour hold		Swing		
Labour hold		Swing		

=== South Tottenham ===
South Tottenham (2)
Party	Candidate	Votes	%	±%
National Independence Party and Residents Association	M. P. Coney	1,039	47.8	+24.0
Labour	Miss J. L. Chapman	926	42.6	−22.4
Labour	A. Weichselbaum*	912	42.0	−22.2
National Independence Party and Residents Association	Mrs F. E. Knox	767	35.3	N/A
Conservative	G. Alleyn	145	6.7	−8.5
Conservative	E. Christoforides	124	5.7	−8.2
Turnout		2,174	37.2	+2.4
National Independence Party and Residents Association gain from Labour		Swing		
Labour hold		Swing		

=== Stroud Green ===
Stroud Green (3)
Party	Candidate	Votes	%	±%
Conservative	B. R. Lewis*	1,388	42.6	−0.4
Conservative	J. Lotery*	1,384	42.5	−1.0
Conservative	S. G. Parker	1,294	39.7	−4.3
Labour	G. Long	1,254	38.5	+1.2
Labour	Mrs E. M. Murphy**	1,203	36.9	−0.4
Labour	G. England	1,198	36.8	+0.6
Liberal	D. C. Racher	463	14.2	+0.2
Liberal	Miss G. E. O'Halloran	420	12.9	+0.4
Liberal	E. C. Sandy	400	12.3	+0.2
Communist	P. Sinclair	206	6.3	+2.5
Turnout		3,257	42.9	+4.0
Conservative hold		Swing		
Conservative hold		Swing		
Conservative hold		Swing		

Mrs E. M. Murphy was a sitting councillor for Town Hall ward.

=== Tottenham Central ===
Tottenham Central (3)
Party	Candidate	Votes	%	±%
Labour	Mrs A. D. Rumble*	915	61.4	−8.7
Labour	R. Turner*	885	59.4	−9.7
Labour	Miss K. A. Patrick	858	57.6	−12.3
Conservative	I. H. Bell	266	17.9	−8.2
Conservative	Mrs D. R. Bell	251	16.8	−9.0
National Front	R. W. Painter	235	15.8	N/A
National Front	K. Squire	214	14.4	N/A
Conservative	Miss J. M. Backhouse	212	14.2	−11.0
National Front	Mrs N. R. M. Kerby	201	13.5	N/A
Turnout		1,490	23.6	−10.1
Labour hold		Swing		
Labour hold		Swing		
Labour hold		Swing		

=== Town Hall ===
Town Hall (3)
Party	Candidate	Votes	%	±%
Labour	M. J. Butt	1,115	48.4	−6.6
Labour	Mrs L. H. Lipson**	1,046	45.4	−9.4
Labour	Mrs S. A. Berkery Smith**	1,026	44.5	−10.1
Conservative	K. T. Carr	943	40.9	±0.0
Conservative	J. L. Carrington	871	37.8	−2.7
Conservative	P. D. Tuck	864	37.5	−2.6
Liberal	D. M. Coombe	323	14.0	N/A
Turnout		2,304	29.0	−11.0
Labour hold		Swing		
Labour hold		Swing		
Labour hold		Swing		

Mrs L. H. Lipson was a sitting councillor for South Hornsey ward. Mrs S. A. Berkery Smith was a sitting councillor for South Tottenham ward.

=== Turnpike ===
Turnpike (2)
Party	Candidate	Votes	%	±%
Labour	T. R. O'Sullivan*	775	46.7	−14.6
Labour	C. L. Silverstone*	736	44.3	−16.9
Conservative	M. J. Harris	686	41.3	+6.9
Conservative	T. W. A. Easton	672	40.5	+4.5
Liberal	Mrs A. M. O'Brien	144	8.7	N/A
Turnout		1,661	34.0	−4.8
Labour hold		Swing		
Labour hold		Swing		

=== West Green ===
West Green (3)
Party	Candidate	Votes	%	±%
Labour	Mrs G. Atkinson*	1,098	60.1	+3.9
Labour	D. Clark**	891	48.8	−4.1
Labour	S. J. Whittle	871	47.7	−4.0
Conservative	Mrs E. M. Donno	768	42.0	−0.1
Conservative	A. J. Bell	763	41.8	−0.3
Conservative	W. C. Donno	755	41.3	−0.4
Turnout		2,827	29.9	−6.1
Labour hold		Swing		
Labour hold		Swing		
Labour hold		Swing		

D. Clark was a sitting councillor for Tottenham Central ward.

== By-elections ==
Noel Park by-election, 13 November 1975
Party	Candidate	Votes	%	±%
Labour	David Barlow	1,282	44.4	−3.5
Conservative	Paul E. Hitchens	1,210	41.9	+18.4
National Front	Keith Squire	395	13.7	N/A
Turnout			26.8	
Labour hold		Swing		

High Cross by-election, 11 December 1975
Party	Candidate	Votes	%	±%
Labour	Anthony McBrearty	341	32.0	−40.4
Tottenham Ratepayers	John Dodds	301	28.2	N/A
Conservative	John L. Carrington	255	23.9	+2.2
National Front	Henry C. Lord	107	10.0	N/A
Liberal	Katherine Alexander	62	5.8	N/A
Turnout			31.7	
Labour hold		Swing		

Fortis Green by-election, 24 March 1977
Party	Candidate	Votes	%	±%
Conservative	Jean Macgregor	1,730	55.1	+0.7
Labour	Susan L. Scales	1,063	33.9	+2.5
Liberal	John C. Wildsmith	202	6.4	−4.9
National Front	Sylvia E. May	142	4.5	N/A
Turnout			38.8	
Conservative hold		Swing		

Highgate by-election, 24 March 1977
Party	Candidate	Votes	%	±%
Conservative	Anthony Dignum	1,683	59.2	+5.1
Labour	Toby J. Harris	731	25.7	−3.5
Electoral Reform Liberal	Patrick W. O'Brien	369	13.0	−3.2
National Front	Leslie G. Butler	59	2.1	N/A
Turnout			35.0	
Conservative hold		Swing		

Muswell Hill by-election, 24 March 1977
Party	Candidate	Votes	%	±%
Conservative	Benjamin R. Hall	1,774	61.3	+5.8
Labour	Jacqueline M. Goodwin	711	24.6	−5.8
Liberal	Francis A. Coleman	299	10.3	−2.0
National Front	Bruce W. Pell	109	3.8	N/A
Turnout			36.1	
Conservative hold		Swing		
