= Jeremy Corbyn =

British politician (born 1949)

The Right Honourable Jeremy Corbyn MP
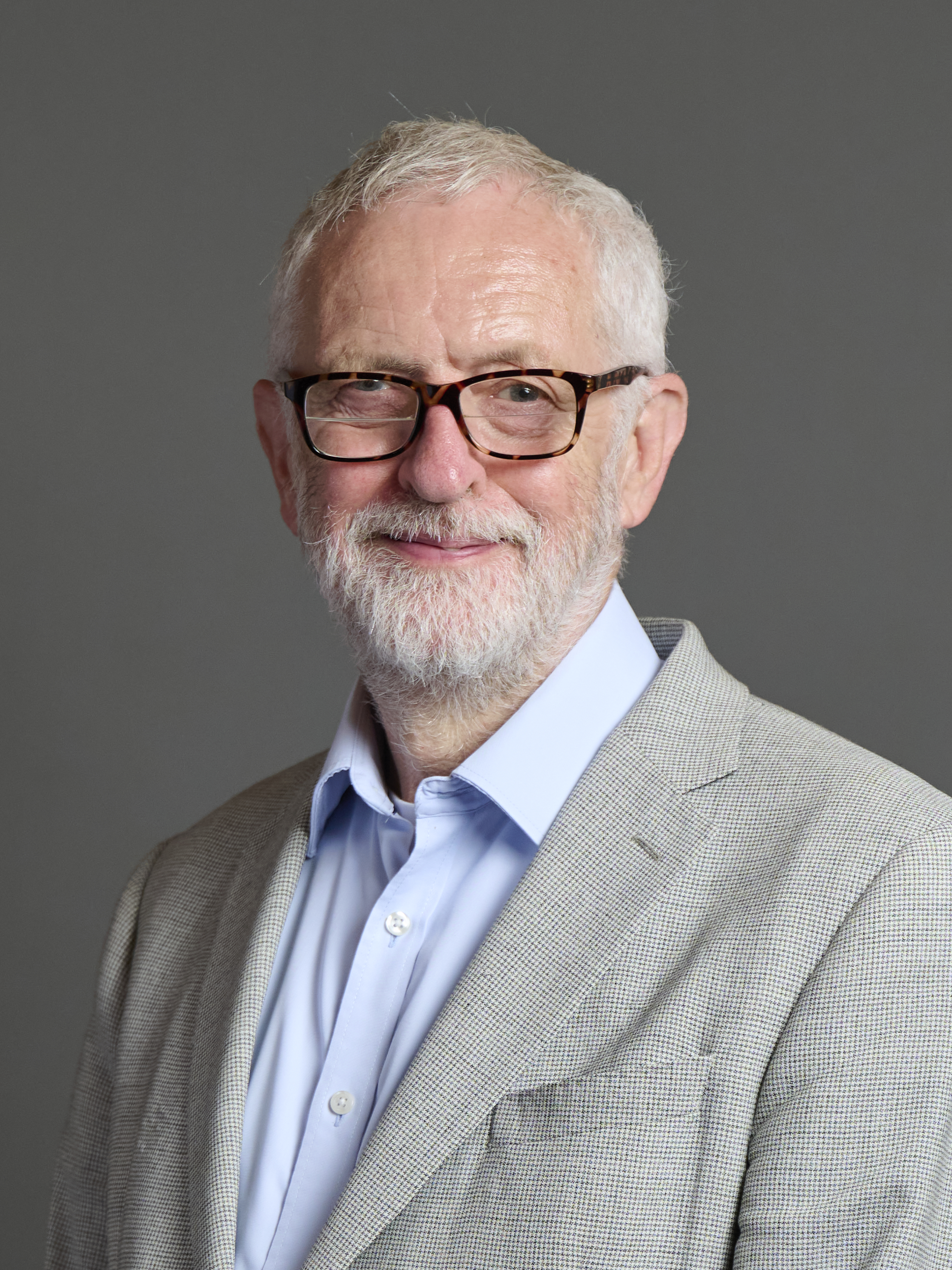
- Official portrait, 2024

Parliamentary Leader of Your Party
- Incumbent
- Assumed office 8 March 2026
- Preceded by: Office established

Leader of the Opposition
- In office 12 September 2015 – 4 April 2020
- Monarch: Elizabeth II
- Prime Minister: David Cameron; Theresa May; Boris Johnson
- Shadow First Secretary: Angela Eagle; Emily Thornberry
- Preceded by: Harriet Harman
- Succeeded by: Keir Starmer

Leader of the Labour Party
- In office 12 September 2015 – 4 April 2020
- Deputy: Tom Watson
- Preceded by: Ed Miliband (Note: Harriet Harman acted from 8 May to 12 September 2015.)
- Succeeded by: Keir Starmer

Chair of the Stop the War Coalition
- In office 14 June 2011 – 12 September 2015
- President: Tony Benn
- Vice President: Lindsey German
- Deputy: Chris Nineham
- Preceded by: Andrew Murray
- Succeeded by: Andrew Murray

Member of Parliament for Islington North
- Incumbent
- Assumed office 9 June 1983
- Preceded by: Michael O'Halloran
- Majority: 7,247 (14.8%)

Personal details
- Born: Jeremy Bernard Corbyn; 26 May 1949 (age 77) Chippenham, Wiltshire, England
- Party: Your Party (since 2025)
- Other political affiliations: Labour (1965–2024); Independent Alliance (2024–2025)
- Spouses: Jane Chapman (m. 1974; div. 1979); Claudia Bracchitta (m. 1987; div. 1999); Laura Álvarez (m. 2012)
- Children: 3
- Relatives: Piers Corbyn (brother)
- Education: Castle House School; Adams' Grammar School; North London Polytechnic (dropped out)
- Website: Official website
- Jeremy Corbyn's voice Corbyn on proportional representation (PR); Recorded on 7 September 2022

Jeremy Bernard Corbyn (/ˈkɔːrbɪn/; born 26 May 1949) is a British politician who has been the Member of Parliament (MP) for Islington North since 1983. He is the parliamentary leader of Your Party, which he co-founded with Zarah Sultana in July 2025. Corbyn had previously been a member of the Labour Party from 1965 until his automatic expulsion in 2024 for standing for election as an independent MP, and served as Leader of the Opposition and Leader of the Labour Party from 2015 to 2020 and was a member of the Socialist Campaign Group parliamentary caucus. He identifies ideologically as a socialist on the political left.

Born in Chippenham, Wiltshire, Corbyn joined the Labour Party as a teenager. Moving to London, he became a trade union representative. In 1974, he was elected to Haringey Council and became Secretary of Hornsey Constituency Labour Party until elected as the MP for Islington North in 1983. His activism has included Anti-Fascist Action, the Anti-Apartheid Movement, the Campaign for Nuclear Disarmament, and advocating for a united Ireland and Palestinian statehood. As a backbencher, Corbyn routinely voted against the Labour whip, including New Labour governments. A vocal opponent of the Iraq War, he chaired the Stop the War Coalition from 2011 to 2015, and received the Gandhi International Peace Award and Seán MacBride Peace Prize. Following Ed Miliband's resignation after the party had lost the 2015 general election, Corbyn won the 2015 party leadership election to succeed him. The Labour Party's membership increased sharply, both during the leadership campaign and following his election.

Taking the party to the left, Corbyn advocated renationalising public utilities and railways, a less interventionist military policy, and reversals of austerity cuts to welfare and public services. Although he had historically been critical of the European Union (EU), he supported the Remain campaign in the 2016 EU membership referendum. After Labour MPs sought to remove him in 2016 through a leadership challenge, he won a second leadership contest against Owen Smith. In the 2017 general election, Corbyn led Labour to increase its vote share by 10 percentage points to 40 per cent, their largest rise since the 1945 general election.

During his tenure as leader, Corbyn was criticised for antisemitism within the party. He condemned antisemitism and apologised for its presence, while his leadership saw a strengthening of disciplinary procedures regarding hate speech and racism. In 2019, after deadlock in Parliament over Brexit, Corbyn endorsed holding a referendum on the withdrawal agreement, with a personal stance of neutrality. In the 2019 general election, Labour's vote share fell to 32 per cent, leading to a loss of 60 seats, leaving it with 202, its fewest since the 1935 general election. Corbyn remained Labour leader for four months while the leadership election to replace him took place. His resignation as Labour leader formally took effect in April 2020 following the election of Keir Starmer, who led the party to victory at the next general election in 2024 with a vote share of 33.7 per cent.

After asserting that the scale of antisemitism within the party had been overstated for political reasons, Corbyn was suspended from the party in 2020. In May 2024, after the 2024 general election had been called, Corbyn was not allowed to stand as a Labour candidate for his constituency, and subsequently announced he would stand as an independent candidate for Islington North; he was then expelled from Labour. He won re-election with a majority of 7,247. In July 2025, Corbyn and fellow independent MP Zarah Sultana announced the formation of Your Party, and in March 2026 he was elected as the party's parliamentary leader.

== Early life ==
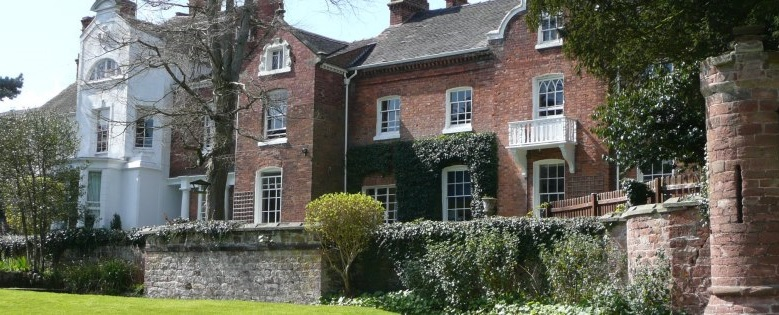
Castle House School, where Corbyn attended preparatory school

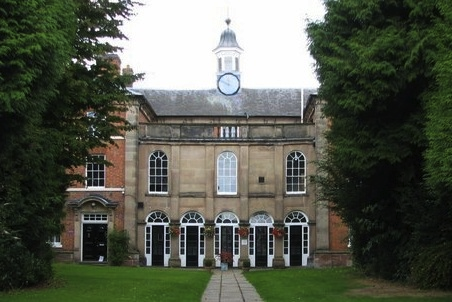
Adams Grammar School, where Corbyn attended secondary school

Jeremy Bernard Corbyn was born on 26 May 1949 in Chippenham, Wiltshire, the son of mathematics teacher Naomi Loveday (née Josling; 1915–1987) and electrical engineer and power rectifier expert David Benjamin Corbyn (1915–1986). He has three elder brothers; one of them, Piers Corbyn (born 1947), is a weather forecaster who later became known as a climate change denier and anti-vaccine conspiracy theorist. For the first seven years of his life, the family lived in Kington St Michael, Wiltshire. His parents were Labour Party members and peace campaigners who met in the 1930s at a committee meeting in support of the Second Spanish Republic at Conway Hall during the Spanish Civil War.

When Corbyn was seven, the family moved to Pave Lane, Shropshire, where his father bought Yew Tree Manor, a 17th-century farmhouse which was once part of the Duke of Sutherland's Lilleshall estate. Corbyn attended Castle House School, an independent preparatory school near Newport, Shropshire, before becoming a day student at Newport's Adams Grammar School at the age of 11.

While still at school, Corbyn became active in the League Against Cruel Sports and the Labour Party Young Socialists within The Wrekin. He was also a member of the leftist youth organisation the Woodcraft Folk. He joined the Labour Party at the age of 16. He achieved two A-Levels at grade E, the lowest possible passing grade, before leaving school at 18. Corbyn joined the Campaign for Nuclear Disarmament in 1966 while at school and later became one of its three vice-chairs and subsequently vice-president. Around this time, he also campaigned against the Vietnam War.

After school, Corbyn worked briefly as a reporter for the local Newport and Market Drayton Advertiser newspaper. Around the age of 19, he spent two years doing Voluntary Service Overseas in Jamaica as a youth worker and geography teacher. He subsequently visited Argentina, Brazil, Chile, and Uruguay throughout 1969 and 1970. While in Brazil, he participated in a student demonstration in São Paulo against the Brazilian military government. He also attended a May Day march in Santiago, where the atmosphere around Salvador Allende's Popular Unity alliance which swept to power in the Chilean elections of 1970 made an impression on him: "[I] noticed something very different from anything I had experienced... what Popular Unity and Allende had done was weld together the folk tradition, the song tradition, the artistic tradition and the intellectual tradition".

== Early career and political activities ==
Returning to the UK in 1971, Corbyn worked as an official for the National Union of Tailors and Garment Workers. He began a course in trade union studies at North London Polytechnic but left after a year without a degree. He worked as a trade union organiser for the National Union of Public Employees (NUPE) and Amalgamated Engineering and Electrical Union, where his union was approached by Tony Benn and "encouraged ... to produce a blueprint for workers' control of British Leyland"; the plans did not proceed after Benn was moved to a different Department.

Corbyn was appointed a member of a district health authority and in early 1974, at the age of 24, he was elected to Haringey Council from South Hornsey ward. After boundary changes in 1978 he was re-elected in Harringay ward as councillor, remaining so until 1983. As a delegate from Hornsey to the Labour Party Conference in 1978, Corbyn successfully moved a motion calling for dentists to be employed by the National Health Service (NHS) rather than as private contractors. He also spoke in another debate, describing a motion calling for greater support for law and order as "more appropriate to the National Front than to the Labour Party".

Corbyn became the local Labour Party's agent and organiser, and had responsibility for the 1979 general election campaign in Hornsey.

Around this time, he became involved with the London Labour Briefing, where he was a contributor. He was described by The Times in 1981 as "Briefing's founder"; The Economist in a 1982 article named Corbyn as "Briefing's general secretary figure", as did a profile on Corbyn compiled by parliamentary biographer Andrew Roth in 2004, which states that he joined the editorial board as General Secretary in 1979. Michael Crick, in the 2016 edition of his book Militant, says that Corbyn was "a member of the editorial board", as does Lansley, Goss and Wolmar's 1989 work The Rise and Fall of the Municipal Left. Corbyn said in 2017 that these reports were inaccurate, telling Sophy Ridge: "I read the magazine. I wrote for the magazine. I was not a member of the editorial board. I didn't agree with it."

He worked on Tony Benn's unsuccessful deputy leadership campaign in 1981. Corbyn was keen to allow former International Marxist Group member Tariq Ali to join the party, despite Labour's National Executive having declared him unacceptable, and declared that "so far as we are concerned ... he's a member of the party and he'll be issued with a card." In May 1982, when Corbyn was chairman of the Constituency Labour Party, Ali was given a party card signed by Corbyn; in November, the local party voted by 17 to 14 to insist on Ali's membership "up to and including the point of disbandment of the party".

In the July 1982 edition of Briefing, Corbyn opposed expulsions of the Trotskyist and entryist group Militant, saying that "If expulsions are in order for Militant, they should apply to us too." In the same year, he was the "provisional convener" of "Defeat the Witch-Hunt Campaign", based at Corbyn's then address. The Metropolitan Police's Special Branch monitored Corbyn for two decades, until the early 2000s, as he was "deemed to be a subversive". According to the Labour Party, "The Security Services kept files on many peace and Labour movement campaigners at the time, including anti-Apartheid activists and trade unionists".

== Labour parliamentary backbencher (1983–2015) ==
=== Labour in opposition (1982–1997) ===
Corbyn was selected as the Labour Party candidate for the constituency of Islington North, in February 1982, winning the final ballot for selection by 39 votes against 35 for GLC councillor Paul Boateng, who in 1987 became one of the first three Black British Members of Parliament (MP). At the 1983 general election he was elected MP for the constituency, defeating the Independent Labour incumbent Michael O'Halloran, and immediately joined the socialist Campaign Group, later becoming secretary of the group.

Shortly after being elected to Parliament, he began writing a weekly column for the left-wing Morning Star newspaper. In May 2015, he said that "the Star is the most precious and only voice we have in the daily media". In February 2017, the Morning Star said of Corbyn: "He has been bullied, betrayed and ridiculed, and yet he carries on with the same grace and care he always shows to others – however objectionable their behaviour and treatment of him might be."

In 1983, Corbyn spoke on a "no socialism without gay liberation" platform and continued to campaign for LGBTQ rights.

He was a campaigner against apartheid in South Africa, serving on the National Executive of the Anti-Apartheid Movement, and was arrested in 1984 while demonstrating outside South Africa House, leading, decades later, to a viral image of Corbyn being arrested circulated by supporters on social media. This was as a member of the City of London Anti-Apartheid Group (CLAAG) who carried out a "non-stop picket" for 1,408 days to campaign for Nelson Mandela's release from prison. The Anti-Apartheid Movement did not support this protest, as they had agreed not to demonstrate within 30 feet of the embassy, and the picket failed to gain support from the London ANC; Mandela's failure to respond to CLAAG following his release from prison in 1990 is frequently described as a 'snub'.

He supported the 1984–85 miners' strike. In 1985, he invited striking miners into the gallery of the House of Commons; they were expelled for shouting: "Coal not dole". At the end of the strike Corbyn was given a medallion by the miners in recognition of his help.

In 1985, he was appointed national secretary of the newly launched Anti-Fascist Action.

During the BBC's Newsnight in 1984, Conservative MP Terry Dicks said that so-called Labour "scruffs" (such as Corbyn, who at this time was known for wearing an old polo-necked sweater to the Commons) should be banned from addressing the House of Commons unless they maintained higher standards. Corbyn responded by saying: "It's not a fashion parade, it's not a gentleman's club, it's not a bankers' institute, it's a place where the people are represented."

In 1990, Corbyn opposed the poll tax (formally known as the Community Charge) and nearly went to jail for not paying the tax. He appeared in court the following year as a result.

Corbyn – along with Amnesty International, Unison and a number of journalists and other MPs – supported the campaign to overturn the convictions of Jawad Botmeh and Samar Alami for the 1994 bombing of the Israeli Embassy in London, which argued that there was insufficient evidence to tie them to the act. Botmeh and Alami had admitted possessing explosives and guns but denied they were for use in Britain. The convictions were upheld by the High Court of Justice in 2001 and by the European Court of Human Rights in 2007.

Corbyn sat on the Social Security Select Committee from 1992 to 1997.

==== Irish politics ====
A longstanding supporter of a united Ireland, in the 1980s Corbyn met Sinn Féin leader Gerry Adams a number of times. Corbyn consistently stated that he maintained links with Sinn Fein in order to work for a resolution to the armed conflict. According to The Sunday Times, Corbyn was involved in over 72 events connected with Sinn Féin or other pro-republican groups during the period of the IRA's paramilitary campaign.

Corbyn met Adams at the 1983 and 1989 Labour conferences (facilitated by pro-IRA Red Action) and in 1983 at Westminster, along with a number of other Labour MPs. In 1984, Corbyn and Ken Livingstone invited Adams, two convicted IRA volunteers and other members of Sinn Féin to Westminster. He was criticised by the Labour Party leadership for the meeting, which took place two weeks after the IRA's bombing of the Conservative Party leadership that killed five people.

During the 1980s he campaigned on behalf of the Guildford Four and Birmingham Six, who were wrongly convicted of responsibility for IRA bombings in England in the mid-1970s. In 1986, Corbyn was arrested with 15 demonstrators protesting against what they saw as weak evidence and poor treatment during the trial of a group of IRA members including Patrick Magee, who was convicted of the Brighton hotel bombing and other attacks. After refusing police requests to move from outside the court, Corbyn and the other protesters were arrested for obstruction and held for five hours before being released on bail, but were not charged.

In 1987, Corbyn attended a commemoration by the Wolfe Tone Society in London's Conway Hall for eight IRA members who were killed by Special Air Service soldiers while attacking a Royal Ulster Constabulary station in Loughgall, County Armagh. At the commemoration, he told his fellow attendees that "I'm happy to commemorate all those who died fighting for an independent Ireland" and criticised the British government's policies in Northern Ireland along with calling for all British troops to be withdrawn from the region. Corbyn subsequently said that he had attended the event, which included a minute of silence for the eight IRA members, to "call for a peace and dialogue process".

He voted against the 1985 Anglo-Irish Agreement, saying: "We believe that the agreement strengthens rather than weakens the border between the six and the 26 counties, and those of us who wish to see a United Ireland oppose the agreement for that reason."

In the early 1990s, MI5 opened a file on Corbyn to monitor his links to the IRA.

In 1994, Corbyn signed a Commons motion condemning the 1974 Birmingham pub bombings, which killed 21 people.

A short time after IRA plans to bomb London were foiled in 1996, Corbyn invited Adams to the House of Commons for a press conference to promote Adams' autobiography, Before the Dawn. Shadow Northern Ireland Secretary Mo Mowlam and Labour leader Tony Blair condemned the invitation, with Mowlam arguing that it was detrimental to the peace process, and Blair threatening disciplinary action. Adams cancelled the event, to save further embarrassment to Corbyn and to avoid negative publicity.

In 1998, he voted for the Good Friday Agreement, saying that he looked forward to "peace, hope and reconciliation in Ireland in the future".

In 2017, Corbyn said that he had "never met the IRA", although Shadow Home Secretary Diane Abbott later clarified that although he had met members of the IRA, "he met with them in their capacity as activists in Sinn Fein".

=== Labour in government (1997–2010) ===
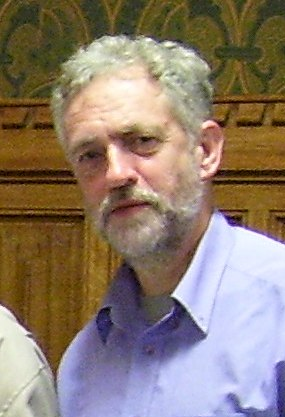
Corbyn in the House of Commons in 2006

Between 1997 and 2010, during the New Labour governments, Corbyn was the Labour MP who voted most often against the party whip, including three-line whip votes. In 2005 he was identified as the second most rebellious Labour MP of all time during the New Labour governments, behind Dennis Skinner. He was the most rebellious Labour MP in the 1997–2001 Parliament, the 2001–2005 Parliament and the 2005–2010 Parliament, defying the whip 428 times while Labour was in power. Jacobin described him as "a figure who for decades challenged them [Labour Party elites] from the backbench as one of the most rebellious left-wing members of parliament".

Corbyn has called for Tony Blair to be investigated for alleged war crimes during the Iraq War. In July 2016, the Chilcot Report of the Iraq Inquiry was issued, criticising Blair for joining the United States in the war against Iraq. Subsequently, Corbyn – who had voted against military action against Iraq – gave a speech in Westminster commenting: "I now apologise sincerely on behalf of my party for the disastrous decision to go to war in Iraq in March 2003" which he called an "act of military aggression launched on a false pretext" something that has "long been regarded as illegal by the overwhelming weight of international opinion". Corbyn specifically apologised to "the people of Iraq"; to the families of British soldiers who died in Iraq or returned injured; and to "the millions of British citizens who feel our democracy was traduced and undermined by the way in which the decision to go to war was taken on."

Corbyn sat on the London Regional Select Committee from 2009 to 2010.

==== Stop the War Coalition and anti-war activism ====
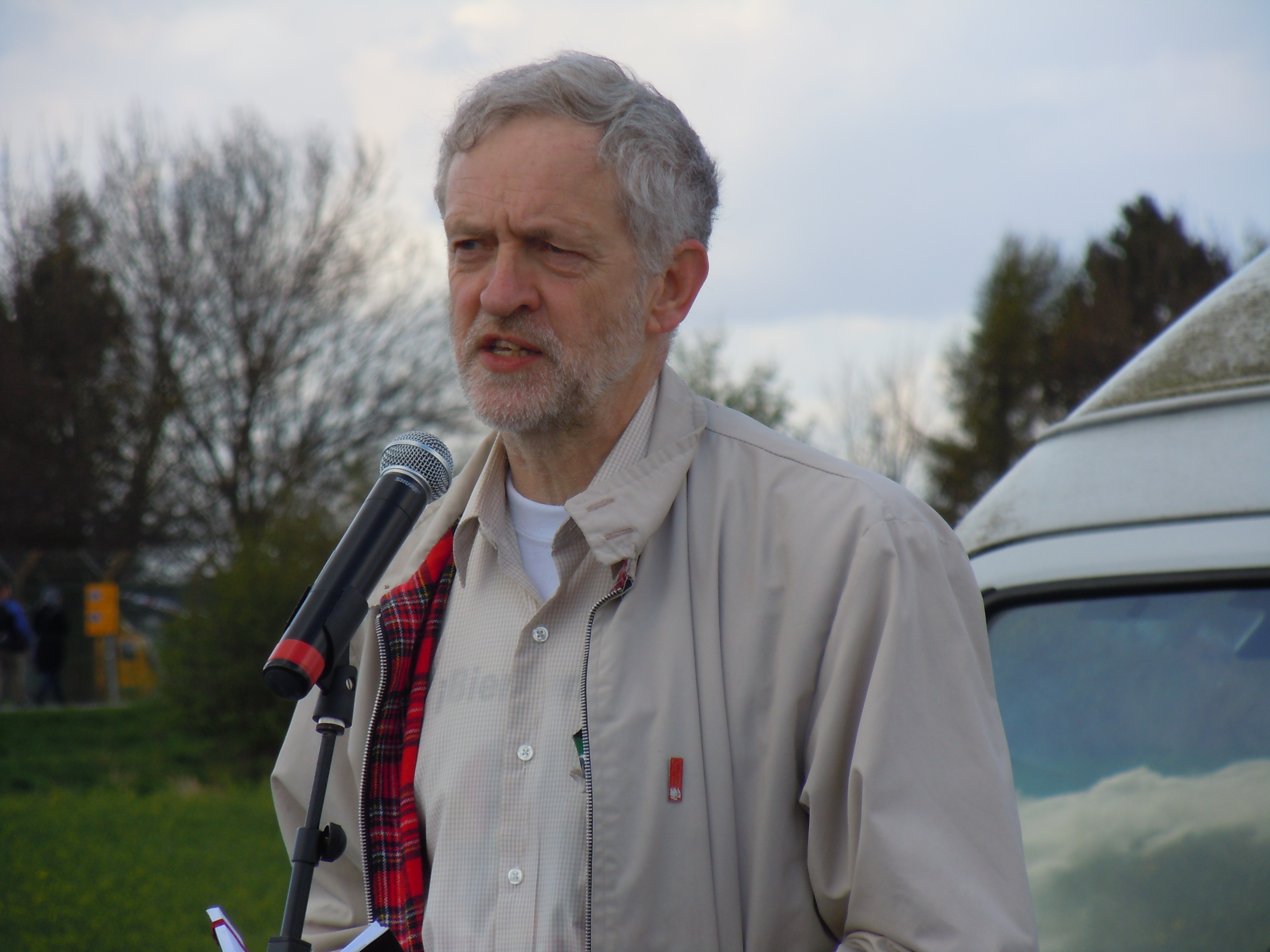
Corbyn speaking at an anti-drone strike rally organised by the Stop the War Coalition in 2013

In October 2001, Corbyn was elected to the steering committee of the Stop the War Coalition, which was formed to oppose the War in Afghanistan which started later that year. In 2002, Corbyn reported unrest : "there is disquiet...about issues of foreign policy" among some members of the Labour party. He cited "the deployment of troops to Afghanistan and the threat of bombing Iraq" as examples. He was vehemently opposed to Britain's involvement in the Iraq War in 2003, and spoke at dozens of anti-war rallies in Britain and overseas. He spoke at the February anti-Iraq War protest which was said to be the largest such protest in British political history. At the same time, he expressed support for the Iraqi insurgency and the Palestinian intifada when he signed the second Cairo Declaration in December 2003, which said "The Iraqis themselves are now engaged in a titanic struggle to rid their country of occupying forces. The Palestinian intifada continues under the most difficult circumstances. The US administration threatens Iran and other countries on a daily basis. Now is the time to draw together the forces of resistance in the Arab world and from around the globe."

In 2004, Corbyn travelled to Israel with anti-war activist Betty Papworth to witness the release of the Israeli peace activist and whistle-blower Mordechai Vanunu from prison.

In 2006, Corbyn was one of 12 Labour MPs to support Plaid Cymru and the Scottish National Party's call for a parliamentary inquiry into the Iraq War. He was elected chair of the coalition in succession to Andrew Murray in September 2011, but resigned once he became Leader of the Labour Party in September 2015.

==== Parliamentary groups and activism ====
Corbyn is a member of a number of Parliamentary Trade Union Groups: he is sponsored by several trade unions, including UNISON, Unite and the National Union of Rail, Maritime and Transport Workers. He is a supporter of the Unite Against Fascism pressure group. Corbyn was chair of the All-Party Parliamentary Group (APPG) on the Chagos Islands, chair of the APPG on Mexico, Vice-Chair of the APPG on Latin America and vice-chair of the APPG on Human Rights. He has advocated for the rights of the forcibly removed Chagossians to return to the British Indian Ocean Territory.

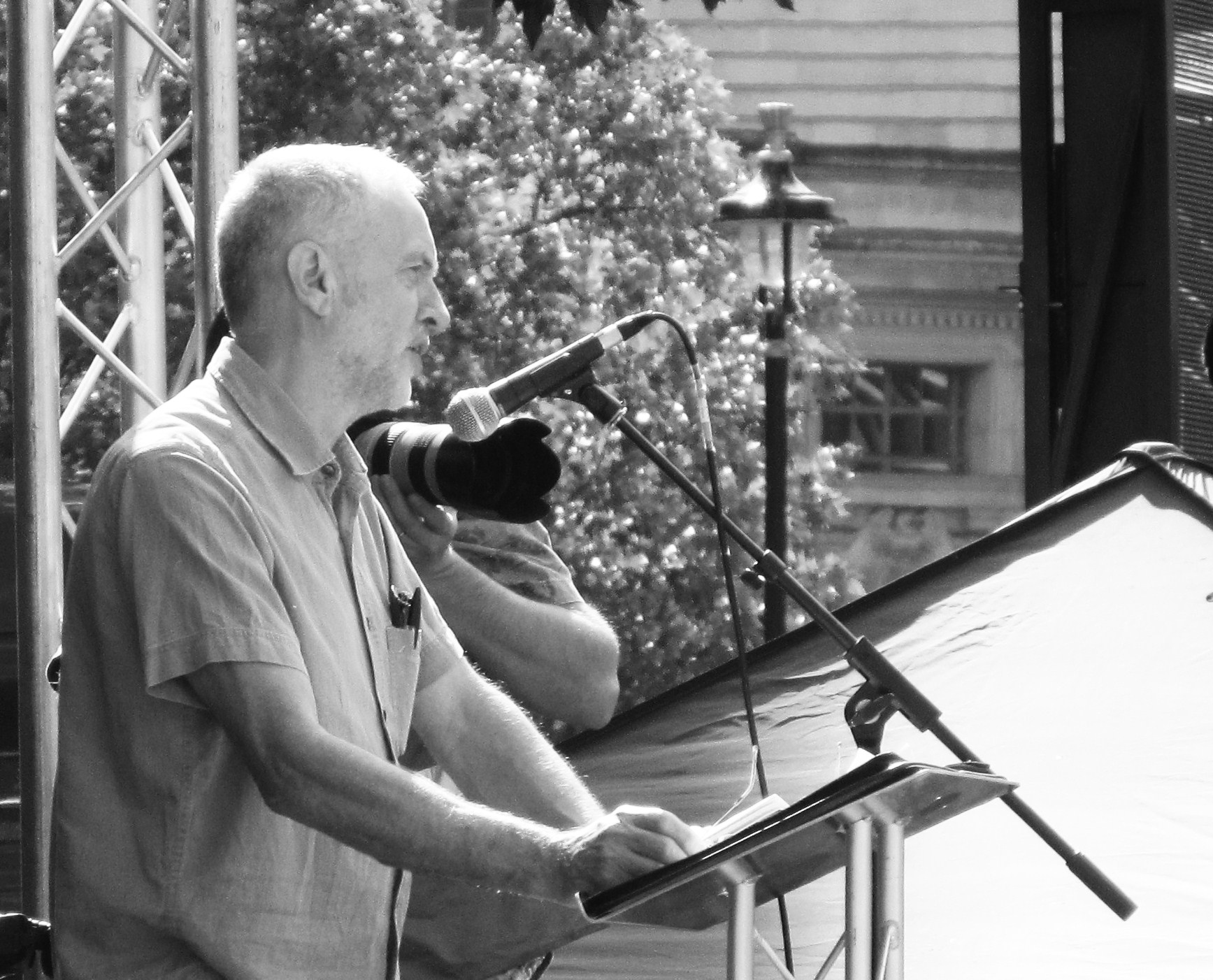
Corbyn addressing London's People's Assembly Demonstration in June 2014

Corbyn appeared on a call-in show on Press TV, an Iranian government television channel, several times between 2009 and 2012. He was criticised for appearing on the channel in light of Iran executing and imprisoning homosexuals, as well as Corbyn not questioning contributors who called the BBC "Zionist liars" and described Israel as a "disease". Corbyn said in response that he used the programme to address "human rights issues" and that his appearance fee was "not an enormous amount" and was used to help meet constituency office costs. Corbyn's final appearance was six months after the network was fined by Ofcom for its part in filming an interview with Maziar Bahari, an Iranian journalist, saying the interview had been held under duress and after torture.

=== Labour in opposition (2010–2015) ===
In the 2010 Labour Party leadership election, Corbyn supported Diane Abbott in the first round in which she was eliminated; thereafter, he supported Ed Miliband.

Corbyn was one of 16 signatories to an open letter to Ed Miliband in January 2015 calling for Labour to make a commitment to opposing further austerity, to take rail franchises back into public ownership, and to strengthen collective bargaining arrangements.

Corbyn sat on the Justice Select Committee from 2010 to 2015. Before becoming party leader Corbyn had been returned as member of Parliament for Islington North seven times, gaining 60.24% of the vote and a majority of 21,194 in the 2015 general election.

=== Leadership elections ===
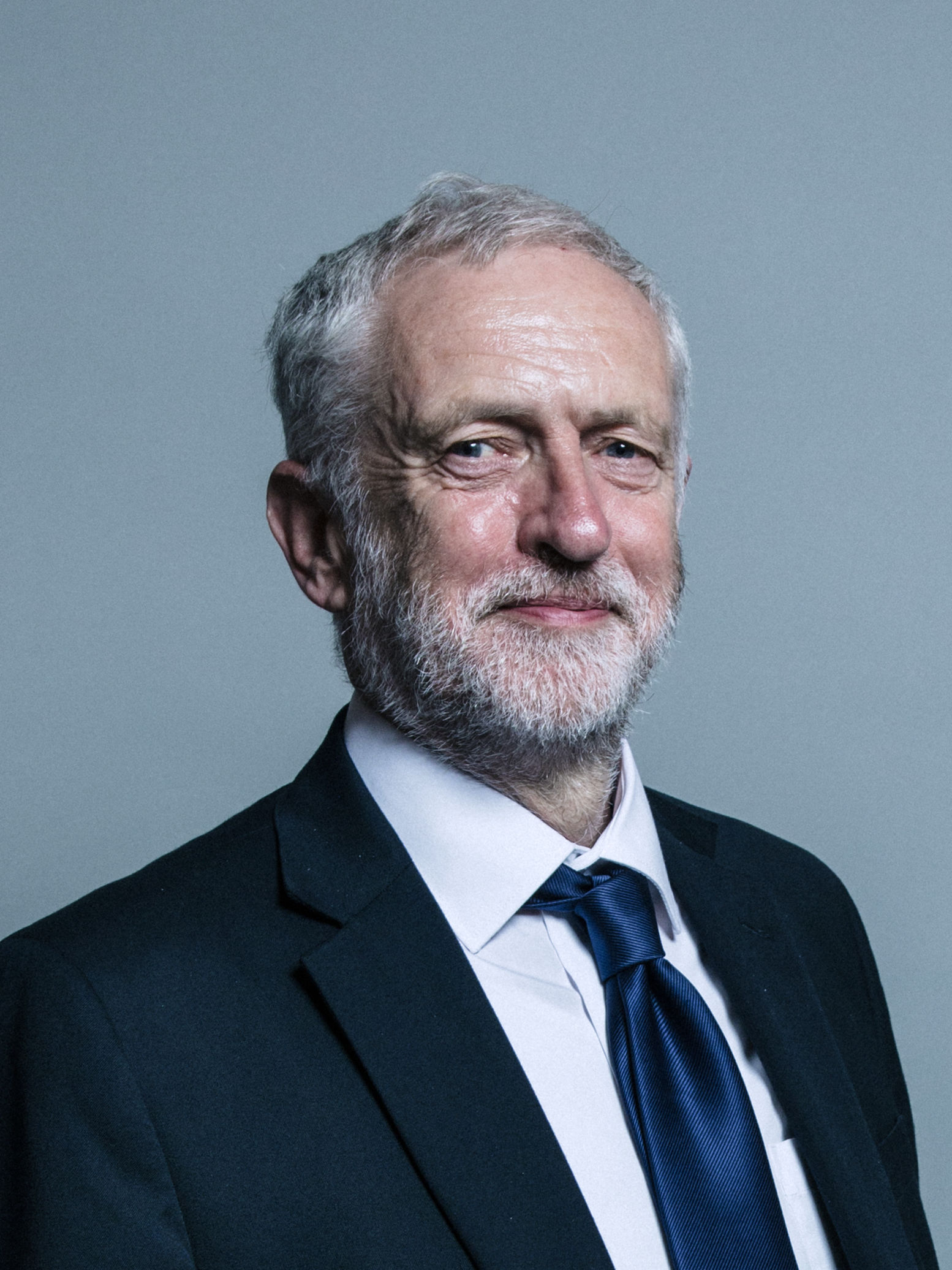
Official portrait, 2017

Following the Labour Party's defeat at the general election on 7 May 2015, Ed Miliband resigned as party leader, triggering a leadership election. Corbyn decided to stand as a candidate, having been disillusioned by the lack of a left-wing voice, and said to his local newspaper, the Islington Tribune, that he would have a "clear anti-austerity platform". He also said he would vote to scrap the Trident nuclear weapons system and would "seek to withdraw from NATO". He suggested that Britain should establish a national investment bank to boost house-building and improve economic growth and lift wages in areas that had less investment in infrastructure. He would also aim to eliminate the current budget deficit over time and restore the 50p top rate of income tax. He added: "This decision is in response to an overwhelming call by Labour Party members who want to see a broader range of candidates and a thorough debate about the future of the party. I am standing to give Labour Party members a voice in this debate". He indicated that, if he were elected, policies that he put forward would need to be approved by party members before being adopted and that he wanted to "implement the democratic will of our party". The other candidates were Shadow Home Secretary Yvette Cooper, Shadow Health Secretary Andy Burnham and Shadow Care Minister Liz Kendall. Several who nominated Corbyn later said they had ensured he had enough votes to stand, more to widen the political debate within the party than because of a desire or expectation that he would win.

At the Second Reading of the Welfare Reform and Work Bill in July 2015, Corbyn joined 47 Labour MPs to oppose the Bill, describing it as "rotten and indefensible", while the other three leadership candidates abstained under direction from interim leader Harriet Harman. In August 2015, he called on Iain Duncan Smith to resign as Secretary of State for Work and Pensions after it was reported that thousands of disabled people had died after being found fit to work by Work Capability Assessments (instituted in 2008) between 2011 and 2014, although this was challenged by the government and by FullFact who said that the figure included those who had died and therefore their claim had ended, rather than being found fit for work.

Corbyn rapidly became the frontrunner among the candidates and was perceived to benefit from a large influx of new members. Hundreds of supporters turned out to hear him speak at the hustings across the nation and their enthusiastic reception and support for him was dubbed "Corbynmania" by the press. Membership numbers continued to climb after the start of his leadership. In addition, following a rule change under Miliband, members of the public who supported Labour's aims and values could join the party as "registered supporters" for £3 and be entitled to vote in the election. There was speculation that the rule change would lead to Corbyn being elected by registered supporters without majority support from ordinary members. He was elected party leader in a landslide victory on 12 September 2015 with 59.5% of first-preference votes in the first round of voting. He would have won in the first round with 51% of votes, even without "£3 registered supporters", having gained the support of 49.6% of full members and 57.6% of affiliated supporters. His 40.5% majority was a larger proportional majority than that attained by Tony Blair in 1994. His margin of victory was said to be "the largest mandate ever won by a party leader".

An internal Labour Party report, entitled The work of the Labour Party's Governance and Legal Unit in relation to antisemitism, 2014–2019, was leaked to the media in April 2020. The report stated that during the 2015 and 2016 leadership contests, staff members at Labour party headquarters looked for ways to exclude from voting members who they believed would vote for Corbyn. The staff members referred to this activity as "trot busting", "bashing trots" and "trot spotting".

==== Corbynmania ====
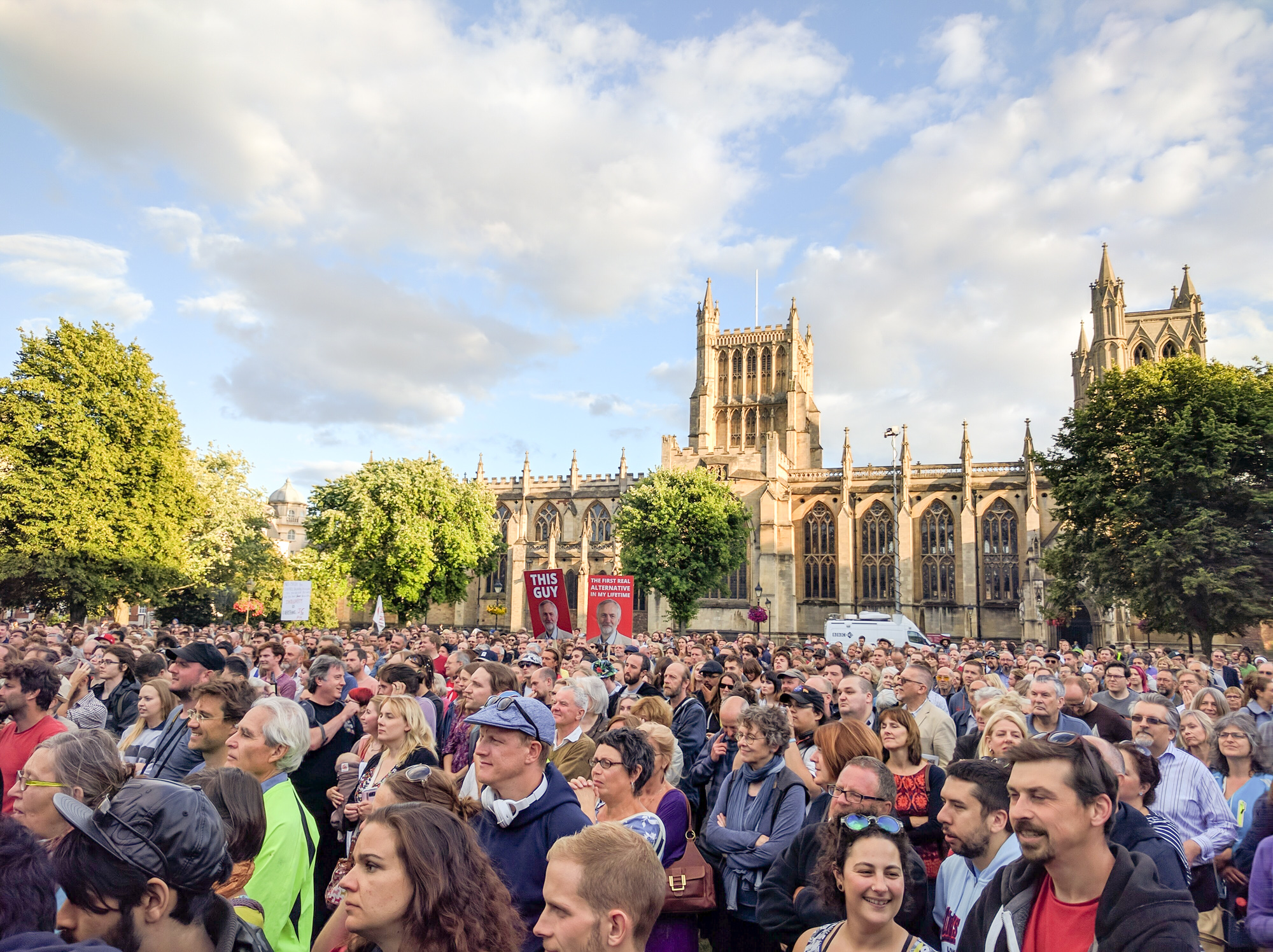
A rally in Bristol during Corbyn's leadership campaign in 2016. Corbyn returned to College Green in 2019 for an election rally but his reception was then less enthusiastic.

Corbyn was initially viewed as a token candidate for the left wing of the party and not expected to win. However, many new, young party members, who had joined after the membership fee had been reduced to £3, were attracted by what they saw as Corbyn's authentic, informal style and radical policies. Hundreds of supporters turned out to hear him speak at the hustings across the nation and their enthusiastic reception and support for him was dubbed "Corbynmania" by the press.

Jonathan Dean characterised Corbynmania as a political fandom, comparable with the enthusiastic followings of popular media stars and other modern politicians such as Bernie Sanders and Justin Trudeau. Specific features included use of the #jezwecan hashtag, attendance at rallies and the posting of pictures such as selfies on social media. Artistic, merchandising and other activity consolidated and spread this fannish enthusiasm. This included a "Jeremy Corbyn for Prime Minister" (JC4PM) tour by celebrities such as Charlotte Church, Jeremy Hardy and Maxine Peake; a Corbyn superhero comic book; mash-ups and videos. Many of Corbyn's supporters felt he possessed personal qualities such as earnestness and modesty leading them to develop a sense of emotional attachment to him as individual. These were seen as cultish by critics such as Margaret Beckett who said in 2016 that the Labour Party had been turned into the "Jeremy Corbyn Fan Club".

A chant of "Oh, Jeremy Corbyn" was adopted as an anthem or chorus by his supporters. Sung in the style of a football chant to the tune of a riff from "Seven Nation Army" by The White Stripes, it attracted special attention at the Glastonbury Festival 2017, where Corbyn appeared and spoke to the crowds. Labour's weaker-than-expected performance in the 2018 local elections led to suggestions that Corbynmania had peaked.

== Leadership of the Labour Party (2015–2020) ==
=== First term as Leader of the Opposition (2015–2017) ===
After being elected leader, Corbyn became Leader of the Official Opposition and shortly thereafter his appointment to the Privy Council was announced. In Corbyn's first Prime Minister's Questions session as leader, he broke with the traditional format by asking the Prime Minister six questions he had received from members of the public, the result of his invitation to Labour Party members to send suggestions, for which he received around 40,000 emails. Corbyn stressed his desire to reduce the "theatrical" nature of the House of Commons, and his début was described in a Guardian editorial as "a good start" and a "long overdue" change to the tone of PMQs. He delivered his first Labour Party Conference address as leader on 29 September 2015. Party membership nearly doubled between the May 2015 election and October 2015, attributed largely to the election as leader of Corbyn.

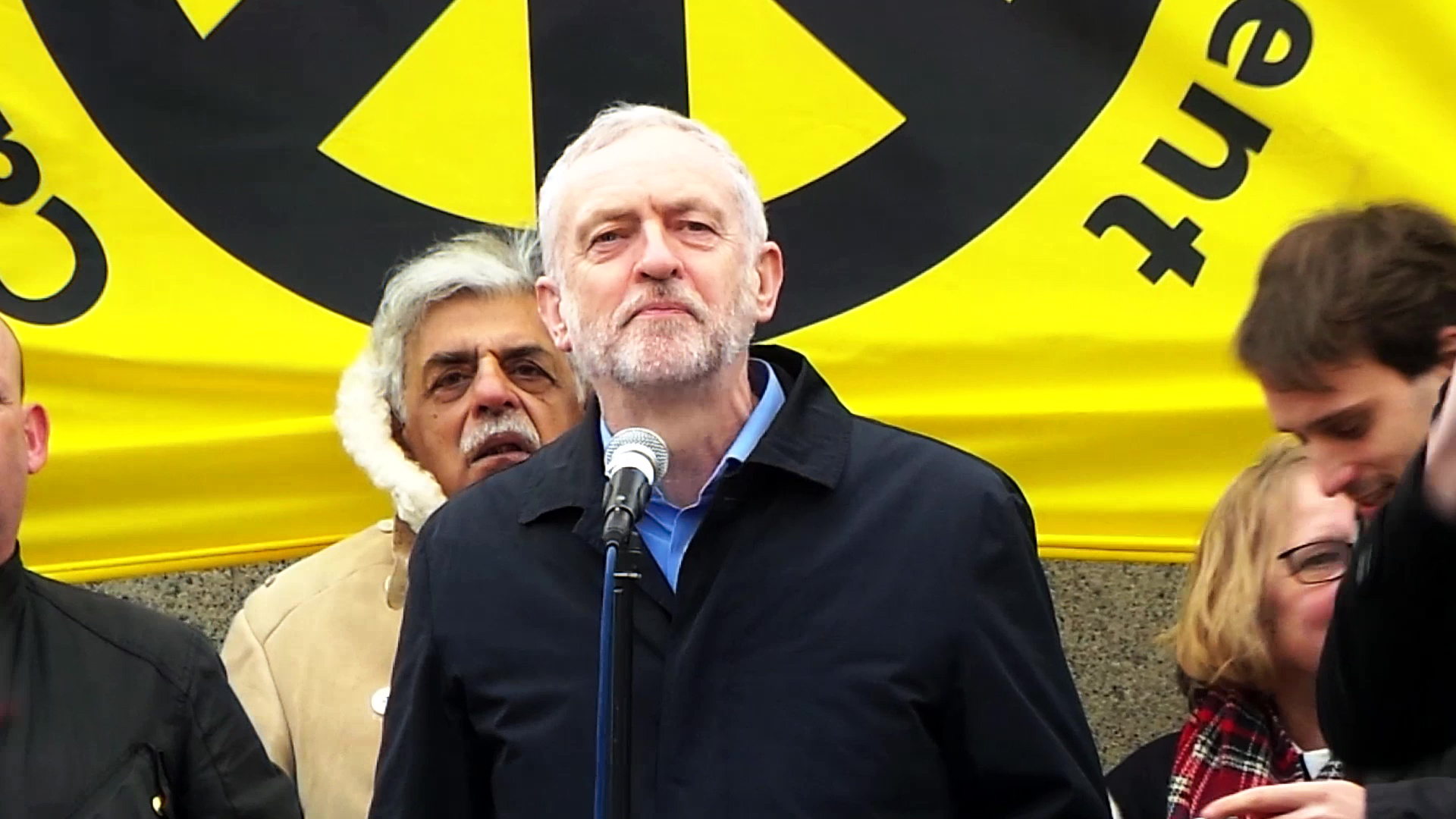
Corbyn speaking at the #StopTrident rally at Trafalgar Square on 27 February 2016

In September 2015, an unnamed senior serving general in the British Army stated that a mutiny by the Army could occur if a future Corbyn government moved to scrap Trident, pull out of NATO or reduce the size of the armed forces. The general said "the Army just wouldn't stand for it. The general staff would not allow a prime minister to jeopardise the security of this country and I think people would use whatever means possible, fair or foul to prevent that. You can't put a maverick in charge of a country's security".

In July 2016, a study and analysis by academics from the London School of Economics of national newspaper articles about Corbyn in the first months of his leadership of Labour showed that 75% of them either distorted or failed to represent his actual views on subjects.

=== 2017 general election ===
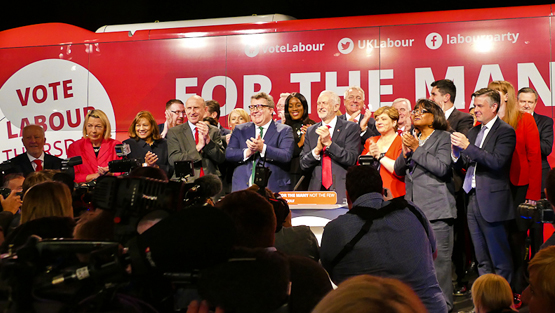
Corbyn with members of his Shadow Cabinet in EventCity, Greater Manchester, at the Labour Party 2017 General Election Launch

The Labour campaign in the 2017 general election focused on social issues such as health care, education and ending austerity. Corbyn's election campaign was run under the slogan "For the Many, Not the Few" and featured rallies with a large audience and connected with a grassroots following for the party, including appearing on stage in front of a crowd of 20,000 at the Wirral Live Festival in Prenton Park.

Although Labour started the campaign as far as 20 points behind, and again finished as the second largest party in parliament, it increased its share of the popular vote to 40%, resulting in a net gain of 30 seats and a hung parliament. This was its greatest vote share since 2001. It was the first time Labour had made a net gain of seats since 1997, and the party's 9.6% increase in vote share was its largest in a single general election since 1945. This was partly attributed to the popularity of its 2017 Manifesto that promised to scrap tuition fees, address public sector pay, make housing more affordable, end austerity, nationalise the railways and provide school students with free lunches.

=== 2019 general election and resignation ===
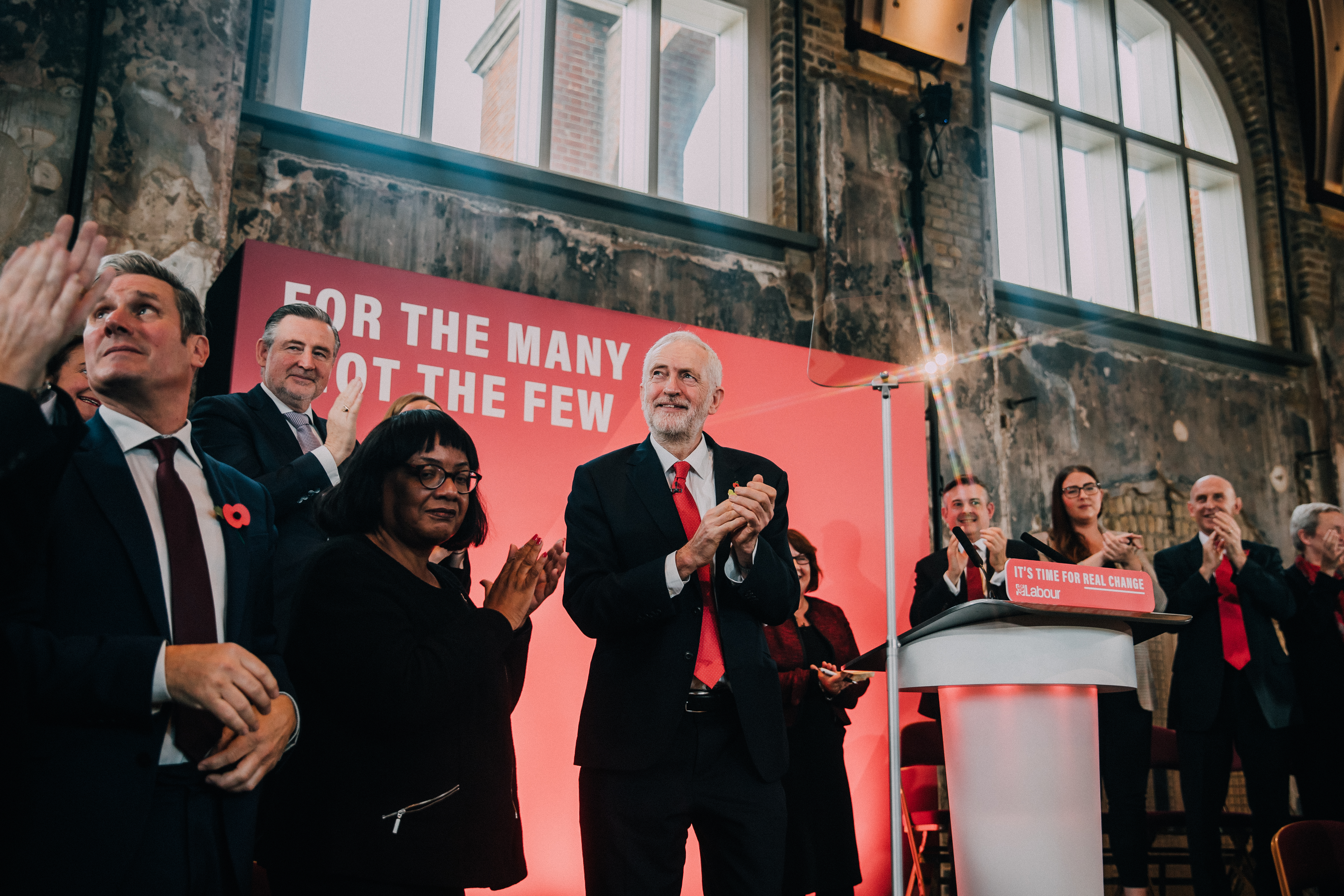
Corbyn launching the Labour Party's 2019 general election campaign

In May 2019, Theresa May announced her resignation and stood down as prime minister in July, following the election of her replacement, former Foreign Secretary Boris Johnson. Corbyn said that Labour was ready to fight an election against Johnson.

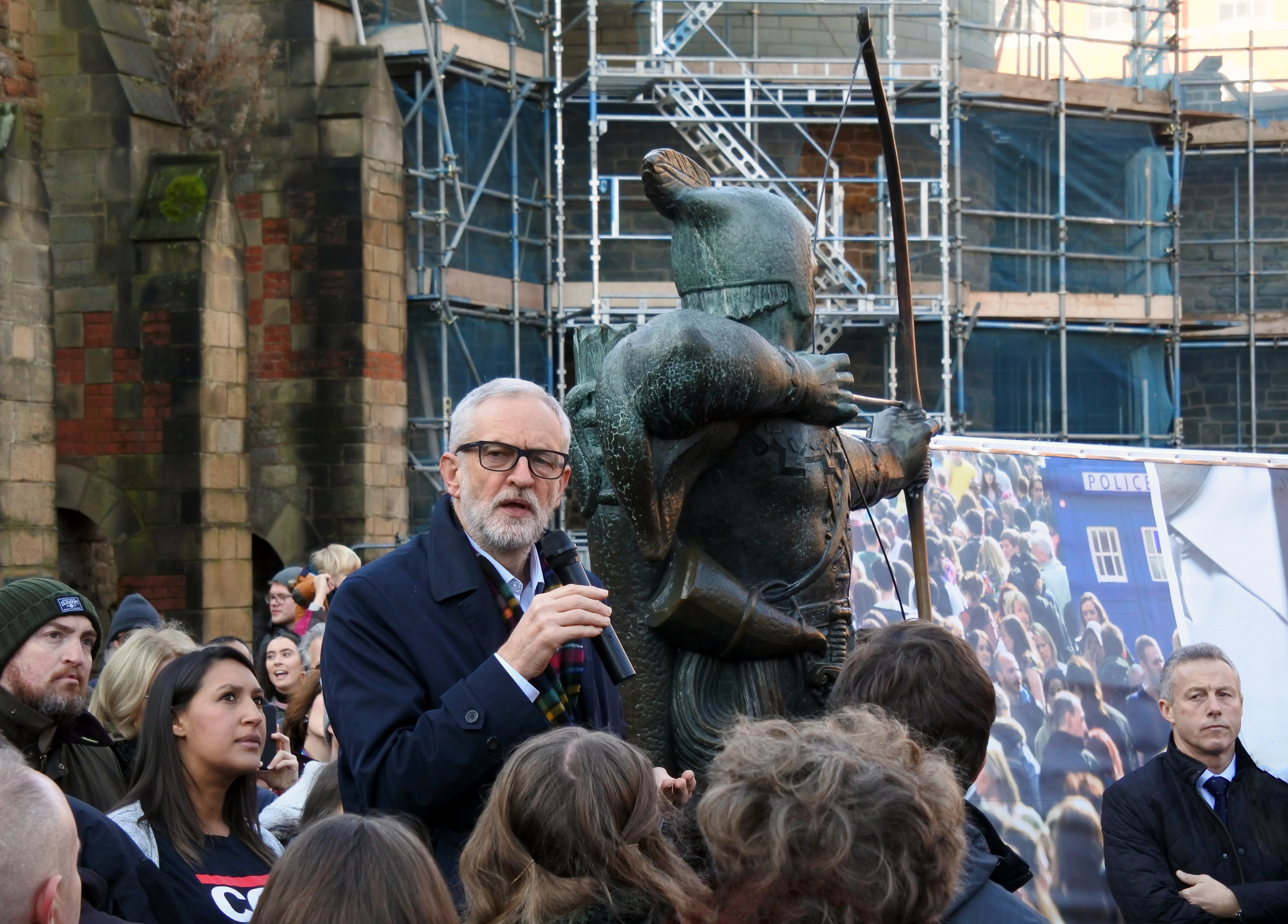
Corbyn campaigning in the 2019 general election at Nottingham Castle

The 2019 Labour Party Manifesto included policies to increase funding for health, negotiate a Brexit deal and hold a referendum giving a choice between the deal and remain, raise the minimum wage, stop the pension age increase, nationalise key industries, and replace universal credit. Due to the plans to nationalise the "big six" energy firms, the National Grid, the water industry, Royal Mail, the railways and the broadband arm of BT, the 2019 manifesto was widely considered as the most radical in several decades, more closely resembling Labour's politics of the 1970s than subsequent decades.

The 2019 general election was the worst defeat in seats for Labour since 1935, with Labour winning just 202 out of 650 seats, their fourth successive election defeat. At 32.2%, Labour's share of the vote was down around eight points on the 2017 general election and is lower than that achieved by Neil Kinnock in 1992, although it was higher than in 2010 and 2015. In the aftermath, opinions differed to why the Labour Party was defeated to the extent it was. The Shadow Chancellor John McDonnell largely blamed Brexit and the media representation of the party. Tony Blair argued that the party's unclear position on Brexit and the economic policy pursued by the Corbyn leadership were to blame.

Following the Labour Party's unsuccessful performance in the 2019 general election, Corbyn conceded defeat and stated that he intended to step down as leader following the election of a successor and that he would not lead the party into the next election. Corbyn himself was re-elected for Islington North with 64.3% of the vote share and a majority of 26,188 votes over the runner-up candidate representing the Liberal Democrats, with Labour's share of the vote falling by 8.7%. The Guardian described the results as a "realignment" of UK politics as the Conservative landslide took many traditionally Labour seats in England and Wales. Corbyn insisted that he had "pride in the manifesto" that Labour put forward and blamed the defeat on Brexit. According to polling by the Conservative peer Lord Ashcroft, Corbyn was himself a major contributor to the party's defeat. Corbyn remained Labour leader for four months while the leadership election to replace him took place. His resignation as Labour leader formally took effect in April 2020 following the election of Keir Starmer.

== Independent MP (2020–2025) ==
=== EHRC report and suspension ===
On 29 October 2020, a report by the Equalities and Human Rights Commission into antisemitism in the Labour Party was published, finding that the party was responsible for unlawful acts of harassment and discrimination. In response to the report, Corbyn said that while antisemitism was "absolutely abhorrent" and that "one anti-Semite [in the Labour Party] is one too many", he said that "the scale of the problem was also dramatically overstated for political reasons by our opponents inside and outside the party, as well as by much of the media". He further said that "the public perception in an opinion poll last year was that one third of all Labour party members were somehow or other under suspicion of antisemitism. The reality is, it was 0.3 per cent of party members had a case against them which had to be put through the process." A fact check by Channel 4 News noted that Corbyn's "0.3 per cent" claim was likely based on an estimate provided by Labour General Secretary Jennie Formby during her investigation and first published in a 2019 study co-authored by media scholar Greg Philo. Corbyn's claim that "one-third" of party members were believed to be involved in antisemitism complaints by the public likely originated in a Survation poll of 1,009 people conducted in 2019, in which the average perception of respondents familiar with the issue was that 34% of party members were involved in antisemitism complaints; this number is over 300 times the estimate of antisemitism cases arrived at by Formby's actual investigation.

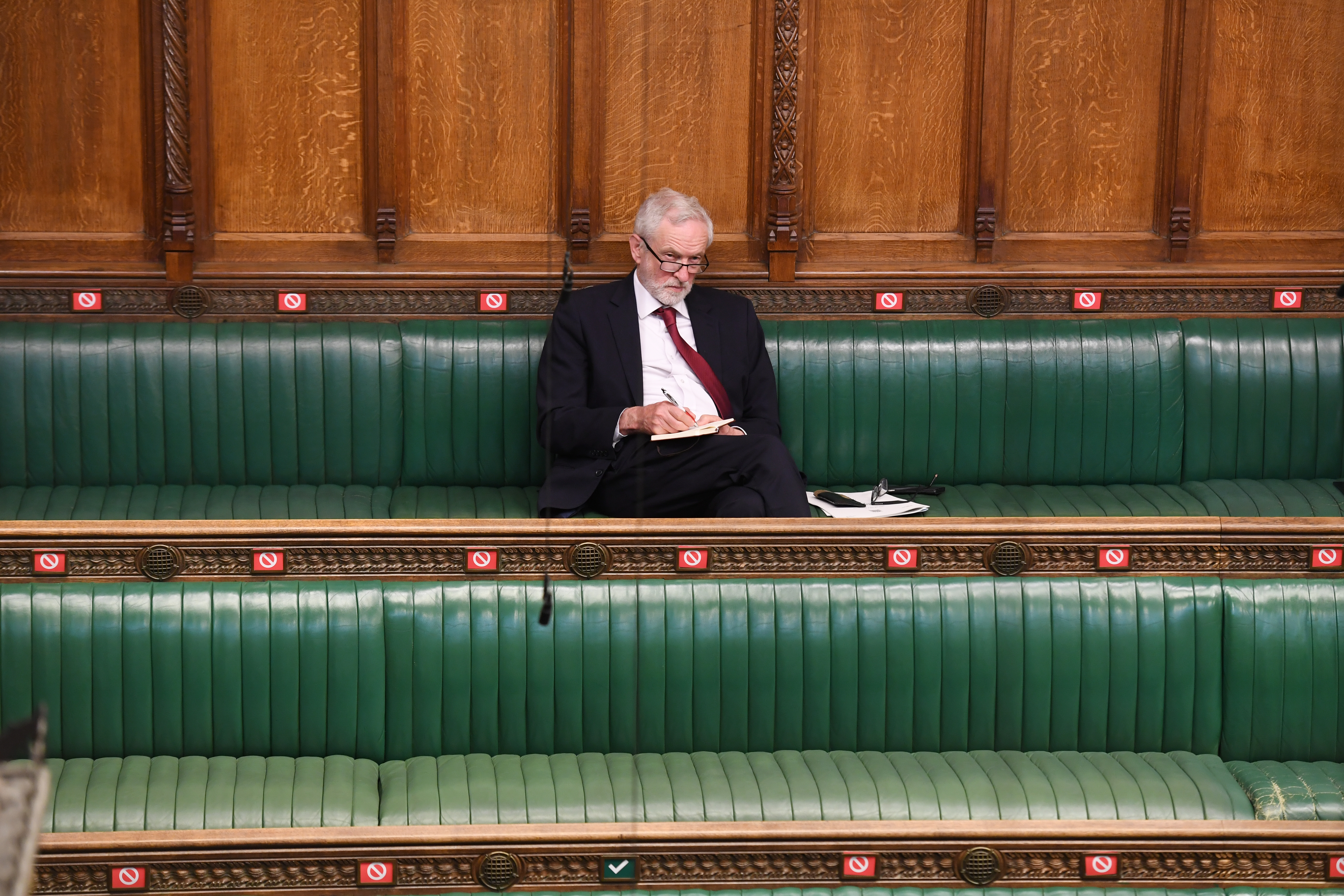
Corbyn sits on the backbenches in his first Prime Minister's Questions since his resignation as Labour leader, 22 April 2020

In his press conference around half an hour after Corbyn's statement, Starmer said that anyone who thought the problems were "exaggerated" or were a "factional attack" were "part of the problem and... should be nowhere near the Labour Party". Corbyn defended his comments in a TV interview later that day; shortly after it aired, the Labour Party announced that it had suspended Corbyn pending an investigation. Corbyn's suspension was welcomed by Labour figures including Margaret Hodge, and Harriet Harman, as well as by the Board of Deputies of British Jews. Corbyn stated he would "strongly contest" his suspension. John McDonnell, Unite leader Len McCluskey, and Momentum expressed opposition to Corbyn's suspension.

=== Peace and Justice Project ===
On 13 December 2020, Corbyn announced the Project for Peace and Justice. Corbyn launched the project on 17 January 2021, and its affiliates include Christine Blower, Len McCluskey and Zarah Sultana. Rafael Correa said that he "welcome[d] the creation" of the project.

=== Stop the War Coalition statement on Ukraine crisis ===
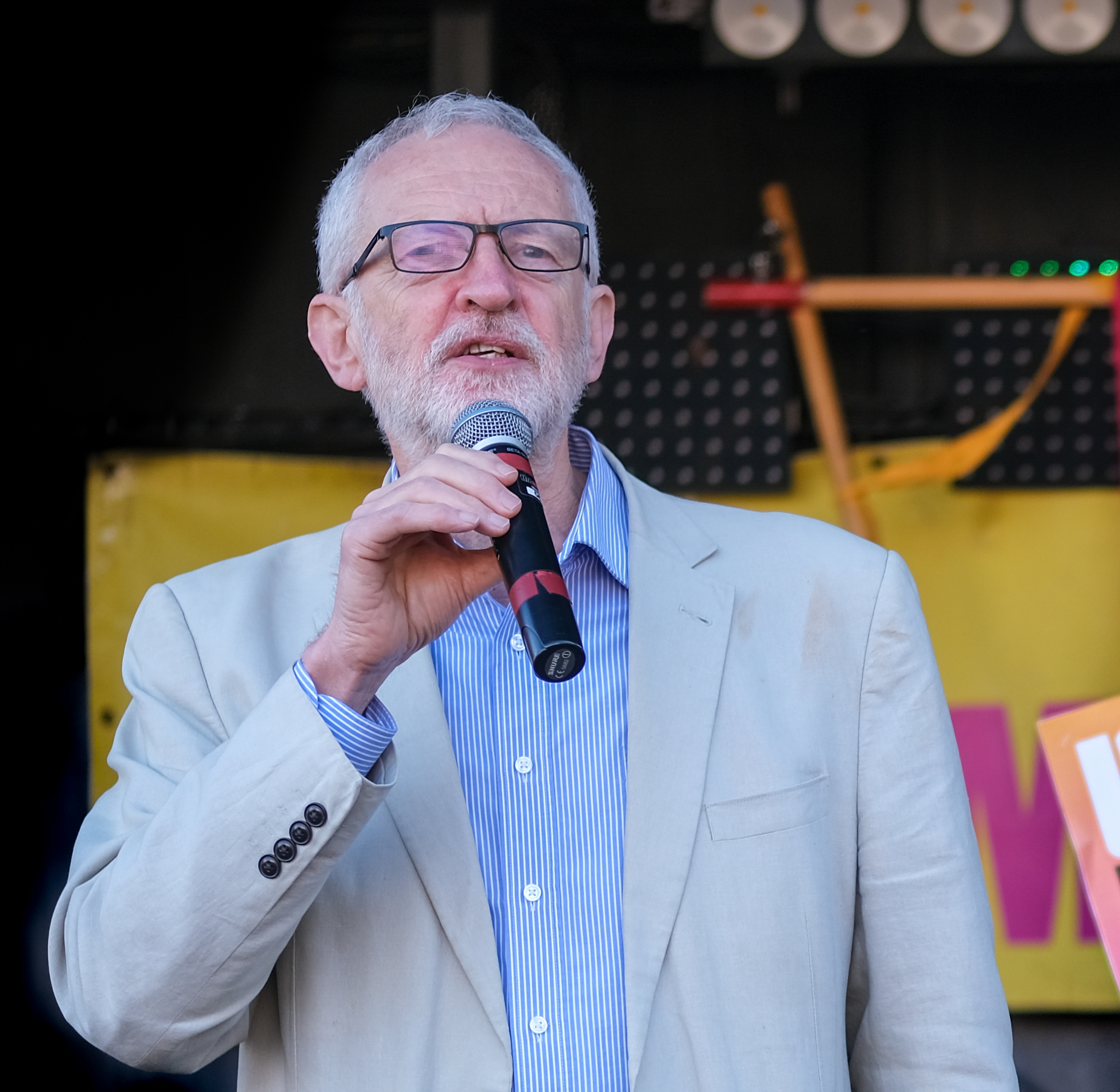
Corbyn addresses the March Against Racism in Parliament Square, March 2022

On 18 February 2022, in the week before the Russian invasion of Ukraine, Corbyn alongside 11 Labour MPs cosigned a statement from the Stop the War Coalition opposing any war in Ukraine. The statement said that "the crisis should be settled on a basis which recognises the right of the Ukrainian people to self-determination and addresses Russia's security concerns", that NATO "should call a halt to its eastward expansion", and that the British government's sending of arms to Ukraine and troops to eastern Europe served "no purpose other than inflaming tensions and indicating disdain for Russian concerns". The statement's authors also said that they "refute the idea that NATO is a defensive alliance".

On the evening of 24 February, the first day of the invasion, Labour chief whip Alan Campbell wrote to all 11 Labour MPs who had signed the statement, requesting that they withdraw their signatures. All 11 agreed to do so the same evening. Corbyn and fellow former Labour independent MP Claudia Webbe did not withdraw their signatures from the statement, though David Lammy urged Corbyn to do so.

=== Expulsion from the Labour Party and 2024 general election ===
Media speculation that Corbyn would contest the 2024 general election as an independent was reported in October 2023. Despite "unanimous support" from his Constituency Labour Party (CLP), Corbyn was not permitted to stand as a Labour parliamentary candidate. After announcing on 24 May 2024 that he would stand as an independent parliamentary candidate for Islington North, he was fully expelled from the Labour Party. He was endorsed by Mick Lynch of the National Union of Rail, Maritime and Transport Workers.

Corbyn responded to Keir Starmer's claim of knowing the party would lose the 2019 election by saying: "Well, he never said that to me, at any time. And so I just think rewriting history is no help. It shows double standards, shall we say, that he now says he always thought that but he never said it at the time or anything about it. He was part of the campaign. He and I spoke together at events and I find it actually quite sad."

Leading members of the Islington North CLP resigned in order to support Corbyn, while also criticising the manner in which Praful Nargund was selected as the Labour candidate. Corbyn was comfortably re-elected as an independent, even as Labour won a landslide victory in the general election. His majority over Nargund was more than 7,000.

== Founding of Your Party (2025) ==
In September 2024, Corbyn formed a parliamentary group, the Independent Alliance, with four independent Muslim MPs who were elected on pro-Gaza platforms. In December 2024, The Spectator said that the Independent Alliance was likely to form a political party in 2025. According to The Spectator, three of the members, Shockat Adam, Adnan Hussain and Ayoub Khan, were in favour of the creation of a political party to build momentum, but Corbyn was more hesitant.

Zarah Sultana, who was first elected as a Labour MP in 2019 and re-elected in 2024 but subsequently had had the whip suspended, announced in July 2025 that she was leaving Labour and planned to create a new political party with Corbyn and other independents. On 24 July 2025, Corbyn and Sultana launched a website with the interim name "Your Party" and invited supporters to sign up for information and attend an inaugural conference. In less than a week, the website's newsletter had received more than 600,000 sign-ups.

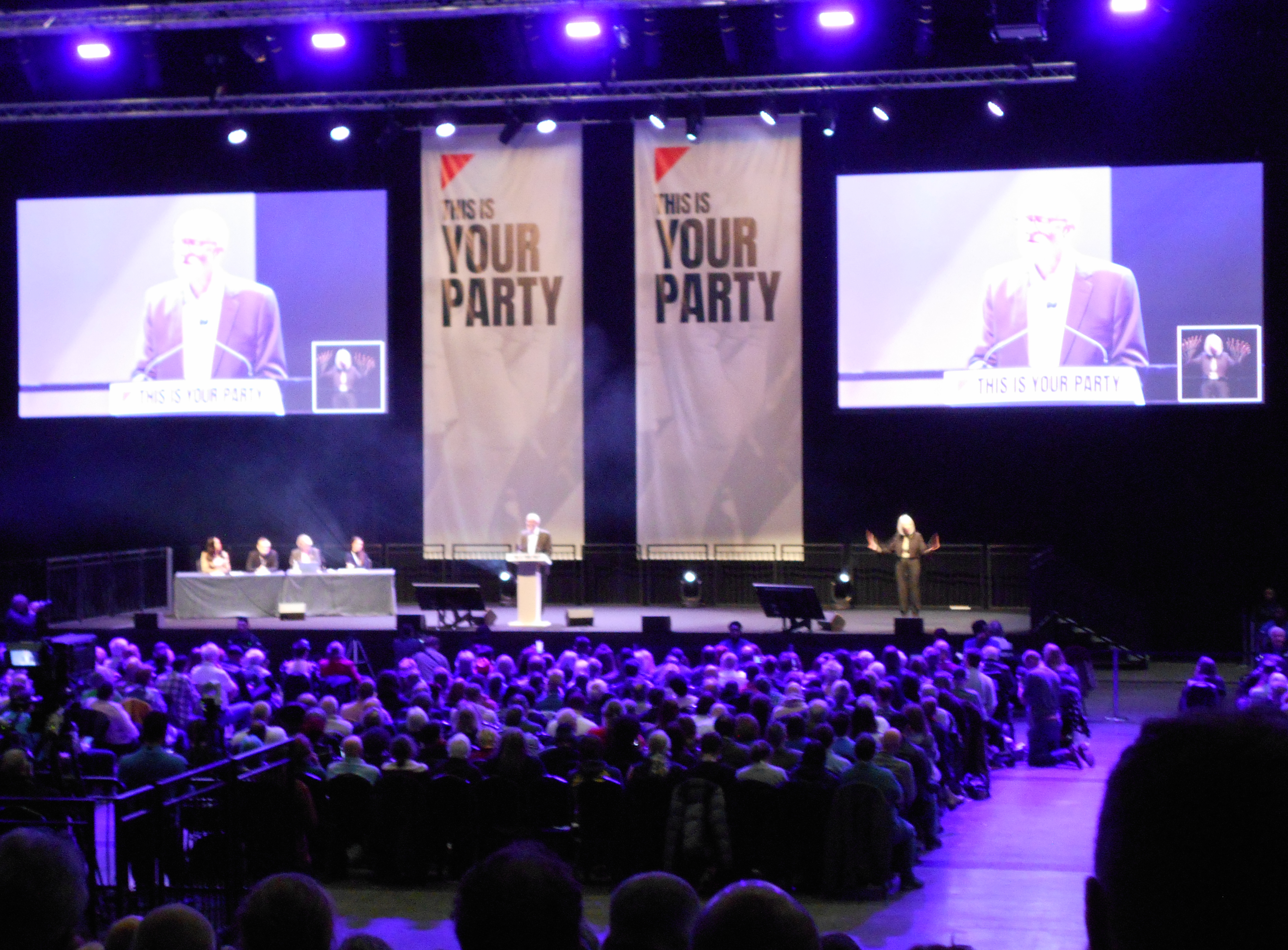
Jeremy Corbyn speaking at the inaugural conference of Your Party on 29 November 2025

Tensions emerged between Corbyn and Sultana after Sultana launched a membership portal on 18 September. Corbyn and other members of the Independent Alliance called the portal "unauthorised" and accused Sultana of unilaterally launching the membership system. In response, Sultana accused Corbyn of overseeing a "sexist boys' club".

On 24 September, Corbyn launched the party's official membership portal, and Sultana reaffirmed she was a member of Your Party, later saying she had reconciled with Corbyn, and comparing her relationship with Corbyn to that of Oasis's Gallagher brothers. At the party's inaugural conference in November, "Your Party" was formally adopted as the party's name, and members voted to adopt a collective leadership model over a single-leader model, which was favoured by Corbyn.

In February 2026, Corbyn was elected by party members to the party's Central Executive Committee (CEC) as a public office holder. Candidates endorsed by the Corbyn-aligned "The Many" slate won a majority of 14 out of 24 seats on the CEC. On 8 March 2026, Corbyn was elected as the party's parliamentary leader by the CEC.

In September 2026, Corbyn, along with Diane Abbott and all 5 Green Party MPs, was banned from entering Israel.

== Policies and views ==
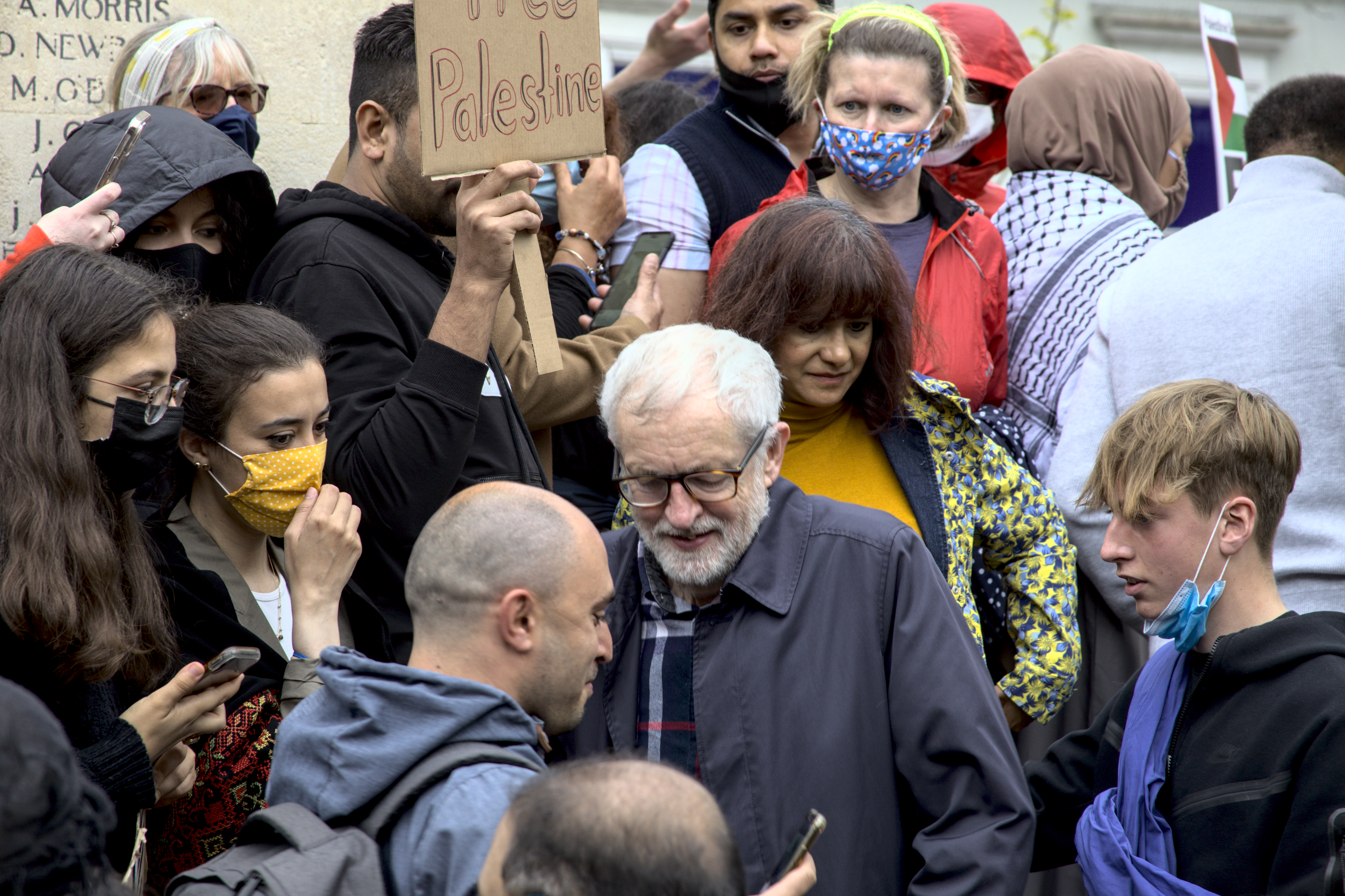
Corbyn at a march for Palestine in Oxford in 2021

Corbyn self-identifies as a socialist. He has also been referred to as a "mainstream [Scandinavian] social democrat". He advocates reversing austerity cuts to public services and some welfare funding made since 2010, as well as renationalisation of public utilities and the railways. A longstanding anti-war and anti-nuclear activist, he supports a foreign policy of military non-interventionism and unilateral nuclear disarmament, and has been a prominent activist for Palestinian solidarity throughout the Gaza–Israel conflict. Writer Ronan Bennett, who formerly worked as a research assistant to Corbyn, has described him as "a kind of vegan, pacifist idealist, one with a clear understanding of politics and history, and a commitment to the underdog".

In 1997, the political scientists David Butler and Dennis Kavanagh described Corbyn's political stance as "far-left". Corbyn has described Karl Marx as a "great economist" and said he has read some of the works of Adam Smith, Marx and David Ricardo and has "looked at many, many others". However, some have argued that Corbyn is less radical than previously described: for example, the journalist George Eaton has called him "Keynesian". In 2023, The Daily Telegraph reported that most of the tax policies in Corbyn's 2019 general election manifesto had been implemented by the winning Conservative government, including a higher corporation tax, a windfall tax on oil companies, a reduction in annual tax allowances on dividend income, raising income tax on high earners, and introducing a digital services tax on online retailers.

Corbyn named John Smith as the former Labour leader whom he most admired, describing him as "a decent, nice, inclusive leader". He also said he was "very close and very good friends" with Michael Foot.

=== Allegations of antisemitism ===
Allegations of antisemitism within the party grew during Corbyn's leadership. Incidents involving Naz Shah in 2014 and Ken Livingstone in 2016 resulted in their suspension from party membership pending investigation. In response, Corbyn established the Chakrabarti Inquiry, which concluded that while the party was not "overrun by anti-Semitism or other forms of racism," there was an "occasionally toxic atmosphere" and "clear evidence of ignorant attitudes."

In 2017, Labour Party rules were amended to categorize hate speech, including antisemitism, as a disciplinary matter. In 2018, Corbyn faced scrutiny for his response in 2012 to the allegedly antisemitic mural Freedom for Humanity and for his association with Facebook groups, mainly pro-Palestinian, containing antisemitic posts. Labour's National Executive Committee (NEC) adopted a definition of antisemitism, for disciplinary purposes, in July of that year, aligning with the International Holocaust Remembrance Alliance (IHRA) Working Definition, with modified examples related to criticism of Israel.

In September 2018, the NEC incorporated all 11 IHRA examples, unamended, into the party's code of conduct.

In May 2019, the Equality and Human Rights Commission (EHRC) launched an inquiry into whether Labour had "unlawfully discriminated against, harassed or victimised people because they are Jewish". In October 2020, the EHRC published its report, determining that the party was "responsible for unlawful acts of harassment and discrimination." The EHRC found 23 instances of political interference and concluded that Labour breached the Equality Act in two cases. Corbyn was subsequently suspended from the Labour Party and had the party whip removed on 29 October 2020 "for a failure to retract" his assertion that the scale of antisemitism within Labour had been overstated by opponents.

== Media coverage ==
Analyses of domestic media coverage of Corbyn have found it to be critical or antagonistic. In July 2016, academics from the London School of Economics published a study of 812 articles about Corbyn taken from eight national newspapers around the time of his Labour leadership election. The study found that 75 per cent of the articles either distorted or failed to represent his actual views on subjects. The study's director commented that "Our analysis shows that Corbyn was thoroughly delegitimised as a political actor from the moment he became a prominent candidate and even more so after he was elected as party leader".

Another report by the Media Reform Coalition and Birkbeck College in July 2016, based on 10 days of coverage around the time of multiple shadow cabinet resignations, found "marked and persistent imbalance" in favour of sources critical to him; the International Business Times was the only outlet that gave him more favourable than critical coverage.

In August 2016, a YouGov survey found that 97% of Corbyn supporters agreed that the "mainstream media as a whole has been deliberately biasing coverage to portray Jeremy Corbyn in a negative manner", as did 51% of the general "Labour selectorate" sample.

In May 2017, Loughborough University's Centre for Research in Communication and Culture concluded that the media was attacking Corbyn far more than May during nine election campaign weekdays examined. The Daily Mail and Daily Express praised Theresa May for election pledges that were condemned when proposed by Labour in previous elections.

In February 2018, Momentum reported that attacks on Corbyn in the press were associated with increases in their membership applications. In September 2019, Labour leaders argued that traditional mainstream media outlets showed bias.

In December 2019, a study by Loughborough University found that British press coverage was twice as hostile to Labour and half as critical of the Conservatives during the 2019 general election campaign as it had been during the 2017 campaign.

In an interview with Middle East Eye in June 2020, Corbyn described the media's treatment of himself while he was Labour leader as obsessive and "at one level laughable, but all designed to be undermining". He said that the media coverage had diverted his media team from helping him pursue "a political agenda on homelessness, on poverty in Britain, on housing, on international issues" to "rebutting these crazy stories, abusive stories, about me the whole time". He said he considered suing as a result of media treatment but was guided by advice from Tony Benn, who told him, "Libel is a rich man's game, and you're not a rich man [...] Go to a libel case – even if you win the case, you'll be destroyed financially in doing so".

== Personal life ==
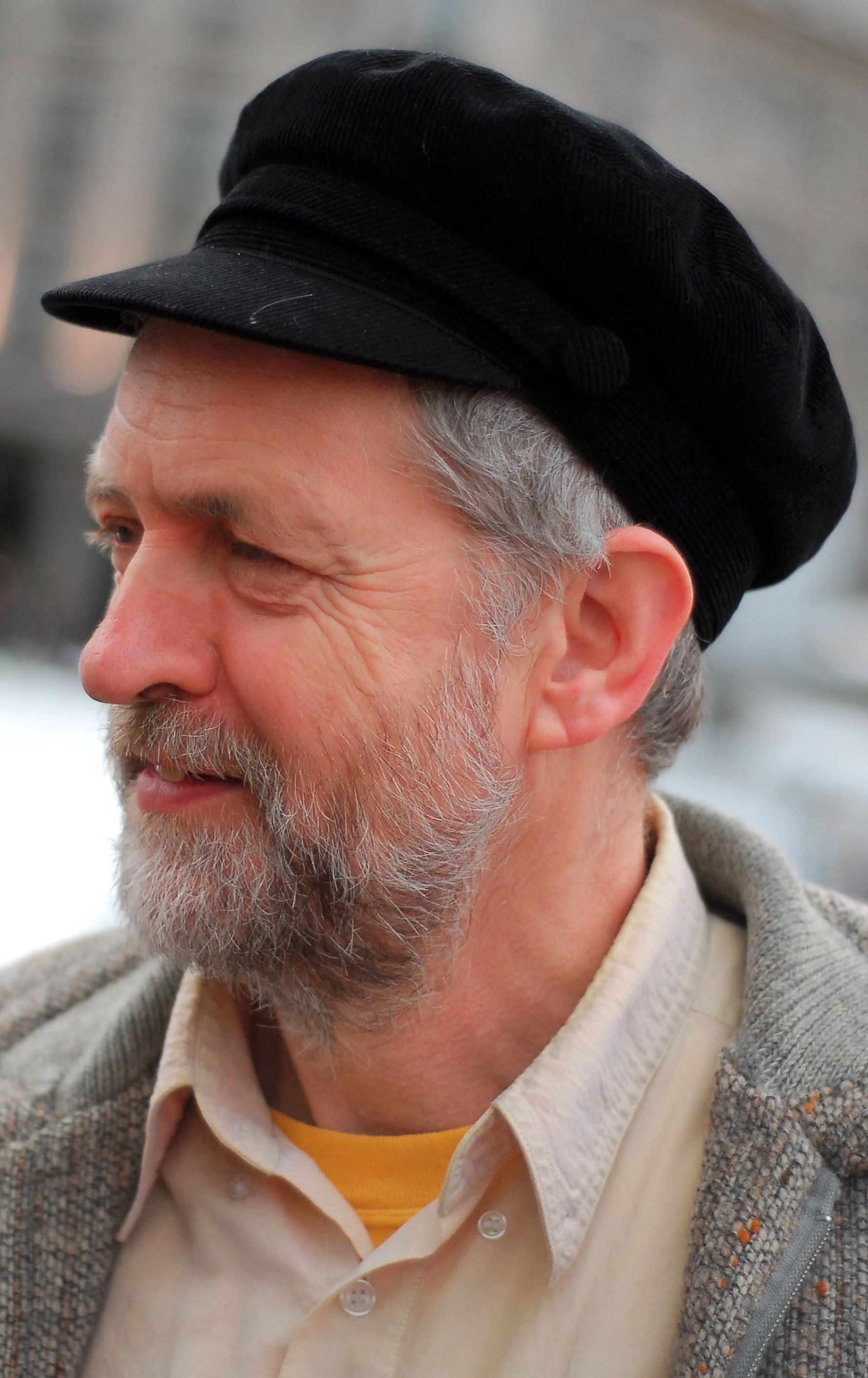
Corbyn in 2007

Corbyn lives in the Finsbury Park area of London. He has been married three times and divorced twice, and has three sons with his second wife. In 1974, he married his first wife, Jane Chapman, a fellow Labour Councillor for Haringey and now a professor at the University of Lincoln. They divorced in 1979. In the late 1970s, Corbyn had a brief relationship with Labour MP Diane Abbott.

In 1987, Corbyn married Chilean exile Claudia Bracchitta, granddaughter of Ricardo Bracchitta (Consul-General of Spain in Santiago), with whom he has three sons. He missed his youngest son's birth as he was lecturing National Union of Public Employees members at the same hospital. Following a difference of opinion about sending their son to a grammar school (Corbyn opposes selective education), they divorced in 1999 after two years of separation, although Corbyn said in June 2015 that he continues to "get on very well" with her. His son subsequently attended Queen Elizabeth's School, which had been his wife's first choice. Their second son, Sebastian, worked on his leadership campaign and was later employed as John McDonnell's Chief of Staff.

Corbyn's second-eldest brother, Andrew, who was a geologist, died of a brain haemorrhage while in Papua New Guinea in 2001. Corbyn escorted the body from Papua New Guinea to Australia, where his brother's widow and children lived.

In 2012, Corbyn went to Mexico to marry his Mexican partner Laura Álvarez, who runs a fair trade coffee import business that has been the subject of some controversy. A former human rights lawyer in Mexico, she first met Corbyn shortly after his divorce from Bracchitta, having come to London to support her sister Marcela following the abduction of her niece to America by her sister's estranged husband. They contacted fellow Labour MP Tony Benn for assistance, who introduced them to Corbyn, who met with the police on their behalf and spoke at fundraisers until the girl was located in 2003. Álvarez then returned to Mexico, with the couple maintaining a long-distance relationship until she moved to London in 2011. Álvarez has described Corbyn as "not very good at house work but he is a good politician". They had a cat called El Gato ("The Cat" in Spanish). Corbyn had previously owned a dog called Mango, described by The Observer in 1984 as his "only constant companion" at the time.

=== Personal beliefs and interests ===
When interviewed by The Huffington Post in December 2015, Corbyn refused to reveal his religious beliefs and called them a "private thing", but denied that he was an atheist. He has said that he is "sceptical" of having a god in his life. He compared his concerns about the environment to a sort of "spiritualism". Corbyn has described himself as frugal, telling Simon Hattenstone of The Guardian: "I don't spend a lot of money, I lead a very normal life, I ride a bicycle and I don't have a car." He has been a vegetarian for more than 50 years, after having volunteered on a pig farm in Jamaica when he was 19, and he stated in April 2018 that he was considering becoming a vegan. Although he has been described in the media as teetotal, he said in an interview with the Daily Mirror that he does drink alcohol but "very, very little".

Corbyn is a member of the All-Party Parliamentary Group on Cycling. He enjoys reading and writing, and speaks fluent Spanish. He supports Arsenal F.C., which is based in his constituency, and has signed parliamentary motions praising the successes of its men's and women's teams. In 2015 Corbyn supported a campaign for the club to pay its staff the London Living Wage. Corbyn is an avid "drain spotter" and has photographed decorative drain and manhole covers throughout the country.

Corbyn co-edited with Len McCluskey the anthology Poetry for the Many, published in November 2023 by OR Books.

=== Interview under police caution ===
On 19 January 2025, Corbyn, alongside former Shadow Chancellor of the Exchequer John McDonnell, agreed to be interviewed under caution by police following a pro-Palestinian rally in central London. The Metropolitan Police said they witnessed a "deliberate effort, including by protest organisers" to breach conditions that had been imposed on the event. However, the specific reasons why Corbyn was invited to an interview are unclear.

== Awards and recognition ==
In 2013, Corbyn was awarded the Gandhi International Peace Award for his "consistent efforts over a 30-year parliamentary career to uphold the Gandhian values of social justice and non‐violence". In the same year, he was honoured by the Grassroot Diplomat Initiative for his "ongoing support for a number of non-government organisations and civil causes". Corbyn has won the Parliamentary "Beard of the Year Award" a record six times, as well as being named as the Beard Liberation Front's Beard of the Year, having previously described his beard as "a form of dissent" against New Labour.

In 2016, Corbyn was the subject of a musical entitled Corbyn the Musical: The Motorcycle Diaries, written by journalists Rupert Myers and Bobby Friedman.

In 2017 the American magazine Foreign Policy named Corbyn in its Top 100 Global Thinkers list for that year "for inspiring a new generation to re-engage in politics". In December 2017 he was one of three recipients awarded the Seán MacBride Peace Prize "for his sustained and powerful political work for disarmament and peace". The award was announced the previous September.

== See also ==
- Electoral history of Jeremy Corbyn
- List of peace activists
- Jeremy (snail)

== Notes ==
Parliament of the United Kingdom
Preceded by Michael O'Halloran	Member of Parliament for Islington North; 1983–present	Incumbent
Party political offices
Preceded by Ed Miliband	Leader of the Labour Party; 2015–2020	Succeeded by Sir Keir Starmer
Political offices
Preceded by Harriet Harman	Leader of the Opposition; 2015–2020	Succeeded by Sir Keir Starmer
Non-profit organisation positions
Preceded by Andrew Murray	Chair of the Stop the War Coalition; 2011–2015	Succeeded by Andrew Murray
Awards and achievements
Preceded by Saint John Eye Hospital Group	Laureate of the Gandhi International Peace Award; 2013	Succeeded by Scott Bader Commonwealth
Preceded by Adam Driver	British GQ Cover of the Month; 2018	Succeeded by Michael B. Jordan
Orders of precedence in the United Kingdom
Preceded by Sir Steve Webb as Privy Counsellor	Gentlemen; Privy Counsellor	Succeeded by Sir David Evennett as Privy Counsellor
