= Electoral history of Jeremy Corbyn =

Elections featuring British politician

This is a summary of the electoral history of Jeremy Corbyn, Leader of the Opposition and Leader of the Labour Party of the United Kingdom from 2015 to 2020 and Member of Parliament for Islington North since 1983.

== Council elections ==
=== 1974 Haringey Borough Council election ===
Haringey Borough Council Election 1974: South Hornsey
Party	Candidate	Votes	%	±%
Labour	Jeremy Corbyn	1,190		
Labour	D.H. Billingsley	1,169		
Labour	F. Neuner	1,041		
Conservative	B.C. Greaves	879		
Conservative	P.R. Haselwood	838		
Conservative	C. Kavallares	824		
Liberal	D.A. Arnold	198		
Communist	J.A. Luckett	116		

=== 1978 Haringey Borough Council election ===
Haringey Borough Council Election 1978: Harringay
Party	Candidate	Votes	%	±%
Labour	Charles L. Silverstone	1,776		
Labour	Jeremy Corbyn	1,729		
Labour	Ronald H. Blanchard	1,651		
Conservative	Timothy W.A. Easton	1,064		
Conservative	Gerald J.Y. Murphy	1,056		
Conservative	Christakis Kavallares	1,048		
Communist	Francis W. Carr	231		
National Front	Leslie Butler	112		
National Front	John H. Green	86		
National Front	Barbara A. Green	78		

=== 1982 Haringey Borough Council election ===
Haringey Borough Council Election 1982: Harringay
Party	Candidate	Votes	%	±%
Labour	Jeremy Corbyn	1,839		
Labour	Ronald H. Blanchard	1,731		
Labour	Christakis Zissimos	1,724		
Conservative	Christakis Kavallares	673		
Conservative	Sally M. Lumb	664		
Conservative	Edward C. Webb	659		
Alliance	Robert J.F. Burns	498		
Alliance	Nigel R. Gilbert	453		
Alliance	Paul D. Moynagh	420		
Communist	Francis W. Carr	190		

== Parliamentary elections ==
=== 1983 general election, Islington North ===
General election 1983: Islington North
Party	Candidate	Votes	%	±%
Labour	Jeremy Corbyn	14,951	40.4	−12.2
Conservative	David A. Coleman	9,344	25.3	−8.3
SDP	John Grant	8,268	22.4	+13.5
Independent Labour	Michael O'Halloran	4,091	11.1	N/A
BNP	L. A. D. Bearsford-Walker	176	0.5	N/A
Independent	Roy A. J. Lincoln	134	0.4	N/A
Majority		5,607	24.7	
Turnout		36,964	66.5	
Labour hold		Swing		

=== 1987 general election, Islington North ===
General election 1987: Islington North
Party	Candidate	Votes	%	±%
Labour	Jeremy Corbyn	19,577	50.0	+9.6
Conservative	Ernest George Noad	9,920	25.3	0.0
SDP	Alan Whelan	8,560	21.8	−0.6
Green	Christopher Michael Ashby	1,131	2.9	N/A
Majority		9,657	24.7	
Turnout		38,488	66.5	
Labour hold		Swing		

=== 1992 general election, Islington North ===
General election 1992: Islington North
Party	Candidate	Votes	%	±%
Labour	Jeremy Corbyn	21,742	57.4	+7.4
Conservative	Lurline Champagnie	8,958	23.7	−1.6
Liberal Democrats	Sarah Ludford	5,732	15.1	−6.7
Green	Christopher Michael Ashby	1,420	3.8	+0.9
Majority		12,784	33.7	
Turnout		37,852	66.6	
Labour hold		Swing		

=== 1997 general election, Islington North ===
General election 1997: Islington North
Party	Candidate	Votes	%	±%
Labour	Jeremy Corbyn	24,834	69.3	+11.9
Liberal Democrats	James Kempton	4,879	13.6	−1.5
Conservative	Simon Fawthrop	4,631	12.9	−10.8
Green	Christopher Michael Ashby	1,516	4.2	+0.4
Majority		19,955	55.6	
Turnout		35,860	62.5	
Labour hold		Swing		

=== 2001 general election, Islington North ===
General election 2001: Islington North
Party	Candidate	Votes	%	±%
Labour	Jeremy Corbyn	18,699	61.9	−7.4
Liberal Democrats	Laura Willoughby	5,741	19.0	+5.4
Conservative	Neil Rands	3,249	10.8	−2.2
Green	Christopher Michael Ashby	1,876	6.2	+2.0
Socialist Labour	Stephen Cook	512	1.7	N/A
Reform 2000 Party	Emine Hassan	139	0.5	N/A
Majority		12,958	42.9	
Turnout		30,216	48.8	−13.7
Labour hold		Swing		

=== 2005 general election, Islington North ===
General election 2005: Islington North
Party	Candidate	Votes	%	±%
Labour	Jeremy Corbyn	16,118	51.2	−10.7
Liberal Democrats	Laura Willoughby	9,402	29.9	+10.9
Conservative	Nicola Talbot	3,740	11.9	+1.1
Green	Jon Nott	2,234	7.1	+0.9
Majority		6,716	21.3	
Turnout		31,494	53.9	+5.1
Labour hold		Swing	−10.8	

=== 2010 general election, Islington North ===
General election 2010: Islington North
Party	Candidate	Votes	%	±%
Labour	Jeremy Corbyn	24,276	54.5	+3.3
Liberal Democrats	Rhodri Jamieson-Ball	11,875	26.7	−3.2
Conservative	Adrian Berrill-Cox	6,339	14.2	+2.4
Green	Emma Dixon	1,348	3.0	−4.1
UKIP	Dominic Lennon	716	1.6	N/A
Majority		12,401	27.8	
Turnout		44,554	65.4	+11.5
Labour hold		Swing	+3.3	

=== 2015 general election, Islington North ===
General election 2015: Islington North
Party	Candidate	Votes	%	±%
Labour	Jeremy Corbyn	29,659	60.2	+5.8
Conservative	Dr Alex Burghart	8,465	17.2	+3.0
Green	Caroline Russell	5,043	10.2	+7.2
Liberal Democrats	Julian Gregory	3,984	8.1	−18.6
UKIP	Greg Clough	1,971	4.0	+2.4
Socialist (GB)	Bill Martin	112	0.2	+0.2
Majority		21,194	43.0	+15.2
Turnout		49,234	67.1	+1.7
Labour hold		Swing	+1.4	

=== 2017 general election, Islington North ===
General election 2017: Islington North
Party	Candidate	Votes	%	±%
Labour	Jeremy Corbyn	40,086	73.0	+12.7
Conservative	James Clark	6,871	12.5	−4.7
Liberal Democrats	Keith Angus	4,946	9.0	+0.9
Green	Caroline Russell	2,229	4.1	−6.2
UKIP	Keith Fraser	413	0.8	−3.3
No label	Michael Foster	208	0.4	N/A
Monster Raving Loony	Knigel Knapp	106	0.2	N/A
Independent	Susanne Cameron-Blackie	41	0.1	N/A
Socialist (GB)	Bill Martin	21	0.0	−0.2
Communist League	Andres Mendoza	7	0.0	N/A
Majority		33,215	60.5	+17.5
Turnout		54,515	73.3	+6.2
Labour hold		Swing	+11.7	

=== 2019 general election, Islington North ===
General election 2019: Islington North
Party	Candidate	Votes	%	±%
Labour	Jeremy Corbyn	34,603	64.3	−8.7
Liberal Democrats	Nick Wakeling	8,415	15.6	+6.6
Conservative	James Clark	5,483	10.2	−2.3
Green	Caroline Russell	4,326	8.0	+3.9
Brexit Party	Yosef David	742	1.4	N/A
Monster Raving Loony	Nick The Incredible Flying Brick	236	0.4	+0.2
Majority		26,188	48.7	−11.8
Turnout		53,805	71.6	−1.8
Registered electors		75,162		
Labour hold		Swing		

=== 2024 general election, Islington North ===
General election 2024: Islington North
Party	Candidate	Votes	%	±%
Independent	Jeremy Corbyn	24,120	49.2	N/A
Labour	Praful Nargund	16,873	34.4	−29.9
Green	Sheridan Kates	2,660	5.4	−2.6
Conservative	Karen Harries	1,950	4.0	−6.2
Reform	Martyn Nelson	1,710	3.5	+2.1
Liberal Democrats	Vikas Aggarwal	1,661	3.4	−12.2
Independent	Paul Josling	32	0.1	+0.1
Majority		7,247	14.8	N/A
Turnout		49,006	67.5	−4.1
Registered electors		72,582		
Independent gain from Labour		Swing		

== 2015 Labour Party leadership election ==
Following the resignation of Ed Miliband as Labour Party leader on 8 May 2015, Jeremy Corbyn announced his candidacy for the position on 3 June 2015. The new leader would be decided by a ballot of party members, supporters and affiliates, where the candidate securing over 50% would be elected.

=== First preference votes, result announced 12 September 2015 ===
Candidate	Party members		Registered supporters		Affiliated supporters		Total	
Candidate	Votes	%	Votes	%	Votes	%	Votes	%
Jeremy Corbyn	121,751	49.59%	88,449	83.76%	41,217	57.61%	251,417	59.5%
Andy Burnham	55,698	22.69%	6,160	5.83%	18,604	26.00%	80,462	19.0%
Yvette Cooper	54,470	22.18%	8,415	7.97%	9,043	12.64%	71,928	17.0%
Liz Kendall	13,601	5.54%	2,574	2.44%	2,682	3.75%	18,857	4.5%

== 2016 Labour Party leadership election ==
The British Labour Party leadership election of 2016 was called when a challenge to Jeremy Corbyn as Leader of the Labour Party arose following criticism of his allegedly weak support for the Remain campaign in the referendum on membership of the European Union and questions about his leadership of the party.

=== First preference votes, result announced 24 September 2016 ===
Candidate	Party members		Registered supporters		Affiliated supporters		Total	
Candidate	Votes	%	Votes	%	Votes	%	Votes	%
Jeremy Corbyn	168,216	59.0%	84,918	69.9%	60,075	60.2%	313,209	61.8%
Owen Smith	116,960	41.0%	36,599	30.1%	39,670	39.8%	193,229	38.2%

== 2017 United Kingdom general election ==
Results of the June 2017 House of Commons of the United Kingdom results
Political party	Leader	MPs						Votes		
Political party	Leader	Candidates	Total	Gained	Lost	Net	Of total (%)	Total	Of total (%)	Change (%)
Conservative	Theresa May	638	317	20	33	−13	48.8	13,636,684	42.3	+5.5
Labour	Jeremy Corbyn	631 (Note: Includes 52 Co-operative Party candidates, as part of the Labour-Co-op alliance)	262 (Note: Includes 38 Co-operative Party MPs, as part of the Labour-Co-op alliance)	36 (Note: Includes 14 Co-operative Party MPs, as part of the Labour-Co-op alliance)	6	+30 (Note: Includes +14 Co-operative Party MPs, as part of the Labour-Co-op alliance)	40.3 (Note: Includes 5.8% for the Co-operative Party, as part of the Labour-Co-op alliance)	12,877,918 (Note: Includes 1,350,007 for the Co-operative Party, as part of the Labour-Co-op alliance)	40.0 (Note: Includes 4.2% for the Co-operative Party, as part of the Labour-Co-op alliance)	+9.6 (Note: Includes +1.4% for the Co-operative Party, as part of the Labour-Co-op alliance)
Liberal Democrats	Tim Farron	629	12	8	4	+4	1.8	2,371,861	7.4	−0.5
SNP	Nicola Sturgeon	59	35	0	21	−21	5.4	977,568	3.0	−1.7
UKIP	Paul Nuttall	378	0	0	1	−1	0	594,068	1.8	−10.8
Green Party of England and Wales	Caroline Lucas and Jonathan Bartley	457	1	0	0	0	0.2	512,327	1.6	−2.0
DUP	Arlene Foster	17	10	2	0	+2	1.5	292,316	0.9	+0.3
Sinn Féin	Gerry Adams	18	7	3	0	+3	1.1	238,915	0.7	+0.1
Plaid Cymru	Leanne Wood	40	4	1	0	+1	0.6	164,466	0.5	−0.1
Independent		187	1	0	0	0	0.2	151,471	0.5	+0.2
SDLP	Colum Eastwood	18	0	0	3	−3	0	95,419	0.3	0.0
UUP	Robin Swann	14	0	0	2	−2	0	83,280	0.3	−0.1
Alliance	Naomi Long	18	0	0	0	0	0	64,553	0.2	0.0
Speaker	John Bercow	1	1	0	0	0	0.2	34,299	0.1	0.0
Yorkshire	Stewart Arnold	21	0	0	0	0	0	20,958	0.1	+0.1
NHA	Alex Ashman	5	0	0	0	0	0	16,119	0.1	−0.1
Green Party Northern Ireland	Steven Agnew	7	0	0	0	0	0	7,452	0.0	0.0
Scottish Green Party	Patrick Harvie and Maggie Chapman	3	0	0	0	0	0	5,886	0.0	−0.1
CPA	Sidney Cordle	31	0	0	0	0	0	5,869	0.0	0.0
People Before Profit	Eamonn McCann	2	0	0	0	0	0	5,509	0.0	0.0
Ashfield Independents		1	0	0	0	0	0	4,612	0.0	0.0
BNP	Adam Walker	10	0	0	0	0	0	4,580	0.0	0.0
Monster Raving Loony	Alan Hope	12	0	0	0	0	0	3,890	0.0	0.0
Liberal	Steve Radford	4	0	0	0	0	0	3,672	0.0	0.0
Women's Equality	Sophie Walker	7	0	0	0	0	0	3,580	0.0	0.0
TUV	Jim Allister	1	0	0	0	0	0	3,282	0.0	−0.1
North East Party	Mary Cartwright	1	0	0	0	0	0	2,355	0.0	0.0
Pirate	David A Elston	10	0	0	0	0	0	2,321	0.0	0.0
English Democrat	Robin Tilbrook	7	0	0	0	0	0	1,913	0.0	0.0
Christian	Jeff Green	2	0	0	0	0	0	1,720	0.0	0.0
Independent Save Withybush Save Lives		1	0	0	0	0	0	1,209	0.0	0.0
Socialist Labour	Arthur Scargill	3	0	0	0	0	0	1,154	0.0	0.0
Animal Welfare	Vanessa Hudson	4	0	0	0	0	0	955	0.0	0.0
JAC		2	0	0	0	0	0	842	0.0	0.0
Southampton Independents		1	0	0	0	0	0	816	0.0	0.0
Workers Revolutionary	Sheila Torrance	5	0	0	0	0	0	771	0.0	0.0
Workers' Party		2	0	0	0	0	0	708	0.0	0.0
Something New		2	0	0	0	0	0	552	0.0	0.0
Demos Direct Initiative Party		1	0	0	0	0	0	551	0.0	0.0
Libertarian	Adam Brown	4	0	0	0	0	0	524	0.0	0.0
SDP	Peter Johnson	6	0	0	0	0	0	469	0.0	0.0
Peace	John Morris	2	0	0	0	0	0	468	0.0	0.0
Friends Party		3	0	0	0	0	0	435	0.0	0.0
Better for Bradford		1	0	0	0	0	0	420	0.0	0.0
All other parties		38	0	0	0	0	0	5,447	0.0	0.0
Total		3,304	650					32,204,184		

== 2019 United Kingdom general election ==
Results of the December 2019 general election to the House of Commons of the United Kingdom
Political party	Leader	Candidates	MPs					Votes		
Political party	Leader	Candidates	Total	Gained	Lost	Net	Of total (%)	Total	Of total (%)	Change (%)
Conservative	Boris Johnson	635	365	58	10	▲48	56.2	13,966,454	43.63	+1.2
Labour	Jeremy Corbyn	631 (Note: Includes 50 Co-operative Party candidates, as part of the Labour-Co-op alliance)	202 (Note: Includes 26 Co-operative Party MPs, as part of the Labour-Co-op alliance)	1	61 (Note: Includes 12 Co-operative Party MPs, as part of the Labour-Co-op alliance)	▼60 (Note: Includes -12 Co-operative Party MPs, as part of the Labour-Co-op alliance)	31.1 (Note: Includes 4.0% for the Co-operative Party, as part of the Labour-Co-op alliance)	10,269,051 (Note: Includes 1,025,882 for the Co-operative Party, as part of the Labour-Co-op alliance)	32.08 (Note: Includes 3.2% for the Co-operative Party, as part of the Labour-Co-op alliance)	−7.9 (Note: Includes -1.0% for the Co-operative Party, as part of the Labour-Co-op alliance)
Liberal Democrats	Jo Swinson	611	11	3	4	▼1	1.7	3,696,419	11.55	+4.2
Scottish National Party	Nicola Sturgeon	59	48	14	1	▲13	7.4	1,242,380	3.88	+0.8
Green Party of England and Wales	Siân Berry and Jonathan Bartley	472	1	0	0	0	0.2	835,597	2.61	+1.1
Brexit Party	Nigel Farage	275						644,257	2.01	
DUP	Arlene Foster	17	8	0	2	▼2	1.2	244,128	0.76	−0.1
Sinn Féin	Mary Lou McDonald	15	7	1	1	0	1.1	181,853	0.57	−0.2
Plaid Cymru	Adam Price	36	4	0	0	0	0.6	153,265	0.48	0.0
Alliance	Naomi Long	18	1	1	0	▲1	0.2	134,115	0.42	+0.2
SDLP	Colum Eastwood	15	2	2	0	▲2	0.3	118,737	0.37	+0.1
UUP	Steve Aiken	16						93,123	0.29	0.0
Yorkshire	Christopher Whitwood	28						29,201	0.09	0.0
Scottish Greens	Patrick Harvie & Lorna Slater	22						28,122	0.09	
Speaker	Lindsay Hoyle	1	1	1	1	0	0.2	26,831	0.08	0.0
UKIP	Patricia Mountain (interim)	44						22,817	0.07	−1.8
Ashfield Ind.	Jason Zadrozny	1						13,498	0.04	0.0
Liberal	Steve Radford	19						10,876	0.03	0.0
The Independent Group for Change	Anna Soubry	3						10,006	0.03	
Aontú	Peadar Tóibín	7						9,814	0.03	
Monster Raving Loony	Howling Laud Hope	24						9,739	0.03	0.0
People Before Profit	Collective	2						7,526	0.02	
Birkenhead Social Justice	Frank Field	1						7,285	0.02	
CPA	Sidney Cordle	29						6,486	0.02	0.0
Heavy Woollen Independents	Aleksandar Lukic	1						6,432	0.02	
SDP	William Clouston	20						3,295	0.01	0.0
Animal Welfare	Vanessa Hudson	6						3,086	0.01	0.0
North East	Mark Burdon	2						2,637	0.01	
Lincolnshire Independent	Marianne Overton	1						1,999	0.01	
Green Party Northern Ireland	Clare Bailey	3						1,996	0.01	
English Democrat	Robin Tilbrook	5						1,987	0.01	0.0
Libertarian	Adam Brown	6						1,780	0.01	0.0
Mebyon Kernow	Dick Cole	1						1,660	0.01	0.0
Proud of Oldham and Saddleworth	Paul Errock	2						1,606	0.01	
Independent Network	Ian Stephens	1						1,542	0.0	
Gwlad	Gwyn Wigley Evans	3						1,515	0.00	
Cynon Valley	Andrew Chainey	1						1,322	0.00	
VPP	Robin Horsfall	2						1,219	0.00	
Burnley and Padiham Party	Mark Payne	1						1,162	0.00	
Shropshire Party	Robert Jones	1						1,141	0.00	
Putting Cumbria First	Jonathan Davies	1						1,070	0.00	
Peace	John Morris	2						960	0.00	
Wycombe Independents	Matt Knight	1						926	0.00	
JAC	Donald Jerrard	3						728	0.00	
Christian	Jeff Green	2						705	0.00	0.0
Renew	Julie Girling	4						545	0.00	0.0
Workers Revolutionary	Joshua Ogunleye	5						524	0.00	0.0
BNP	Adam Walker	1						510	0.00	0.0
Parties with fewer than 500 votes each		40						5,697	0.02	
Independent (non-party) candidates		224			1	▼1		206,486	0.64	
Blank and invalid votes								117,919	—	—
Total		3320	650			0	100	32,014,110	100	0.0
Registered voters, and turnout								47,587,254	67.52	−1.3
