= Jane Chapman =

British academic

Jane Louise Chapman
- Born: May 1950 (age 76); Weston Super Mare
- Education: University College London; London School of Economics; University of Cambridge
- Occupation: Academic
- Title: Professor of communications, University of Lincoln
- Spouses: Jeremy Corbyn (m. 1974; div. 1979) Martin Clarke (m. 1982)
- Children: 2

Jane Chapman (born May 1950) is a British academic, professor of communications at the University of Lincoln, a research associate and a former fellow at Wolfson College, Cambridge and the Centre of South Asian Studies, Cambridge. She is the author of twelve books and over 35 academic articles and book chapters.

== Early life ==
Her mother was a Conservative supporter. She attended Sexey's Grammar School in Blackford, Somerset, as a boarder,, now Hugh Sexey Church of England Middle School, gaining eleven O-levels in 1966, and A-levels in 1968, Latin, and grade A in French and History.

Chapman has a bachelor's degree in history from University College London, a postgraduate certificate in education from Cambridge University, and a PhD from the London School of Economics.

== Career ==
=== Academic ===
She taught French in 1975, at Clissold Park Comprehensive School, now Stoke Newington School, when she lived in Tottenham.

She worked as a lecturer at a higher education college in the 1980s.

Since 2005 at the University of Lincoln, Chapman has gained and managed eight research grants in journalism and cultural heritage, for the British Academy, ESRC, and AHRC. She is acknowledged academically as an international pioneer in comparative method, due to her book 'Comparative Media History'.

=== Media ===
As the author of over 200 television films and videos, 12 academic books and over 40 articles and book chapters, Chapman's career combines equal amounts of experience in both university research and the media industry.

She was Breakfast TV's first on-screen reporter for the north of England, and ran her own independent production companies Chapman Clarke Television, Chapman Clarke films and Chapman Clarke Multi Media for 14 years, producing documentary and educational films and series for the UK's broadcasters, such as 'Women- the Way Ahead' (Open College for C4), 'Europe by Design' (BBC Education for BBC1) and 'Cider People' (HTV West).

In 1987 she produced the series 'Women Working it Out', with a book. It had a five part series on Channel 4 from September 21 1987. Another television series was 'Women - the Way Ahead' in 1989.

She has won awards ranging from the New York Film and TV Festival through best media history book of the year by American Universities, to best academic article of the year by Emerald Publishing, and sharing the 2017 Colby Prize for Victorian Literature (for the Routledge Handbook of 19th British Periodicals and Newspapers).

Chapman and her team worked with community groups both nationally and locally to enable research and commemoration of the centenary of the First World War, re-discovering hundreds of original cartoons in soldier newspapers produced from the trenches. She was an academic advisor for the BBC’s World War One at Home.

=== Politics ===
Chapman was a Haringey Borough Councillor, alongside future Labour Party leader Jeremy Corbyn, and became chairman of the housing committee.

She stood as a Labour candidate in United Kingdom general elections in the late 1970s: Dorking and Dover and Deal. She was selected for Dover in November 1975.

== Personal life ==
She married on May 4 1974 at the local town hall. Chapman divorced from future Labour Party leader Jeremy Corbyn in mid-December 1979.

Chapman has two adult sons. In 1982 she married the film editor/director, Martin Clarke, in north London. She moved to Pilton, Somerset in September 1998.

== Selected publications ==
=== Books ===
- 2019, Chapman, Jane: Early Black Media, 1918-1924, Palgrave Macmillan. Basingstoke, UK.
- 2018, Chapman, Jane: Afro Caribbean Voices from 1919, Palgrave Macmillan, Basingstoke, UK.
- 2015: Comics and the World Wars – a Cultural Record (a monograph), Palgrave Macmillan, Basingstoke, UK
- 2015: Chapman, Jane L., Ellin, D and Sherif, A. Comics, Hiroshima and the Holocaust (a mini-monograph), Palgrave Macmillan, Basingstoke, UK
- Chapman, Jane (2013) Gender, citizenship and newspapers: historical and transnational perspectives. Palgrave Macmillan, Basingstoke, UK. ISBN 9780230232440 Nominated for US Best Book of Year, AJHA/AEJMC.
- King, Elliot and Chapman, Jane L. (2012) Key readings in journalism. Routledge, New York London. ISBN 9780415880275
- Chapman, Jane and Nuttall, Nick (2011) Journalism today: a themed history. Wiley-Blackwell, Malden, MA. ISBN 9781405179539
- Chapman, Jane (2009) Issues in contemporary documentary. Polity Press, Cambridge, UK. ISBN 9780745640105
- Chapman, Jane and Kinsey, Marie (2008) Broadcast journalism: a critical introduction. Routledge, London. ISBN 0203886453
- Chapman, Jane (2007) Documentary in practice: filmmakers and production choices. Polity, Cambridge. ISBN 0745636128
- Chapman, Jane (2005) Comparative media history, an introduction: 1789 to the present. Polity, Cambridge. ISBN 0745632424 Nominated for US Best Book of the Year, AJHA / AEJMC
- Chapman, Jane (1990) Women working it out [2nd ed.]. Careers & Occupational Information Centre, Sheffield, HMSO. ISBN 0861105524
- Chapman, Jane (1988) Women working it out [1st ed.]. Careers & Occupational Information Centre, Sheffield, HMSO. ISBN 0861104668

=== Book sections ===
- Chapman, Jane (2019)'The Struggles and Economic Hardship of Women Working Class Activists, 1918-1923', in Letters to the Editor: Comparative and Historical Perspectives, Palgrave Macmillan, Basingstoke
- Chapman, Jane (2016) Transnational connections and the comparative approach. In: The Routledge Handbook to Nineteenth-Century British Periodicals and Newspapers, eds Andrew King, Alexis Easley, John Morton, ISBN 9781409468882
- Chapman, Jane (2016) The argument of the broken pane: Suffragette consumerism and newspapers. In: Redefining journalism in the era of the mass press, 1880-1920. Taylor & Francis (Routledge). ISBN 9781138658806
- Chapman, Jane and Ellin, Dan (2016) Dominion cartoon satire as trench culture narratives: complaints, endurance and stoicism. In: The British Empire and the First World War. Routledge. ISBN 9781138932197
- Chapman, Jane (2014) Comic strip representation of female wartime bravery in Australia's Wanda the War Girl and Jane at War from the UK. In: Fashion and war in popular culture. Intellect Publishing, Bristol. ISBN 9781841507514
- Chapman, Jane (2014) The essential Gandhi as literary journalism in Hind Swaraj. In: Global Literary Journalism: Exploring the Journalistic Imagination. Peter Lang.
- Chapman, Jane (2012) From India's big dams to jungle guerillas: Arundhati Roy and the literary polemics of global versus local. In: Global literary journalism: exploring the journalistic imagination. Peter Lang, New York. ISBN 9781433118678
- Chapman, Jane (2011) Female representation in Le Petit Journal, Europe's first mass circulation daily. In: Parcours de femmes: Twenty Years of Women in French. Peter Lang. ISBN 9783034302081
- Chapman, Jane (2010) De-bunking feminisation claims and Northcliffe propaganda - Le Petit Journal and The Daily Mail, 19th century popular press and women. In: Media History. Sage.
- Chapman, Jane (2010) Assessing the female influence in Europe's first mass circulation daily newspaper. In: Modern and Contemporary France. Taylor and Francis.
- Chapman, Jane (2008) Republican Citizenship and the French Revolutionary Press. In: Communications Ethics Now. Richard Keeble, Troubadour.
- Chapman, Jane (2007) The personal is the political: George Sand's contribution to popular journalism. In: The journalistic imagination: literary journalists from Defoe to Capote and Carter. Routledge, New York. ISBN 9780415417235

=== Articles ===
- Chapman, Jane and Ellin, Dan (2014) Dominion Cartoon Satire as Trench Culture Narratives: Complaints, Endurance and Stoicism. Round Table (Journal of the Royal Commonwealth Society), vol. 103.2, pp. 175–192
- Tulloch, John and Chapman, Jane (2013) An outlaw editor in the endgame of the Indian empire. Media History, 19 (1). pp. 17–31. ISSN 1368-8804
- Chapman, Jane and Ellin, Daniel (2012) Multi-panel comic narratives in Australian first world war trench publications as citizen journalism. Australian Journal of Communication, 39 (3). pp. 1–22. ISSN 0811-6202
- Chapman, Jane (2011) Female representation, readership, and early tabloid properties. Australian Journal of Communication, 38 (2). ISSN 0811-6202
- Chapman, Jane (2011) Representation of female war-time bravery in Australia's Wanda the War Girl. Australasian Journal of Popular Culture, 1 (2). pp. 153–163. ISSN 2045-5852
- Chapman, Jane and Allison, Kate (2011) Women and the press in British India, 1928-34: a window for protest?. International Journal of Social Economics, 38 (8). pp. 676–692. ISSN 0306-8293 – Winner of publisher Best Article of the Year prize.
- Chapman, Jane (2011) Counter hegemony, newspapers and the origins of anti-colonialism in French India. International Journal of Social Economics, 38 (2). pp. 128–139. ISSN 0306-8293
- Chapman, Jane (2010) The origins of a public voice for marginalised workers in French India, 1935-37. Web Journal of French Media Studies (WJFMS), 8. ISSN 1460-6550
- Chapman, Jane (2009) Hegemony and counter hegemony in communication history [Guest editorial of special issue on]. International Journal of Communication, 19 (1). pp. 5–8.
- Chapman, Jane and King, Elliot (2009) A 'dozen best' essential readings in journalism. American Journalism, 26 (3). pp. 168–183. ISSN 0882-1127
- Chapman, Jane (2009) Introduction to 'Counter Currents in Journalism History' as guest editor of special edition of International Journal of Communication, vol. 1, January–June (Bahri Publications, New Delhi)
- Chapman, Jane (2007) India's Narmada dams controversy: interdisciplinary examples of global media advocacy. The Journal of International Communication, 13 (1). pp. 71–85. ISSN 1321-6597
- Chapman, Jane (2007) George Sand: thwarted newspaper publisher or pioneer literary journalist. Modern and Contemporary France, 15 (4). pp. 479–495. ISSN 0963-9489
- Chapman, Jane (2007) Arundhati Roy and the Narmada Dams controversy : development journalism and the 'new international public sphere'?. International Journal of Communication, 17 (2). pp. 21–39.
- Chapman, Jane (2006) Reflections on 15 years of activist media and India's Narmada Dams controversy. International Journal of Communication, 16 (1-2). pp. 21–39.
- Chapman, Jane (2006) George Sand: journaliste litteraire, www.republique-des-lettres.fr
- Chapman, Jane (2006) La citoyenneté républicaine, l'éthique et la presse sous la Révolution française 1789-92, www.republique-des-lettres.fr
- Chapman, Jane (2005) Republican citizenship, ethics and the French revolutionary press 1789-92. Ethical Space: the International Journal of Communication Ethics, 2 (1). pp. 7–12. ISSN 1742-0105
